= Verulam Formation =

Geologic formation in Ontario, Canada

- Stratigraphic range: Sandbian to Katian
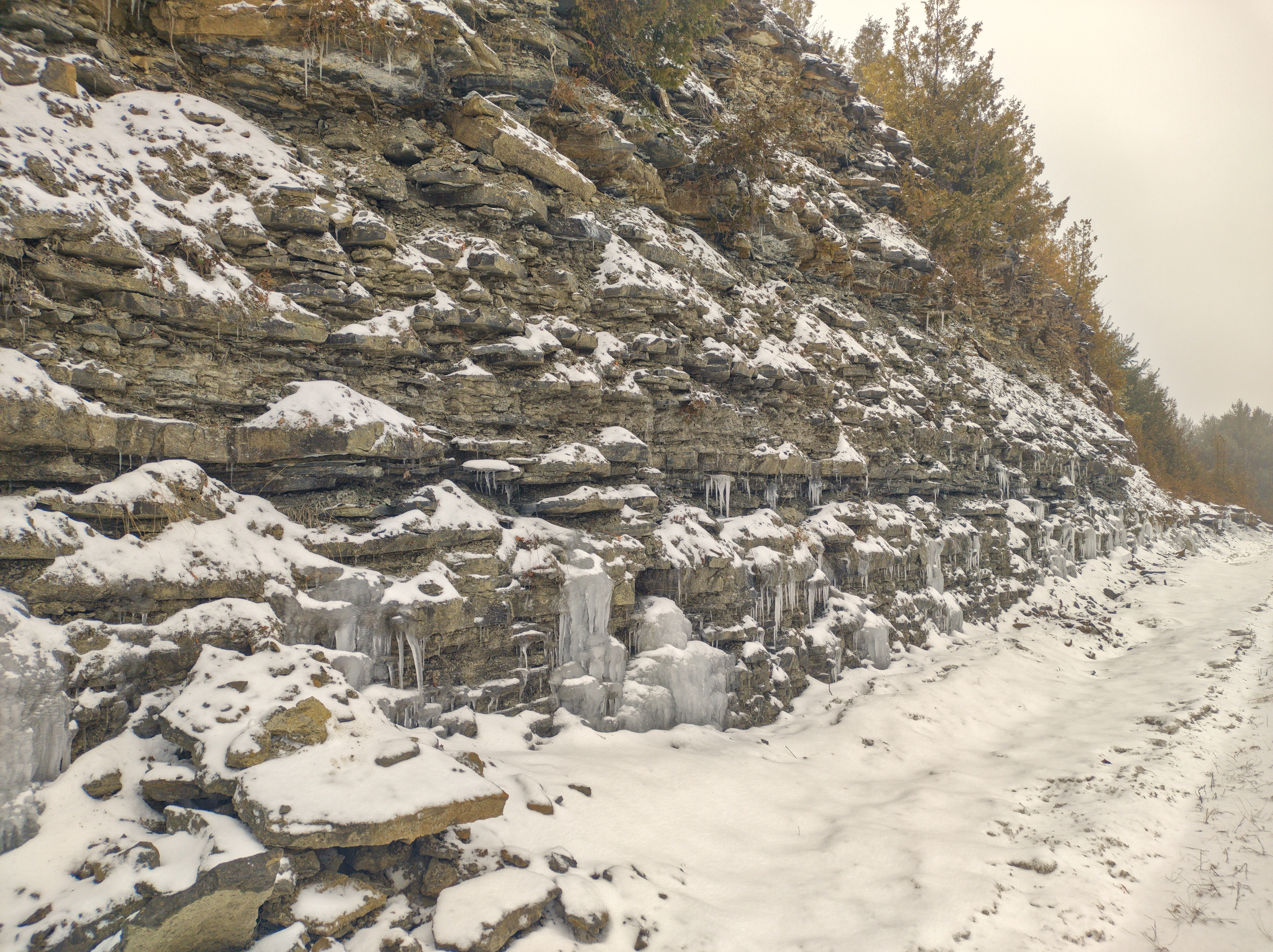
- Outcrop along Kirkfield Rd., Kawartha Lakes.
- Type: Formation
- Unit of: Simcoe Group; Trenton Group
- Sub-units: Cystid Beds
- Underlies: Lindsay Formation; Cobourg Formation
- Overlies: Bobcaygeon Formation; Kirkfield Formation

Lithology
- Primary: Limestone
- Other: Mudstone, shale, siltstone

Location
- Coordinates: 44.6°N 79.1°W
- Approximate paleocoordinates: 23.9°S 52.1°W
- Region: Ontario
- Country: Canada

Type section
- Named by: B.A Liberty
- Year defined: 1955
- Verulam Formation (Canada) Verulam Formation (Ontario)

The Verulam Formation is a geologic formation and Lagerstätte in Ontario, Canada. It preserves fossils dating back to the Katian stage of the Ordovician period, or Shermanian to Chatfieldian in the regional stratigraphy.

== Description ==
The Verulam Formation belongs to the Simcoe Group in South-central Ontario and to the Trenton Group in Southwestern Ontario. Within the Simcoe Group, it overlies the Bobcaygeon Formation. Both the Bobcaygeon and Verulam Formations are composed of bioclastic wackestones, grainstones, and packstones interbedded with calcareous shales and siltstones. The Verulam contains more shale than the underlying Bobcaygeon Formation. Several hardgrounds have been documented in detail from the upper Bobcaygeon and lower Verulam. The paleoenvironments in which the Bobcaygeon and Verulam Formations were deposited have been interpreted as a proximal carbonate shelf that ranged in depth and proximity from shoal to shallow shelf in the Bobcaygeon and from deep shelf to shoal or shallow shelf in the Verulam Formation.

== Fossil content ==
The Verulam Formation and the underlying Bobcaygeon Formation have provided many fossils. Both formations form the Brechin Lagerstätte, a Lagerstätte of excellent preservation of numerous exceptionally preserved crinoid specimens with arms, stems, and attachment structures intact. Also ostracods, trilobites, bivalves, gastropods, cephalopods and other fossils were found in the formation.

Crinoids

- Glyptocrinus ramulosus
- Isotomocrinus tenuis
- Cleiocrinus regius
- Priscillacrinus elegans
- Abludoglyptocrinus steinheimerae
- Pararchaeocrinus kiddi
- Periglyptocrinus astricus
- Periglyptocrinus kevinbretti
- Periglyptocrinus mcdonaldi
- Periglyptocrinus priscus
- Periglyptocrinus silvosus
- Cupulocrinus jewetti
- Cupulocrinus humilis
- Praecupulocrinus conjugans
- Praecupulocrinus? sp.
- Iocrinus trentonensis
- Eustenocrinus springeri
- Cremacrinus guttenbergensis
- C. inaequalis
- Daedalocrinus bellevillensis
- Anomalocrinus astrictus
- Protaxocrinus laevis
- Plicodendrocrinus proboscidiatus
- Simcoecrinus mahalaki
- Dendrocrinus simcoensis
- Grenprisia billingsi
- Grenprisia springeri
- Illemocrinus amphiatus
- Porocrinus conicus
- Carabocrinus vancortlandti
- Carabocrinus radiatus
- Hybocrinus tumidus
- Hybocystites problematicus
- Konieckicrinus brechinensis
- K. josephi
- Reteocrinus alveolatus
- R. stellaris
- Archaeocrinus maraensis
- A. sundayae

Trilobites

- Encrinurus cybeleformis
- Erratencrinurus vigilans
- Flexicalymene senaria
- Isotelus gigas
- Ceraurinus marginatus
- Ceraurus pleurexanthemus
- cf. Achatella achates
- Bathyurus (Raymondites) ingalli
- Amphilichas sp.
- Bumastoides sp.
- Calyptaulax sp.
- Ceraurus sp.
- Encrinuroides sp.
- Flexicalymene sp.
- Hemiarges sp.
- Isotelus sp.

Edrioasteroidea

- Thresherodiscus ramosus
- Cryptogoleus chapmani
- Isorophusella sp.

Ostracods

- Thomasatia sp.
- Bassleratia sp.
- Eoleperditia sp.

Strophomenata

- Sowerbyella sp.
- Rafinesquina sp.
- Oepikina sp.

Rhynchonellata

- Anazyga sp.
- Zygospira sp.
- Rhynchotrema sp.
- Resserella sp.
- Dinorthis sp.
- Hesperorthis sp.
- Platystrophia sp.
- Plectorthis sp.

Bivalves

- Cyrtodonta subangulata
- Clionychia undata
- Plaesiomys subcircularis
- Ambonychia cf. orbicularis
- Ctenodonta cf. simulatrix
- Ambonychia sp.
- Ctenodonta sp.
- Nuculites sp.
- Tancrediopsis sp.

Gastropods

- Bucania halli
- Hormotoma gracilis
- Sinuites cancellatus
- Eotomaria dryope
- Alaskadiscus disculus
- Cyrtostropha salteri canadensis
- Fusispira elongata
- F. angusta
- Pterotheca sp.
- Liospira sp.
- Lophospira sp.
- Hormotoma sp.
- Subulites sp.
- Fusispira sp.

Cephalopods

- Endoceras cf. proteiforme
- Actinoceras sp.
- Endoceras sp.

Stenolaemata

- Mesotrypa angularis
- M. quebecensis
- M. whiteavesi
- Homotrypa minnesotensis
- Prasopora grandis
- P. insularis
- P. simulatrix
- Eridotrypa aedilis
- Pachydictya sp.
- Stictoporella sp.
- Hallopora sp.
- Mesotrypa sp.
- Prasopora sp.
- Rhinidictya sp.
- Batostoma sp.
- Hallopora multitabulata

Scyphozoa

- Climacoconus sp.

Rhombifera

- Glyptocystites sp.

Chlorophyceae

- Ischadites sp.

== See also ==
- List of fossiliferous stratigraphic units in Ontario
- Arnheim Formation, contemporaneous fossiliferous formation of Ohio
- San Benito Formation, contemporaneous fossiliferous formation of Bolivia
- Late Ordovician glaciation
- Ordovician meteor event
- Taconic orogeny
