= List of fossiliferous stratigraphic units in Ontario =

This is a list of stratigraphic units in Ontario bearing fossils.

Group or formation	Period	Notes
Aberdeen Lake Formation	Ordovician	
Amherstburg Formation	Devonian	
Arkona Formation	Devonian	
Arkona Shale	Devonian	
Attawapiskat Formation	Silurian	
Bad Cache Rapids Group/Surprise Creek Formation	Ordovician	
Bertie Group/Williamsville Formation	Silurian	
Black River Group/Bobcaygeon Formation	Ordovician	
Black River Group/Ottawa Formation	Ordovician	
Bobcaygeon Formation	Ordovician	
Cabot Head Formation	Silurian	
Cobourg Formation	Ordovician	
DeCew Formation	Silurian	
Detroit River Group/Lucas Formation	Devonian	
Don Beds Formation	Canada	
Dyer Bay Formation	Silurian	
Ekwan River Formation	Silurian	
Eramosa Formation	Silurian	
Farr Formation	Ordovician	
Fossil Hill Formation	Silurian	
Gasport Formation	Silurian	
Georgian Bay Formation	Ordovician	
Goat Island Formation	Silurian	
Guelph Formation	Silurian	
Gull River Formation	Ordovician	
Hamilton Group/Hungry Hollow Formation	Devonian	
Irondequoit Limestone Formation	Silurian	
Kettle Point black Shale	Devonian	
Kwataboahegan Formation	Devonian	
Lockport Formation	Silurian	
Long Rapids Formation	Devonian	
Lowville Formation	Ordovician	
Manitoulin Formation	Silurian, Ordovician	
Meaford Formation	Ordovician	
Medina Group/Power Glen Formation	Silurian	
Missinaibi Formation	Quaternary	
Murray Island Formation	Devonian	
Nottawasaga Group/Georgian Bay Formation	Ordovician	
Nottawasaga Group/Whitby Formation	Ordovician	
Ohio Shale	Devonian	
Onondaga Formation	Devonian	
Ottawa Formation	Ordovician	
Ottawa Group/Lowville Formation	Ordovician	
Oxford Formation	Ordovician	
Pamelia Formation	Ordovician	
Power Glen Formation	Silurian	
Power Glen Shale	Silurian	
Queenston Formation	Ordovician	
Rochester Shale	Silurian	
Scarborough Formation	Canada	
Sextant Formation	Devonian	
Simcoe Group/Bobcaygeon Formation	Ordovician	
Simcoe Group/Gull River Formation	Ordovician	
Simcoe Group/Lindsay Formation	Ordovician	
Simcoe Group/Verulam Formation	Ordovician	
St. Edmund Formation	Silurian	
Stooping River Formation	Devonian	
Thorold Formation	Silurian	
Trenton Group/Cobourg limestone Formation	Ordovician	
Trenton Group/Sherman Fall limestone Formation	Ordovician	
Verulam Formation	Ordovician	
Williams Island Formation	Devonian	
