= Glens Falls Formation =

Carbonate formation in the North East USA

Glens Falls
- Stratigraphic range: Late Ordovician
- Type: Formation
- Unit of: Trenton Group
- Sub-units: Shoreham Member; Larrabee Member; Montreal Member
- Overlies: Amsterdam Limestone

Lithology
- Primary: Limestone
- Other: Shale

Location
- Region: New York, Ontario
- Country: United States, Canada

Type section
- Named for: Glens Falls, NY
- Named by: (RUEDEMANN, 1912)

The Glens Falls formation is a unit of the Trenton Group. The Glens Falls is a made up of limestone and contains thin fossiliferous beds. It was most likely deposited in shallow water due to the presence of ripple marks.

== Stratigraphy ==
In exposures in the Mohawk Valley this unit is approximately 17' thick. It contains highly fossiliferous beds made of limestone.

The Shoreham member is the upper member of the formation. It contains much more clay and silica, resulting in beds of shale. Name after a quarry in Vermont.

The Larrabee Member is the lower member. It contains some clay in silica but has more carbonate material than the Shoreham. Name after a quarry in Vermont.

== Fossils ==
Trilobite Cryptolithus

== Economic Uses ==
The limestone in the Glens Falls has been used for agricultural lime, used as lime for cement manufacturing, and crushed aggregate for road beds.
