= Arkell Spring Grounds =

Natural spring and water source in Ontario

The Arkell Spring Grounds is an aquifer-fed spring located in Arkell, Ontario, Canada. The spring is owned by the city of Guelph and provides local residents with the majority of their drinking water.

== History ==
Guelph began using groundwater as a principal source of drinking water in 1879 and began exploiting the Arkell Spring in 1903, though no agreement between Arkell and Guelph was formalized until 1908. Construction began on a watercourse to the city in August 1908 but was slowed by the spring water welling up into the trench being dug by work crews, and in October and November of that year, the work crews used dynamite as a way of quickly clearing the route. Arkell Springs was the site of the first tree planting campaign to protect a Canadian city's water supply.

After authorities in the United States uncovered an alleged conspiracy by German saboteurs to destroy infrastructure in the USA and Canada, fears of similar plots emerged in Guelph. In July 1915, the Guelph Mercury newspaper reported on rumours of an attack against the community, suggesting that the immigrant community in the St. Patrick's Ward neighbourhood had sabotaged the pipeline which transported water from the Arkell Spring to the city, and blamed them for an outbreak of disease that had occurred earlier in the year. At the time, the neighbourhood had more immigrants than anywhere else in Guelph, many of them coming from German, Austrian, and other European countries. The scare prompted an investigation by Ontario's Provincial Board of Health, which sent a team of physicians and a sanitary inspector to inspect the pipeline. While the pipe had not been sabotaged, the team discovered that cracks in the water main had allowed swamp water contaminated with animal droppings to mix with the water from Arkell Spring, and Guelph was put on a boil-water advisory until repairs could be made.

In the 1960s, the city of Guelph began establishing modern wells on the Arkell Spring Grounds that have remained in continuous operation ever since. Beginning with Arkell 7 in 1964, Guelph has established five additional wells in the area: Arkell 1 and Arkell 6 in 1967; Arkell 8 in 1989; and Arkell 14 and Arkell 15 in 2012. The Arkell Aqueduct was also constructed in 1964. Canadian geographer Paul Birchan has suggested Guelph's use of the Arkell Spring played a major role in Guelph residents overwhelmingly voting against fluoridation in 1964 and 1972.

The Arkell Springs Grounds were shut down in April 2020 in compliance with provincial restrictions meant to limit the spread of COVID-19 but reopened in February 2021.

== Hydrology ==
The water which wells up at the Arkell Springs is groundwater. When rain falls in the area, it sinks into the ground and is filtered through vegetation before being deposited at the bedrock. The Arkell Spring Grounds are situated above the Dyer Bay, Rockway (possibly Reynales), and Fossil Hill Formations, geological formations which are themselves rested on top of the Cabot Head Shale. The Amabel and Guelph Formations have been found as outcrops on the grounds' eastern and western fringes, respectively.

Guelph is one of the largest cities in Canada which uses groundwater as its principal source of water. An estimated 55-80% of the city's water supply is derived from the Arkell Spring Grounds, located in the municipal "Southeast Quadrant" well system. Although located outside the city limits, the Arkell Springs Grounds exist on a 350 hectares (860 acres) plot owned by the City of Guelph. The six wells on this property range 14.2–44.2 metres (47–145 ft) in depth and are located next to natural heritage lands. Most of the Arkell wells produce 6,500 m^{3} of water per day but the most shallow well, Arkell 1, draws only 2,000 m^{3} per day. The city collects groundwater from Arkell Springs using small pipes which empty into the Arkell Aqueduct, a non-pressurized gravity aqueduct made of concrete, transporting the water 6 kilometres (3.7 mi) to F.M. Woods Pumping Station and Reservoir, a water filtration facility where it is treated with sodium hypochlorite.

To supplement the groundwater supply during the yearly high-demand period between April and November, an artificial recharge system draws water from the Eramosa River into an infiltration trench, keeping the spring filled up to a potentiometric surface so that it can remain at full capacity even as demand from the city drains it. Of this, roughly 50% of the water taken from the river is recovered while the remainder returns to the river; a 2017 survey using infrared imagery found several groundwater seeps where the Arkell Spring feeds into the Eramosa River. A 1982 report by the Grand River Implementation Committee determined that the recharge system would allow the city of Guelph to keep up with demand for drinking water until 2031, and recommended the Arkell Springs system be expanded by 2021; a 2014 report suggested that demand would actually outmatch supply by 2023. A Class Environmental Assessment performed by Guelph between 1999 and 2006 investigated the potential expansion of the Arkell Springs system, and a 2009 study found that the Eramosa/Arkell Intake was the only subwatershed of the Grand River at risk of being stressed by local demand. Additional bedrock wells installed during the 2011-2012 season have increased the system's output by 6,900-8,000 m^{3} per day.

Municipal studies have investigated the possibility that the water could become contaminated by chemical spills and pollution from the Eramosa River.

== Conservation ==
In 1964, red pine plantations were established around the Arkell Spring Grounds. An initiative by the Guelph municipal government is reforesting the Arkell Spring area to improve the amount and quality of groundwater available. As the introduced red pine population thins due to poor soil conditions and overpopulation, the Guelph municipal government seeds endemic plants to replace them and create a more diverse forest environment. Rather than allow the pines to die off naturally, they are cut down outside of wildlife breeding seasons, with some being removed while others are left to decompose.

Nearby landowners have also contributed to diversifying the woodland. In early 2007, the owners of the Cove Valley Farm in Halton, which borders the Arkell Spring area, were granted the 2006 Watershed Award by the Grand River Conservation Authority for conservation efforts such as the planting of 7,000 white pines beginning in 1980 and their construction of a roofed manure storage area which limits the amount of runoff pollution entering the groundwater reserves.

== Recreation ==
The Arkell Spring Grounds is not a public park. However, certain sections of the property are managed by the Guelph Hiking Club and the Guelph Off-Road Biking Association (GORBA). The two groups maintain over a dozen marked trails on the Arkell Spring Grounds. Only members of their organizations are allowed to use the trails on the property.

There are roughly 10 kilometres (6.2 mi) of trails on the Arkell Spring Grounds. Hiking trails are maintained by the Guelph Hiking Club and marked with red and blue signage, while bike paths are maintained by GORBA and have yellow and green signage. Mixed-use trails are maintained by both organizations. Common hazards encountered on the property include large rocks, above-ground roots, and steep inclines.

The sections of the Arkell Spring Grounds which are not accessible by marked trails are considered off-limits in order to protect the water supply and limit visitors' exposure to hazards. Some former trails have been made into operational areas that are now closed to visitors.

There are no parking areas for vehicles on the Arkell Spring Grounds or any adjacent roads, limiting access to the property.
