= Bobcaygeon Formation =

Geologic formation in Ontario

- Stratigraphic range: Blackriveran to Trentonian
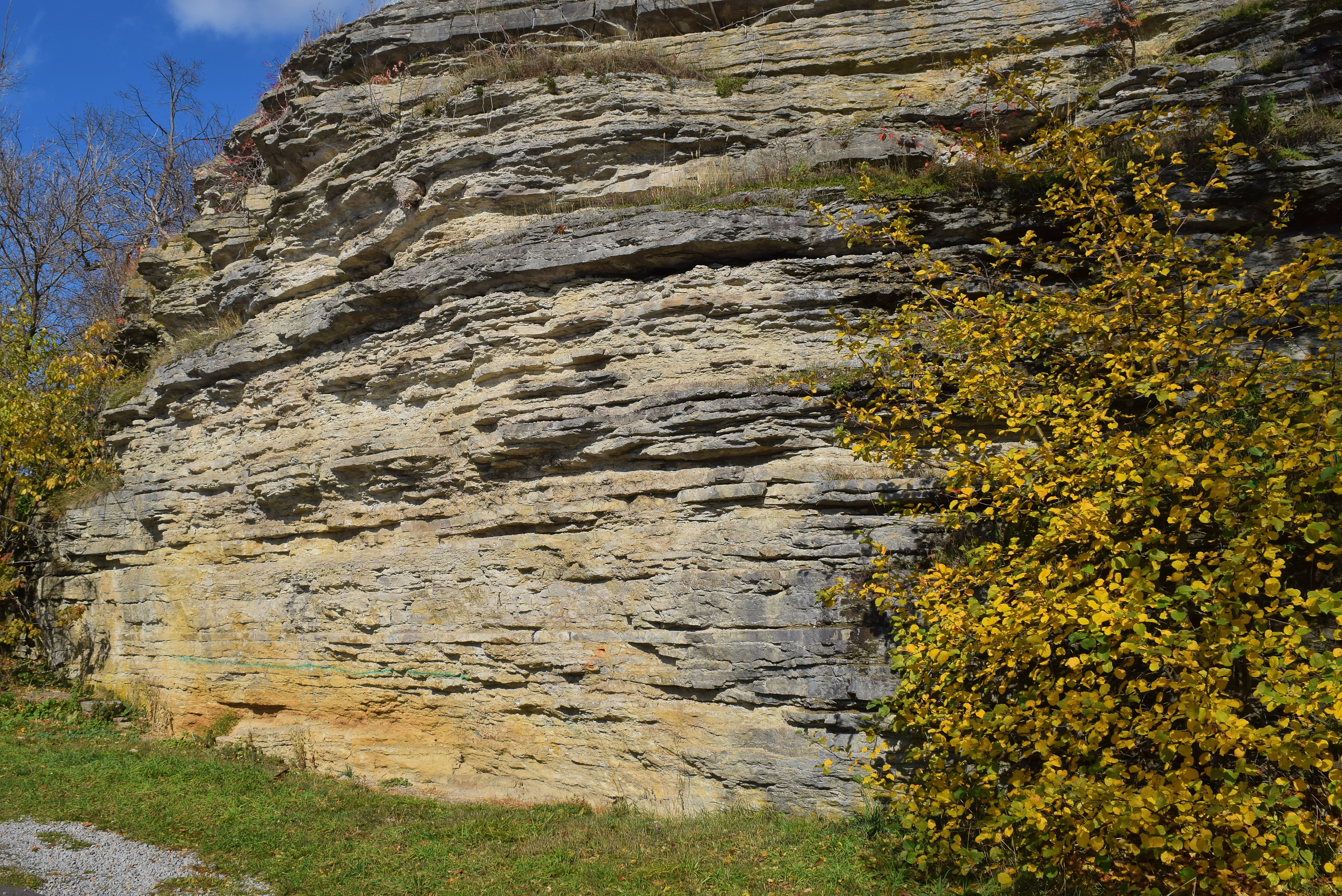
- Bobcaygeon Formation outcropping in Fenelon Falls.
- Type: Formation
- Unit of: Simcoe Group
- Sub-units: Three members (units C, D, and E)
- Underlies: Verulam Formation
- Overlies: Gull River Formation
- Thickness: Up to 91 metres (300 ft)

Lithology
- Primary: Limestone

Location
- Region: Ontario
- Country: Canada

Type section
- Named for: Bobcaygeon
- Named by: B.A. Liberty
- Year defined: 1969

The Bobcaygeon Formation is a geologic formation in Ontario. It preserves fossils dating back to the Ordovician period.

== See also ==
- List of fossiliferous stratigraphic units in Ontario
