= Shadow Lake Formation =

Geologic unit in Canada

Shadow Lake formation
- Stratigraphic range: Middle Ordovician
- Type: Geological formation
- Unit of: Black River & Simcoe Groups
- Underlies: Gull River Formation
- Overlies: Grenville basement Loysburg Formation
- Thickness: 0–10 m (0–33 ft)

Lithology
- Primary: Sandstone, conglomerate
- Other: Siltstone, shale

Location
- Region: Ontario, Pennsylvania
- Country: Canada, United States

Type section
- Named for: Shadow Lake
- Named by: Liberty
- Year defined: 1969

The Shadow Lake formation is a geological unit that crops out in Southern Ontario, Canada and northern Pennsylvania, United States. The shaly sections act as a caprock to petroleum reservoirs.

== Description ==
The oldest Paleozoic strata in the north Lake Simcoe area consist of the mainly siliciclastic sediments of the Shadow Lake Formation. These strata lie unconformably and sharply on the Precambrian Grenville basement, however, this basal contact is rarely exposed. The Shadow Lake Formation is poorly exposed, typically occurring in small isolated outcrops along a low escarpment capped by the more resistant carbonate beds of the overlying Gull River Formation. Trending roughly east—west across the study area and ringing Paleozoic outliers, this escarpment marks the edge of the Paleozoic outcrop belt.

The Shadow Lake Formation consists of non-fossiliferous, red, maroon and green, poorly sorted, argillaceous, arkosic sandstones and conglomerates, arenaceous (sandy) siliciclastic mudstones (shales) and siltstones, and minor argillaceous dolomite and limestones. These rock types are commonly interbedded and gradational with each other.

The Shadow Lake Formation, originally named by Okulitch (1939) based on outcrops north of Coboconk, was redefined by Liberty (1969). Okulitch included dolomitic limestones in the top of Shadow Lake Formation, whereas Liberty assigned these strata to the overlying Gull River Formation.

The siliciclastic sediments of the Shadow Lake Formation are gradationally overlain by impure carbonates of the Gull River Formation. The upper contact of the Shadow Lake Formation is placed where its mainly siliciclastic sediments give way to mainly carbonate sediments (typically argillaceous dolomites) of the lower Gull River Formation. Natural weathering accentuates this contact, making it appear sharp in outcrop, whereas in drill core this contact can be difficult to pick out.

In Ontario, the Shadow Lake Formation ranges from 0 to 10 metres (0 to 33 ft) in thickness, and averages approximately 6 metres (20 ft) in thickness.

The formation also crops out in Pennsylvania, where it is unconformably overlying the Loysburg Formation.
