= Williams Island =

Williams Island may refer to several places:

- Williams Island Dam, in Richmond, Virginia, United States
- Williams Island (South Australia), located south-east of Port Lincoln, Australia
- Williams Island Formation, a geologic formation in Ontario, Canada
- Williams Island (Florida), a section of Aventura, Florida, United States
- Williams Island (Antarctica), off Thurston Island
- Williams Rocks, a group of islands in Antarctica

== See also ==
- King William Island, an island in the Kitikmeot Region of Nunavut, which is part of the Canadian Arctic Archipelago
