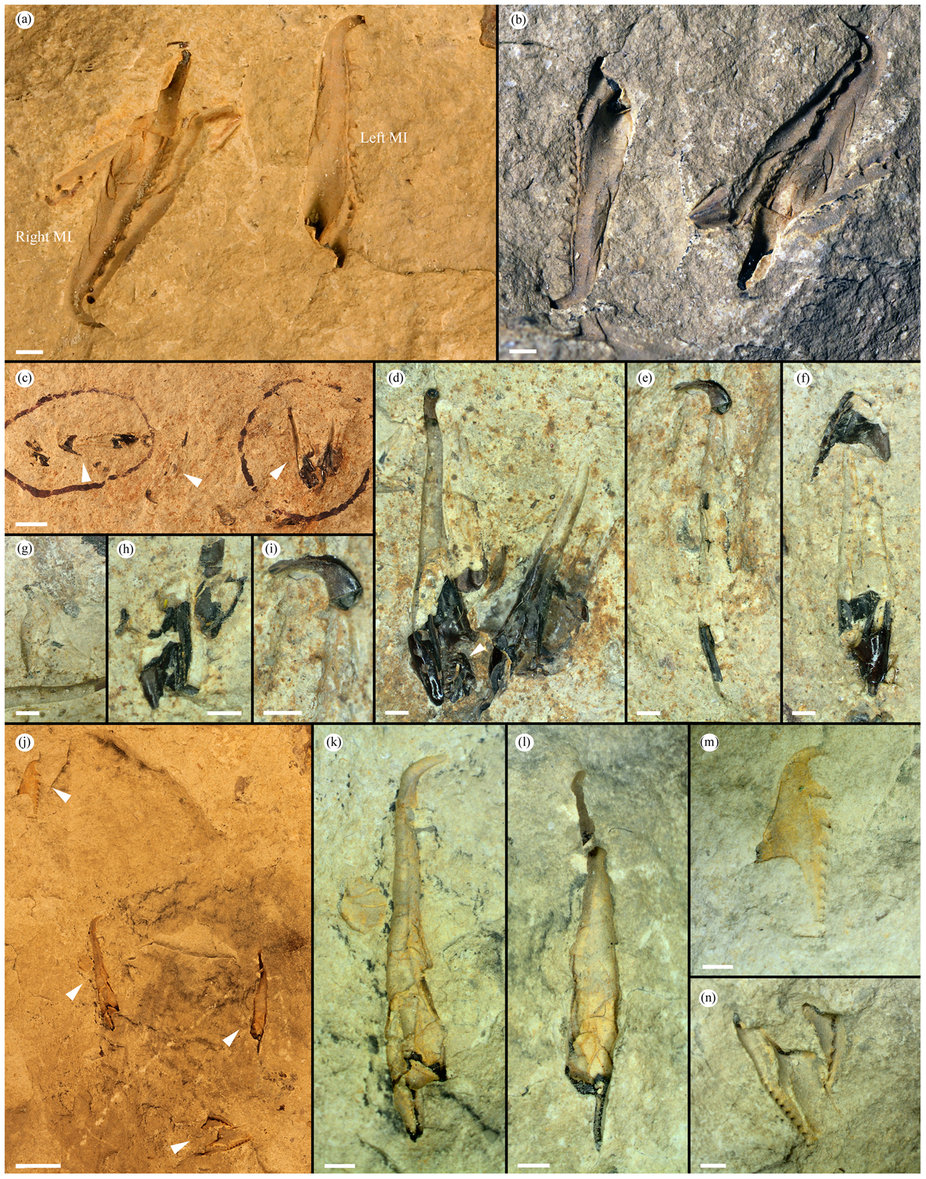

Scientific classification
- Kingdom: Animalia
- Phylum: Annelida
- Class: Polychaeta
- Genus: †Websteroprion; Eriksson et al., 2017
- Species: †W. armstrongi

Binomial name
- †Websteroprion armstrongi Eriksson et al., 2017

= Websteroprion =

Websteroprion Temporal range: Late Emsian-Early Eifelian ~393.3 Ma

Genus of annelid worms

Websteroprion ("Webster's saw") is a genus of eunicidan polychaete that lived during the middle Devonian period in what is now Canada. It contains a single species, W. armstrongi, recovered from the Kwataboahegan Formation.

== Etymology ==
The genus was named after the bassist Alex Webster of the death metal bands Cannibal Corpse and Blotted Science. The specific epithet armstrongi is named after Derek K. Armstrong who first collected the specimens.

== Description ==
Websteroprion is known from the maxillae of several individuals in one location. These maxillae reaching 1.32 cm (0.52 in) in length, with one incomplete specimen that supposed to be bigger in full size. These are the largest jaws of any fossil polychaete. A larger fossil jaw had been reported in 1934 but that specimen is too undiagnostic so it regarded as a nomen dubium. Referencing the jaw to body size ratio of other polychaetes, Websteroprion could have grown to 1–2 m (3 ft 3 in – 6 ft 7 in) long, though the exact size is unknown without soft tissue preservation.

The maxillae of Websteroprion are denticulate (having teeth-like structures), while those of extant eunicids and onuphids are not. However, larvae of these two modern families do have deticulated maxillae, possibly strengthening an ancestral connection between the groups.

No mandibles were found alongside the maxillae at the site of discovery, which leads to the possibility that these structures could not be preserved or that the maxillae were shed by Websteroprion while their mandibles were not.

== Paleoecology ==
The feeding practices of Websteroprion, though unknown, may be similar to the modern day Eunice aphroditois due to similarities in jaw structure. If this is true, Websteroprion would use its large jaws to eat live prey, algae, and decaying matter. However, the jaws of polychaetes do not necessarily designate specific feeding habits, so precise knowledge remains unknown without preserved gut content or soft tissue.

All of the specimens of Websteroprion are of a similar large size, which may indicate juveniles and adults had differing environmental preferences and thus would not be preserved together. Though juvenile specimens may have simply not been preserved.

The large size of Websteroprion is unique compared to other Devonian polychaetes, and the specific driving mechanisms for the increased size, whether intrinsic or extrinsic, are unknown.
