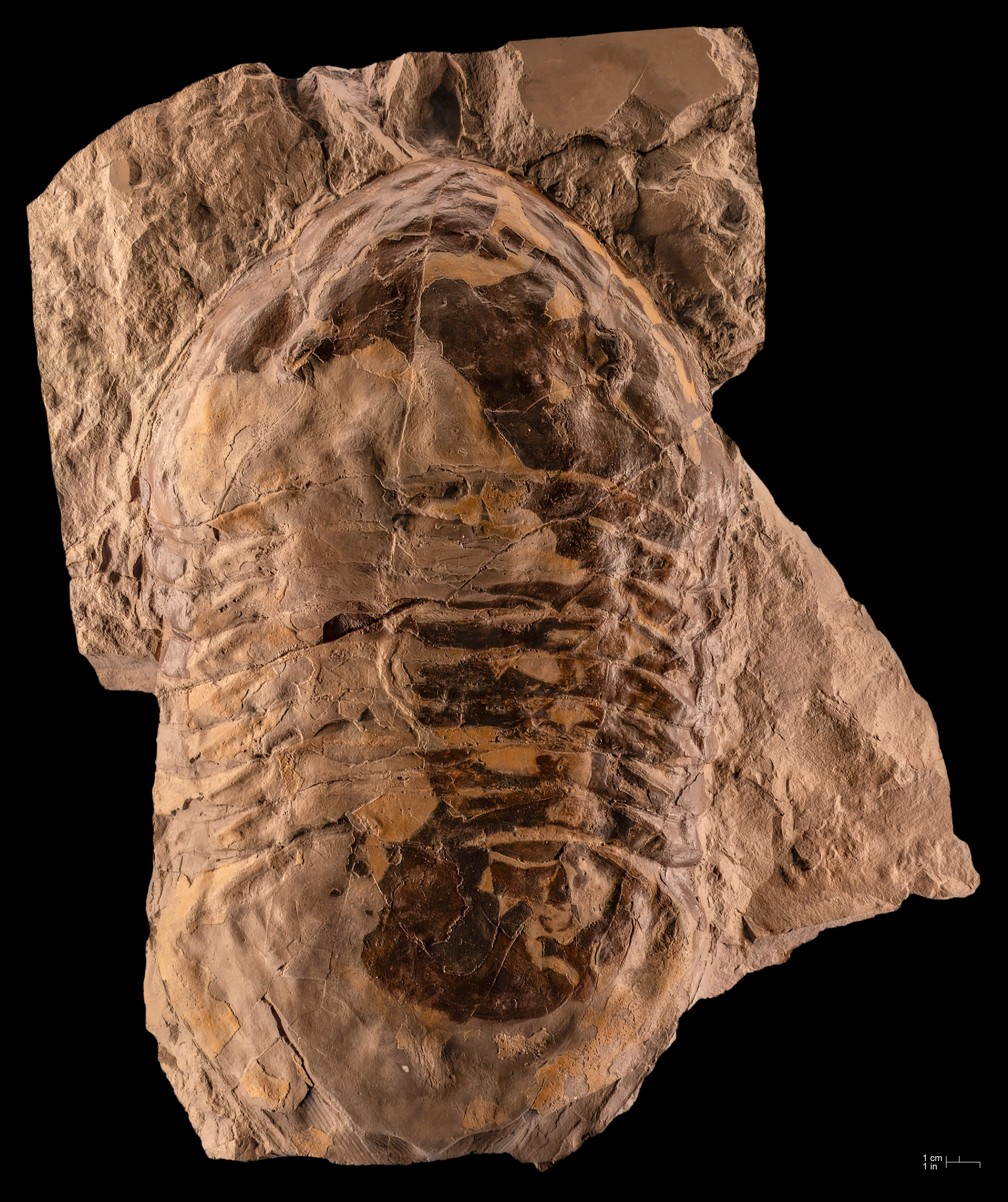
- Isotelus rex cast at the Royal Tyrrell Museum of Palaeontology
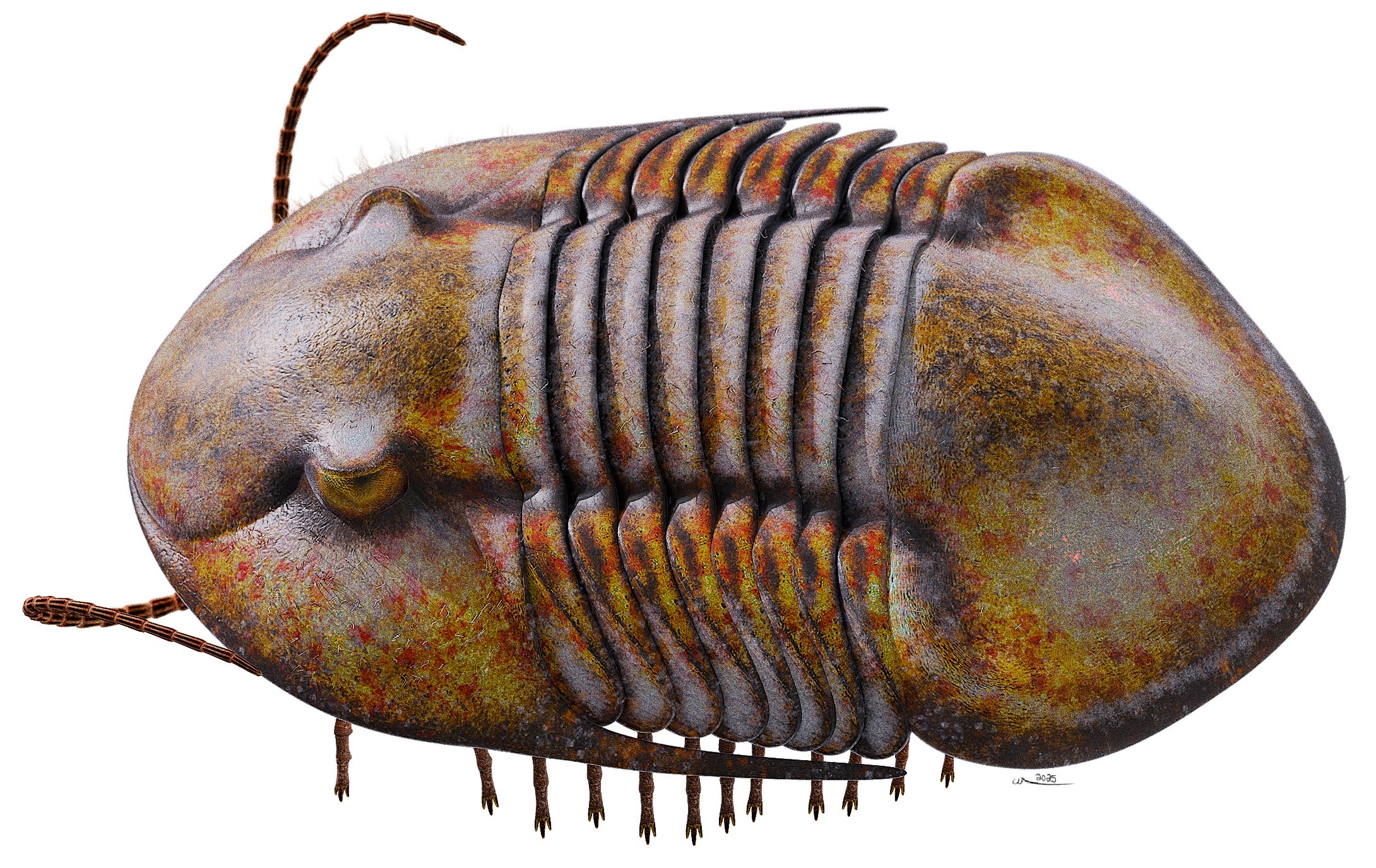
- Reconstruction of Isotelus maximus

Scientific classification
- Kingdom: Animalia
- Phylum: Arthropoda
- Clade: †Artiopoda
- Class: †Trilobita
- Order: †Asaphida
- Family: †Asaphidae
- Genus: †Isotelus; Dekay, 1824

Species
- See text

= Isotelus =

Isotelus Temporal range: Middle Ordovician–Late Ordovician

Extinct genus of trilobites

Isotelus (Greek for 'equal extremities') is an extinct genus of large asaphid trilobites from the Middle and Late Ordovician period, fairly common in the northeastern United States into eastern Canada. Isotelus is the state fossil of Ohio, and through multiple specimens from the 1800s into the modern day has held the title of largest trilobite fossil in the world, reaching over 70 centimetres (28 in) long. Isotelus was carnivorous and a burrower which lived in warm shallow seas, feeding on worms and other soft-bodied animals on and below the substrate. As larvae, Isotelus was planktonic, drifting in the water column with a morphology very different from the adult. Their distinctive morphology with a large shovel-like head, prominent eyes, long genal spines, and their enormous size, makes Isotelus one of the most sought after trilobites in North America.

== History ==
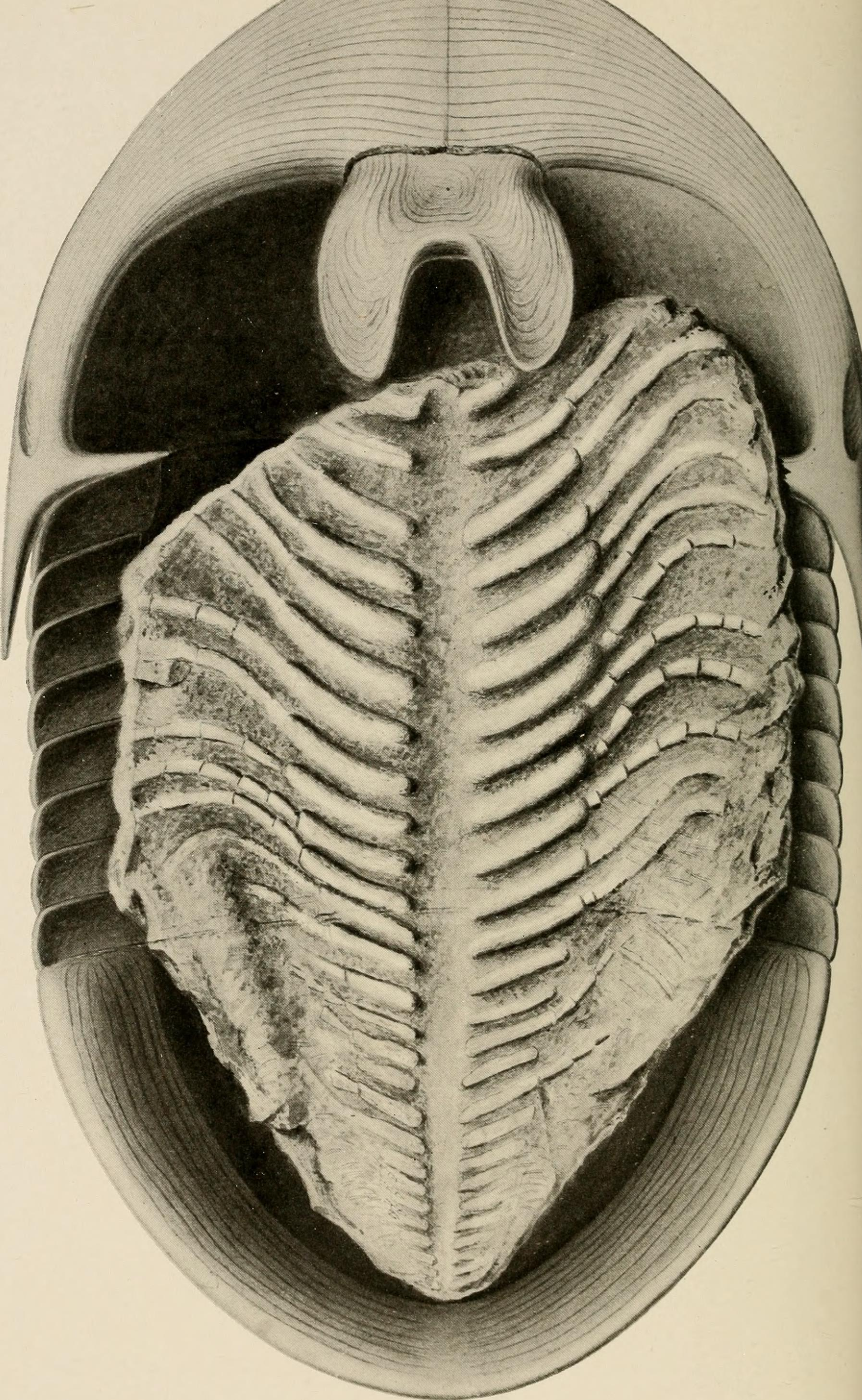
Specimen of Isotelus maximus preserving the legs and portions of the gills, as described by Walcott. The specimen does not preserve the test, and an illustration of the dorsal shell is presented with the Ohio specimen underneath it.

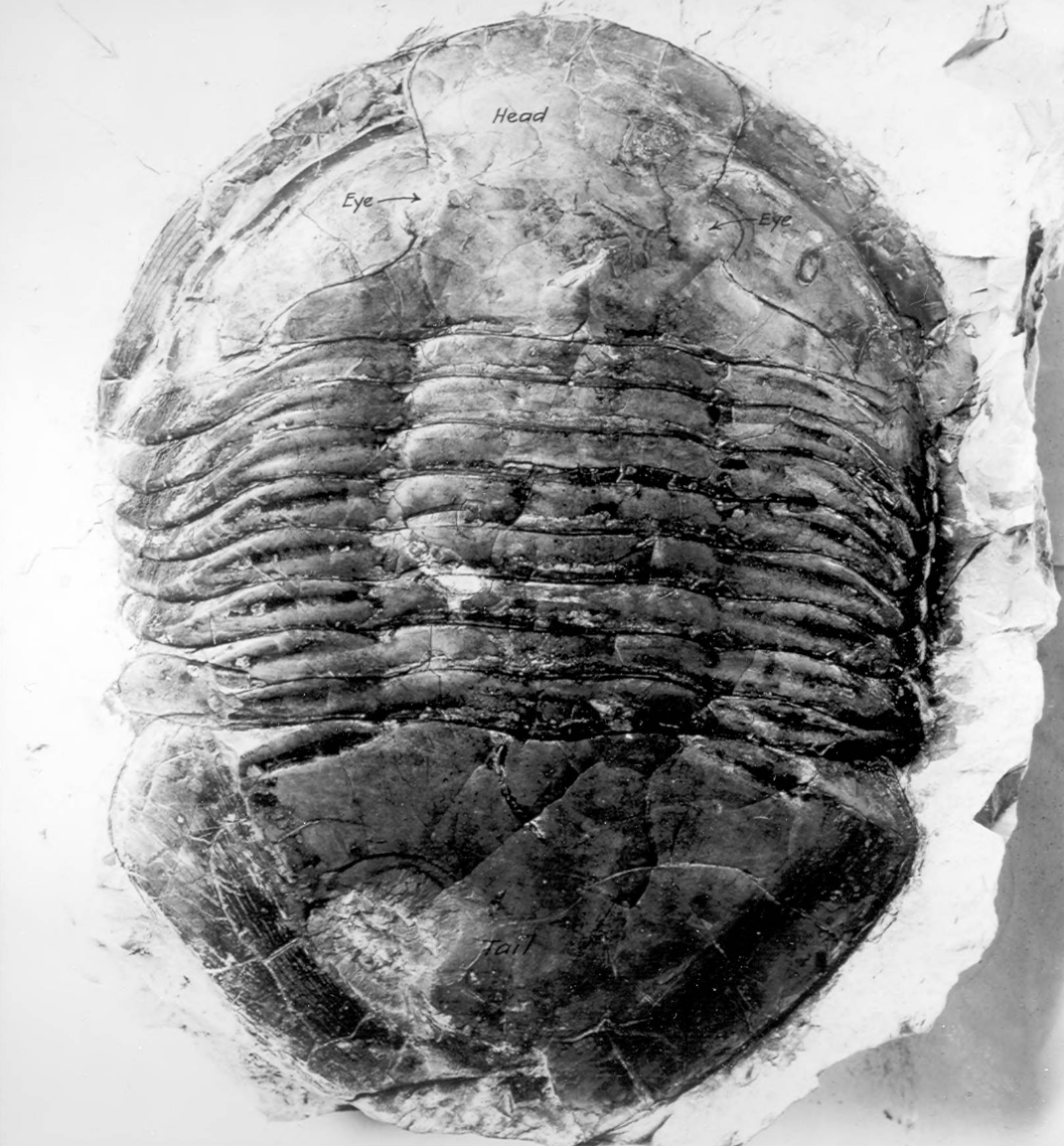
1919 photograph of the Huffman Dam specimen of Isotelus maximus ("Isotelus brachycephalus"), for many years considered the largest complete trilobite in the world.

By published accounts, fossils of Isotelus were first discovered by John Sherman at Trenton Falls, within the rocks of the Trenton Group, and later described by palaeontologist and zoologist James Ellsworth De Kay in 1824. He named the specimens Isotelus gigas in reference to their large size, and a smaller specimen which he named Isotelus planus, which he considered possibly synonymous with a larger species (a view upheld by Rudkin and Tripp). It was also discovered early on near Dunkinsville, Ohio, where palaeontologist John Locke, as part of a long-running geological survey of the state, discovered a single large fragment of Isotelus, the pygidium. By comparing it with complete specimens of other species he determined this individual was probably around 53 centimetres (21 in) in length. He named the new species Isotelus maximus in reference to its enormous size, noting that locals of the area referred to trilobite fossils as "petrified locusts, butterflies, bugs, and frogs". In the autumn of 1882, professor John Mickleborough was sent a fossil (found by a Mr. D. S. McCord, an Ohioan resident) of I. maximus (which he referred to as Asaphus megistos) that was exposed ventrally, and apparently preserved the legs. The counterpart of the same specimen was discovered a year later and sent as well. This was the first ever definitive fossil to preserve the legs of a trilobite, which despite their extensive fossil record, had otherwise remained enigmatic, and so he described the fossil in 1883. This description was followed up with studies of the fossil by Charles D. Walcott, who revealed further details including possible filaments of the exopodite gills. Numerous other species of Isotelus were discovered in the following century.

For many years, the largest complete specimen of a trilobite found anywhere in the world was a specimen of Isotelus brachycephalus (now generally considered a synonym of I. maximus) unearthed during the construction of an outlet tunnel for the Huffman Dam by workmen (who initially reported it as a fossil turtle), the specimen measuring 37 centimetres (15 in) in length and 25.5 centimetres (10.0 in) wide, a long-time display piece of the National Museum of Natural History. Inspired by this large fossil, a group of students local to the Dayton area successfully petitioned the local government to establish Isotelus as the official state fossil of Ohio on June 20, 1985 (later alongside Dunkleosteus). The title of largest complete trilobite in the world would be claimed again by Isotelus with the discovery of a complete specimen of the new species Isotelus rex by a team in Manitoba. Isotelus remains a highly sought-after trilobite among private collectors and museums.

== Description ==
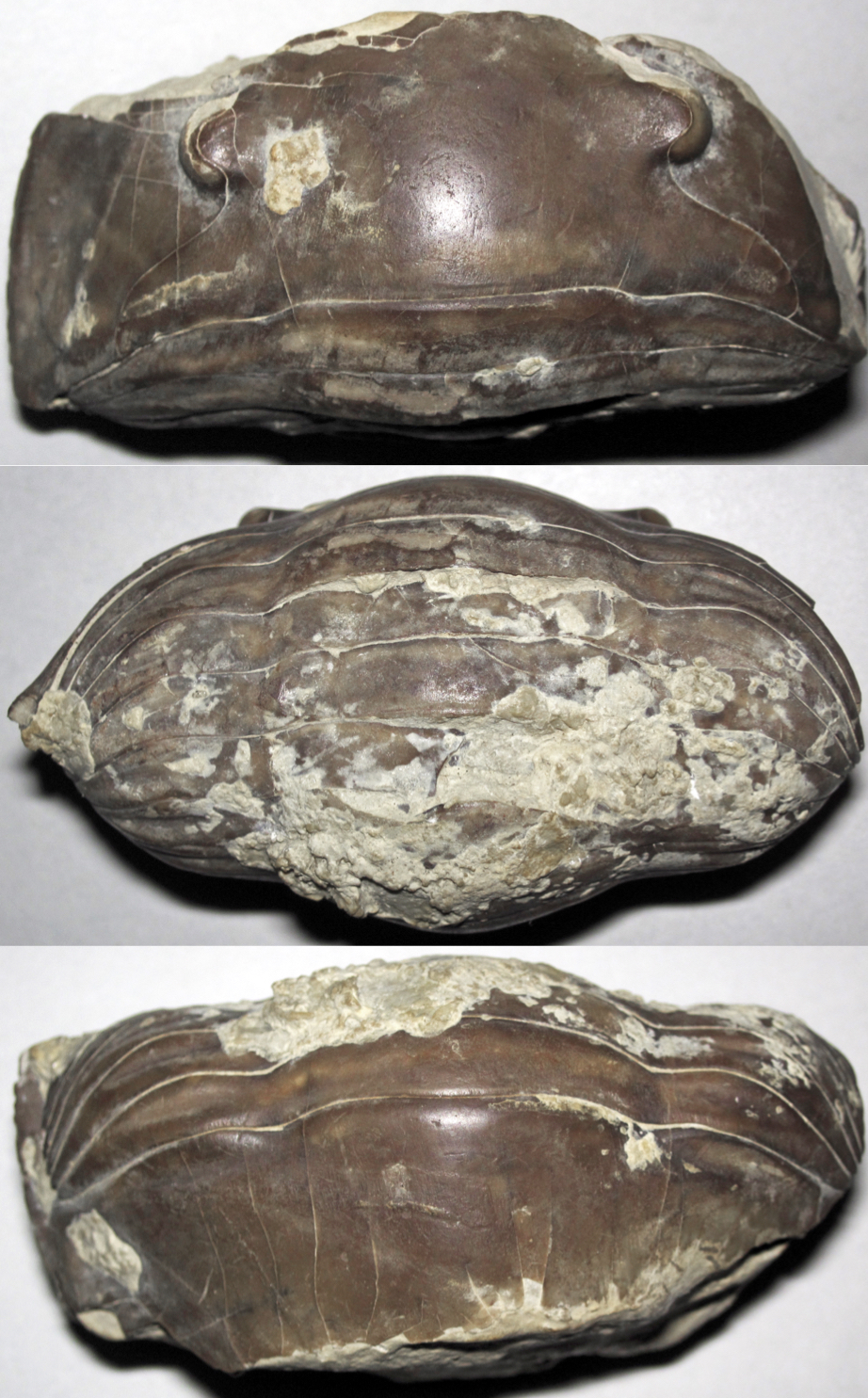
Enrolled specimen of Isotelus maximus

Isotelus is a large trilobite, with I. maximus reaching up to at least 53 centimetres (21 in) in length, and I. rex up to 72 centimetres (28 in) in length. The dorsal shell, like all trilobites, consisted of a cephalon, a multisegmented thorax, and a pygidium. The cephalon was large, rounded, and mostly smooth (some small pores are found on the cephalon, particularly the free cheeks, or 'librigenae', on either side of the head), with large short eyes. The glabella (the bulbous central portion of the cephalon between and in front of the eyes) was sloping and poorly defined. The eyes were holochroal – in Isotelus iowensis there were up to around 5000 hexagonal lenses (or facets) per eye, the largest about 0.07 millimetres (0.0028 in) wide. The pair of thin genal spines at the corners of the cephalon are a diagnostic trait among species, with some species (such as I. rex and I. gigas) lacking genal spines entirely as adults, and in other species, the genal spines may reach as far back as the pygidium. The cephalon has a doublure which extrudes inwardly from the border, enclosing the underside slightly, and strongly terraced (forming step-like ridges). Attached to the doublure anteriorly was the hypostome, the trilobite mouthpart – it was large and forked in Isotelus, with 2 large posteriorly-facing prongs. The prongs were triangular in cross-section, with a basically flat ventral surface (although with a small lips around the edges), and a tall ridge on the dorsal, upwardly-facing surface. The hypostome was strongly terraced. The thorax is composed of eight segments of equal size. The segments are smooth dorsally, though marked with small pits and occasionally shallow bumps, while the short pleural lobes are marked by strongly sculpted "terraces" on their articulating facets (the surface which dips down anteriorly on the pleural lobe, and allows the segments to glide over each other when the trilobite enrolls or flexes). The axial furrow between the axial lobe and pleural lobes is shallow and smooth. The pygidium is expansive and mostly smooth, subtriangular in outline, with anterior articulating facets similar to the pleural lobes of the thorax. The axial and pleural lobes of the pygidium are poorly defined, with a shallow furrow dividing the border of the pygidium from the central portion. The border extends ventrally into a doublure, which slightly encloses the underside, and is strongly terraced.

=== Ventral anatomy and patterning ===
The limbs of Isotelus are poorly preserved, with the Ohio specimen showing at least 26 pairs of identical legs. Each of the 8 thorax segments would possess a single leg pair, with 3 beneath the cephalon, and about 16 pairs beneath the pygidium. The protopodite base of the leg was large and flattened vertically, and the subsequent podomeres of the leg were all cylindrical and slender. No evidence for endites on the legs is known. As with other trilobites, a pair of anteriorly directed antennae would have been present. The second pair of cephalic legs was possibly differeniated, being smaller and more inwardly directed towards the hypostome as an adaptation for food processing. Palaeontologist John Wells discovered probable color-markings on the dorsal shells of some specimens of Isotelus, which may hint at the original patterning. Higher concentrations of pigment are found within the axial furrows on the thorax (strongest at the anterior and posterior-most points of the axial furrows), which would have appeared in life as two dark strips running down the length of the body, extending slightly onto the cephalon and some distance onto the pygidium. The genal spines of the cephalon were darker (as they are in many trilobites with preserved pigmentation). There was a dark crescent-shaped region of pigmentation beneath the eye on the free cheek, extending slightly onto the glabella and palpebral lobe (the surface of shell which covers the eye dorsally).

== Paleobiology ==
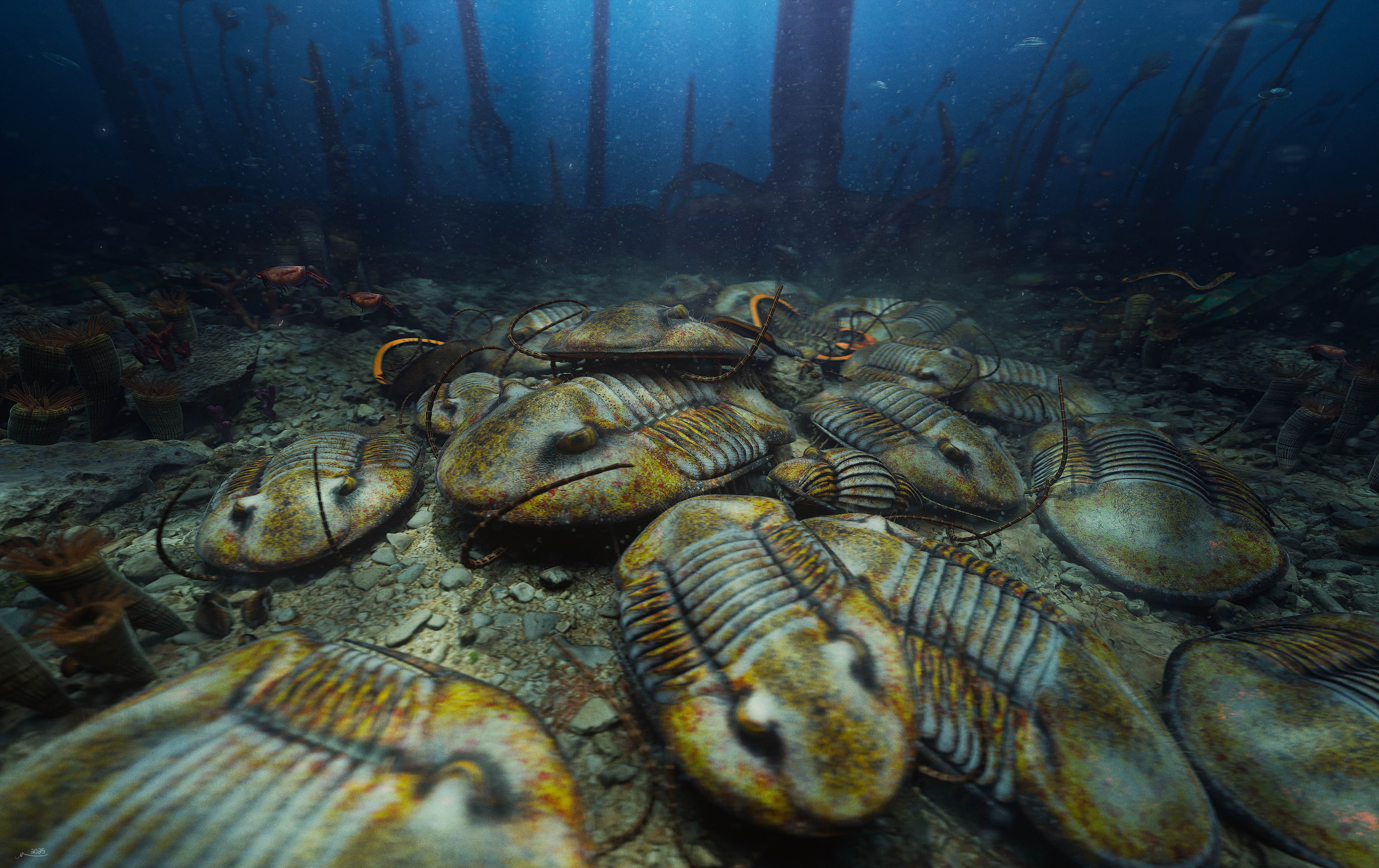
Reconstruction of a mass of Isotelus maximus, gathering to moult and reproduce

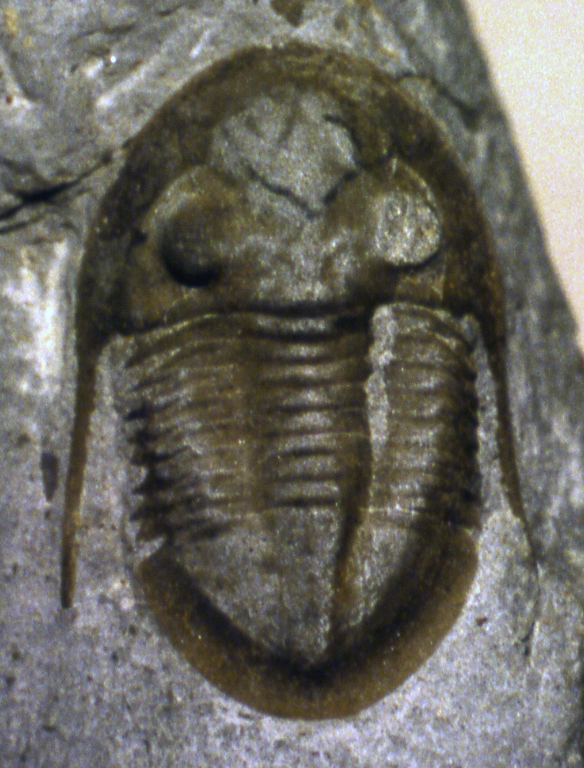
Specimen of a 1.8 centimetres (0.71 in) juvenile (meraspid) I. maximus with large eyes and genal spines

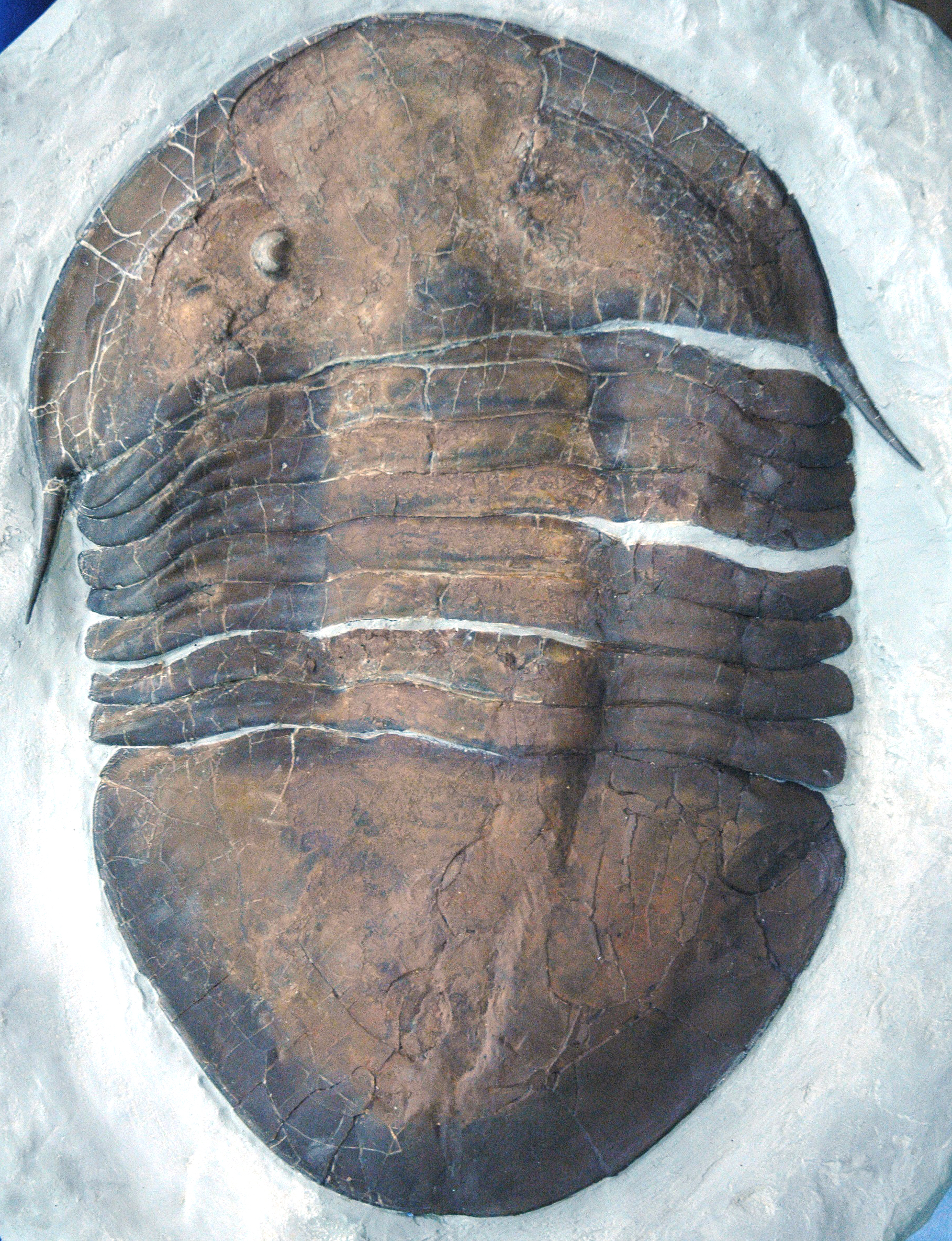
Specimen of a 40 centimetres (16 in) adult (holaspid) I. maximus with a missing right eye, assumed to be a healed injury

Isotelus, like all asaphid trilobites, did not survive past the Ordovician-Silurian mass extinction event. Asaphidae, like all other derived asaphide trilobite families, are inferred to have a unique and lengthy planktonic larval phase, only becoming benthic like adults after metamorphosis. The first instar larvae of Isotelus for instance were just 0.6 mm long, becoming benthic and adult-like at 8–10 mm long. The larvae of Isotelus had a globular shape, with a pair of long spines on the anterior and ventral extremities of the exoskeleton; attached was a large hypostome that mostly enclosed the dorsal shell, which itself was covered in a number of spines. The exoskeleton consisted of a single piece representing both the proto-cephalon and proto-pygidium, with sutures separating the already developed free cheeks. There were a small number of ocelli eyes on the free cheeks. In addition to multiple stages of the protaspid phase, there was likely a stage prior to protaspid where the trilobite was soft-bodied, and thus left no obvious fossil record. As there is a wide diversity of adult morphology in the aforementioned trilobite families, this tiny planktonic larval phase that they share may be the link to their extinction. Most trilobites with this life history strategy lived in warm, low latitude waters, in which planktonic, non-adult like larvae may be ideal at surviving in. During the Ordovician-Silurian extinction event, the widespread onset of cold water conditions and anoxia may have instead favoured species that produced small numbers of large eggs, from which hatched larvae that were already benthic and adult-like in morphology. During the later meraspid stage and adulthood, Isotelus may have used emptied nautiloid shells lying on the sea floor as temporary sanctuaries for moulting, when the exoskeleton was soft and the trilobite was vulnerable. Isotelus specimens with pathologies are rare, but some have been reported, including a specimen of Isotelus iowensis with an injury to the border of the cephalon. This injury was relatively small, and probably represents a failed predation attempt.

=== Feeding ===
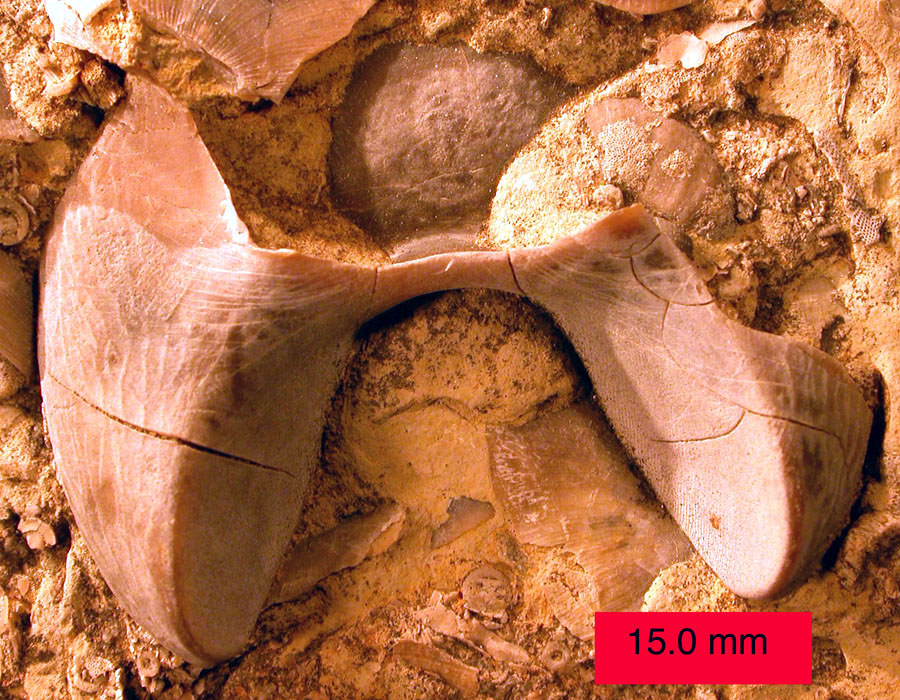
Hypostome of the trilobite Isotelus (Ordovician, southern Ohio)

The large, forked hypostome of Isotelus was rigidly attached to the doublure of the hypostome, and displays no adaptations suitable for filter feeding. The dorsal surface was marked with wavy terraces, but the inner, ventral surface was covered with much finer, unidirectional terraces, which have been theorized to function as a grinding surface. This theory suggested the presence of a differentiated pair of legs which were modified to grind prey against the hypostome, which would break the trend among known trilobites of the limbs being all undifferentiated. Fossil evidence for this limb pair (apparently the second), supposed to be smaller and directed inwardly towards the hypostome, awaits publication. The two prongs have been suggested to have acted like a claw-hammer, and in combination with burrowing, is suggested to have allowed Isotelus to pry soft-bodied worms out of sediment. Supporting this, Isotelus iowensis has, within the Maquoketa Shale, been found disproportionately in layers containing abundant Chondrites trace fossils left by worms, which they may have been feeding on. Furthermore, an exceptional, 17.5 centimetres (6.9 in) long specimen of Rusophycus carleyi, attributable to Isotelus generally, was discovered in the Ordovician strata of Clermont County, Ohio. This specimen is more detailed than typical Rusophycus, preserving the entire outline of the producer including the large genal spines, confirming its identity as Isotelus. It also includes a large, secondary trace of a worm burrow, passing beneath the trilobite and stopping beneath the head, the burrowing activity apparently halted by the trilobite suddenly digging in with all of its limbs, finding the worm, and devouring it before moving on.

=== Burrowing and terrace structures ===
Although a cluster of small shallow pits in the holotype of I. rex have been suggested to be caused by soft-bodied epibionts in life, even the largest specimens of Isotelus are rarely associated with any kind of symbiotic encrusting which is commonly found in large modern marine arthropods. This has been suggested as being due to either a low number of encrusting organisms in the environment, cuticular anti-fouling properties, or most likely, a semi-infaunal (below the sediment) mode of life, precluding extensive colonization by any encrusting organism. Isotelus had a large, shovel-like cephalon (comparable to the more developed shovel morphology of Trimerus), and the suggestion that Isotelus was a burrower is supported by numerous trace fossil specimens, including large traces ascribed to I. rex. It is suggested that Isotelus often buried itself in sediment, with only its eyes and portions of the dorsal exoskeleton exposed. It is suspected that such a life style made it easy for them to become fossilized by allowing rapid burial and preventing the carcasses from becoming disarticulated.

The doublure surfaces and articulacting facets of Isotelus were ornamented with strong terraced sculpture. Although this is an extremely common feature of the trilobite exoskeleton, their function is the subject of some debate. Along the doublure, the terrace ridges are directed away from the axis of the body, curving over the edge of the tergite onto the dorsal surface where they are now directed towards the axis. On the articulating facets, the terrace ridges are directed posteriorly. The terraces are associated with microscopic canals within the cuticle, rising perpendicular to the surface and turning sharply into small, open pits on the scarp edge of the terrace. The terraced surface is associated with accessory pits, also opening into small pits, but found between the ridges. Isotelus is among the few trilobites which possess buttressing cuticular folds which press up against the scarp-side of the terraces perpendicularly. As the trilobite grew, the terraces were copied onto the new exoskeleton, with new terraces occasionally added between the old ones to maintain a constant distance between the ridges throughout ontogeny. The function of the terrace ridges is not confirmed, but they are theorized to have played a role in either controlling friction and sediment guiding during burrowing, or more likely, a mechanoreceptor function. The canals and pits are believed to have originally house tiny sensory hairs called setae (more specifically, the smaller setae are referred to as microtrichs, and the larger as macrotrichs), which would have (in the case of the pits along the scarp) been angled in the direction of the terraces. Like some modern crustaceans (such as Procambarus, Homarus, and Asellus), these sensory hairs, angled by the terrace ridge, could have served as current detectors – as water ran over the hair and deflected it one way or another, the trilobite could sense which way the water current was moving over its body. The accessory pits and associated macrotrich setae could have provided additional tactile information.

The thoracic pleurae have depressed doublures, which are terraced similarly. When the articulating facet of one pleura glides over the one behind it, the terrace ridges criss-cross, leaving small passages open to the surrounding sea water. This would allow the trilobite, though tightly enrolled, to continue respiring oxygenated sea water through the gill branches of the limbs, and thus remain enrolled indefinitely. There were one or several terrace ridges running perpendicular to the rest on the surface of the articulating facet, probably also lined with mechanoreceptor setae, which would have allowed the trilobite to sense its state of enrollment in detail.

=== Distribution ===
Isotelus is known from across North America, in the United States and Canada. Isotelus is usually associated with typical Ordovician fauna, including brachiopods, various crinoids, nautiloids, other trilobites, the tubeworm Cornulites, and soft-bodied annelids known from trace fossil evidence. It is usually found in warm shallow seas, in shelf-environments. Specimens of the species I. rex were found in the Churchill River Group, in sediments that were once a warm, rocky, shallow subtidal zone along an Ordovician shoreline. During the Late Ordovician, this area would have been at the equator. Because it was found near the palaeoequator, I. rex is a dramatic example of low-latitude gigantism, contrasting with many modern marine benthic arthropods which adhere to Bergmann's rule of polar gigantism. Similarly, most other giant trilobites lived in shallow tropical or mid latitude waters (e.g., Terataspis, Cambropallas, Acadoparadoxides), although a few like Uralichas and multiple species from the Fezouata biota (nearly polar, with trilobites reaching up to about 50 centimetres (20 in)) were from cold, high-latitude waters.

== Species ==
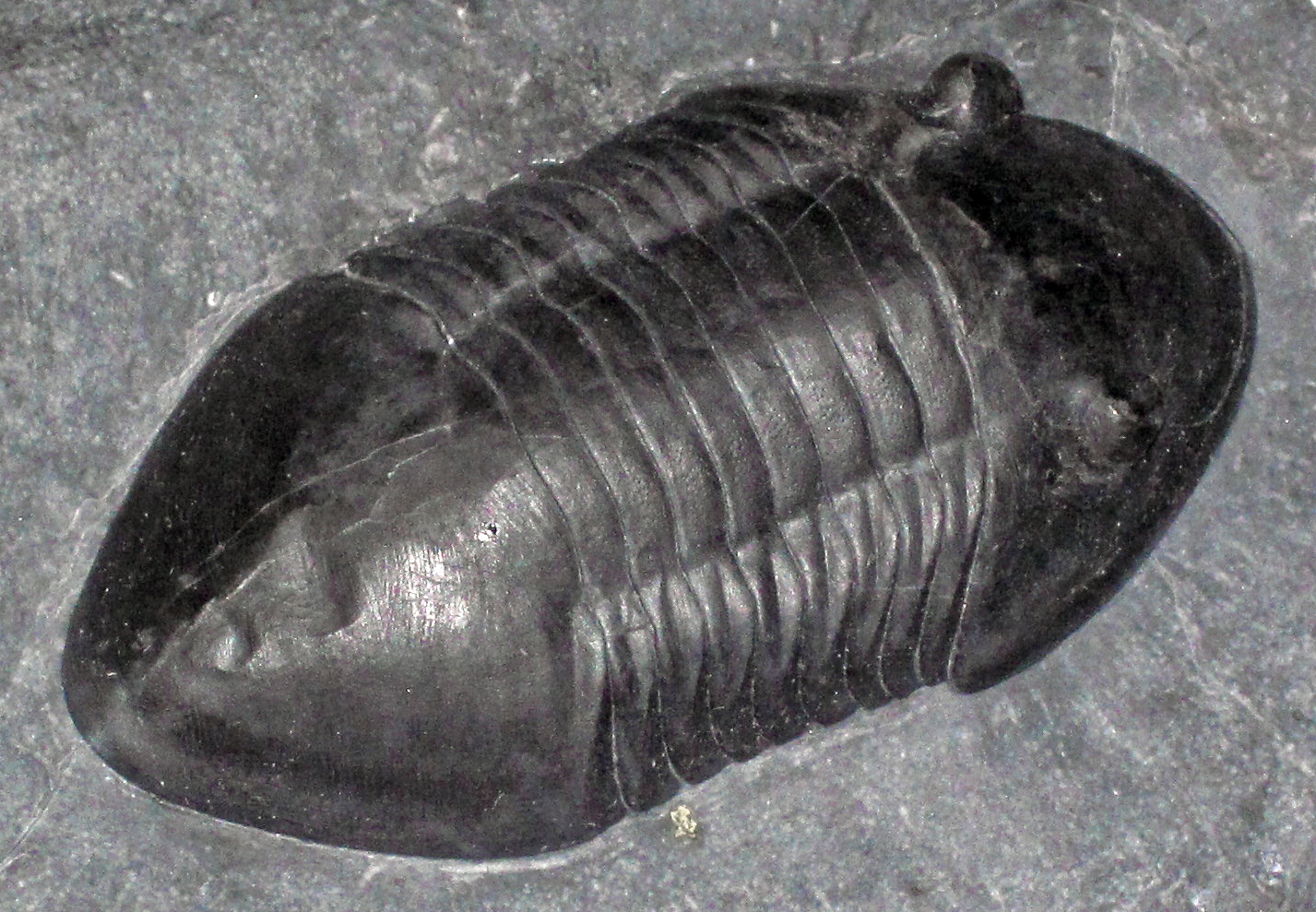
Specimen of Isotelus gigas from the Walcott-Rust quarry

Isotelus has wide morphological diversity even within individual species, and having been known since 1824, a large number of species have been proposed. However, because of that morphological range, it is difficult to establish which species of Isotelus are valid, and this has scarcely been attempted. The following list follows the scheme proposed by Lisa Amati in 2014, which groups most of the known species into three groups. The final group is left in questionable taxonomy, as these species likely do not clade with the rest of the Isotelus species, and may in the future warrant a new genus to contain them, but for now are referred to as "Isotelus". Some species were not included in any of these groups, such as Isotelus cyclops, Isotelus megalops, and Isotelus stegops, all named in the same 1832 paper by Jacob Green, or the proposed Belarusian species Isotelus remigium. Until a complete revision is done, this list should be considered provisional.

=== Group 1 ===
This group is defined by facial sutures which are "roughly parallel in front of the palpebral lobes before angling inward to intersect at the midline", or in simpler terms, a cranidium (the central portion of the cephalon, flanked by the paired librigenae) with an essentially triangular shape. It includes the type species, I. gigas.

- Type species Isotelus gigas Dekay, 1824 – The type species of Isotelus, first described by James Ellsworth De Kay. This is one of the two species present in the Cincinnatian strata of Ohio, alongside I. maximus. It is differentiated by its much smaller adult size, its thinner profile, a broadly triangular cephalon and pygidium, and an absence of genal spines in larger adults. This species is also found in Iowa, Indiana, Wisconsin, Kentucky, Michigan, Missouri, New York, Pennsylvania, Ontario, Quebec, and Nunavut.
- Isotelus copenhagenensis Ross Jr. & Shaw 1972 – Named after the Copenhagen Formation strata where it was discovered in Nevada.
- Isotelus kimmswickensis Bradley 1930 – Species with a very short cephalon, found in the Goetz quarry in Missouri.
- Isotelus homalonotoides Walcott 1877 – From the Decorah Shale.
- Isotelus violaensis Amati 2014 – Found in the Viola Springs Formation of Oklahoma.

=== Group 2 ===
This group is defined by a cranidium which "narrows strongly immediately in front of the palpebral lobes and widens gradually as the facial sutures curve gently forward and outward; the widest point of the cranidium in front of the palpebral lobes is at the inflection point where the facial sutures turn to become directed inward to the mid-line". In simpler terms, the isolated cranidium in this group appears more arrow-shaped, with the sutures constricting inwardly anterior to the eyes. This suture pattern is also seen in Isoteloides, and is thus thought to be a plesiomorphic trait compared to apomorphic suture pattern of Group 1.

- Isotelus parvirugosus Chatterton & Ludvigsen 1976 – Found in the Northwest Territories of Canada.
- Isotelus dorycephalus Hunda et al.. 2003 – Also found in the Northwest Territories of Canada.
- Isotelus iowensis Owen 1852 – Found in Illinois, Iowa, Michigan, Minnesota, Missouri, Ontario, and Nunavut.
- Isotelus walcotti Walcott 1918 – (Junior synonym I. planus) Found in Iowa, Wisconsin, and New York.
- Isotelus giselae Tripp and Evitt 1986 – Known from Virginia.
- Isotelus bradleyi Amati 2014 – Also found in the Viola Springs Formation of Oklahoma.
- Isotelus skapaneidos Amati 2014 – Named for its shovel-shaped cranidium, known from Oklahoma.

=== Group 3 ===
The third grouping proposed by Amati has a similar suture profile to Group 2, but are very wide relative to their length, and have shorter, rounded pygidiums with broad borders. Amati suggests that this group, if a phylogenetic analysis were performed, would not clade with the other species of Isotelus (which would clade closer to the genus Ectenaspsis), and thus may warrant a new genus to contain them. For now, they are referred to as "Isotelus".

- Isotelus maximus Locke 1838 – One of the two Isotelus species present in the Cincinnatian strata of Ohio, alongside I. gigas. This species a much greater maximum size, and is easily differniated by its semi-circular cephalon and pygidium, and by the larger genal spines which are present in all adult specimens. In addition to Ohio, this species is found in Illinois, Indiana, Kentucky, Virginia, Missouri, Ontario, and Manitoba.
- Isotelus rex Rudkin et al.. 2003 – The largest species of Isotelus, known from fragmentary specimens and rare complete individuals. The mostly complete holotype specimen of I. rex, from Churchill River Group, Churchill, Manitoba, is the largest complete trilobite ever found. Discovered by Dave Rudkin (Royal Ontario Museum), Robert Elias (University of Manitoba), Graham Young (Manitoba Museum) and Edward Dobrzanske (Manitoba Museum) in 1999, it measures 720 millimetres (28 in) in length, 400 millimetres (16 in) in maximum width (across the cephalon) and 70 millimetres (3 in) in maximum height (at the posterior midpoint of the cephalon). As an adult, this species lacked genal spines entirely, and is differentiated by its narrower body and more widely spaced eyes. It was probably exceeded in size only by Hungioides bohemicus, in which the specimens probably exceeding I. rex in size are only known from partial remains.
- Isotelus latus Raymond 1913 – Defined by a concave cephalic border, widest at the anterior.
- Isotelus ottawaensis Wilson 1947 – Eyes close to the posterior of the cephalon and close together, found in the Ottawa Formation.
