= St. Edmund Formation =

Geologic formation in Ontario

- Stratigraphic range: Silurian
- Type: Formation

Location
- Region: Ontario
- Country: Canada

The St. Edmund Formation is a geologic formation in Ontario. It preserves fossils dating back to the Silurian period.

It is located with a number of nearby formations, namely that of Cabot Head and Wingfield in the cliff exposure at Rocky Bay (Also called Clay Cliffs), approximately 3.5 km West of Cabot Head. Initially described as dolomite in 1919.

== See also ==
- List of fossiliferous stratigraphic units in Ontario
