= Sextant Formation =

- Stratigraphic range: Devonian
- Type: Formation

Location
- Region: Ontario
- Country: Canada

The Sextant Formation is a geologic formation in Ontario. It preserves fossils dating back to the Devonian period.

== See also ==
- List of fossiliferous stratigraphic units in Ontario
