= Nottawasaga Group =

Geologic formation in Canada

- Stratigraphic range: Ordovician
- Type: Group

Location
- Region: Ontario
- Country: Canada

The Nottawasaga Group is a geologic group in Ontario. It preserves fossils dating back to the Ordovician period.

== See also ==
- List of fossiliferous stratigraphic units in Ontario
