= Missinaibi Formation =

Stratigraphic formation in Ontario

- Stratigraphic range: Late Pleistocene (Sangamonian); ~0.1–0.011 Ma
- Type: Formation

Location
- Coordinates: 50.8°N 81.3°W
- Approximate paleocoordinates: 50.8°N 81.3°W
- Region: Ontario
- Country: Canada
- Missinaibi Formation (Canada) Missinaibi Formation (Ontario)

The Missinaibi Formation is a Late Pleistocene geologic formation in the Hudson Bay Lowlands in Northern Ontario, Canada. The formation lies within Missinaibi Provincial Park.

It was first identified by geologists in the late 19th century. The Missinaibi Formation is principally known for having nonglacial sediments, which means that dating the formation has helped scientists track the ebb and flow of glacial activity in the region.

Scientists have found fish and beaver remains dating from the Sangamonian interglacial The formation also preserves fossils of mastodon.

In 1958, Algoma Ore Properties surveyors identified two iron ore deposits with an airborne magnetometer and staked mining claims.

== See also ==
- List of fossiliferous stratigraphic units in Ontario
