= Monticulipora =

Scientific classification
- Kingdom: Animalia
- Phylum: Bryozoa
- Class: Stenolaemata
- Order: †Trepostomatida
- Family: †Monticuliporidae
- Genus: †Monticulipora

Extinct genus of bryozoans

Monticulipora is an extinct genus of Ordovician bryozoans belonging to the family Monticuliporidae. It was first named in 1849, and its description was published the following year by French paleontologist Alcide M. d'Orbigny, making it one of the earliest bryozoans to be recognized in science. It is still one of the most widespread fossil bryozoan genera. Though colonies that grow in masses made of multiple layers are characteristic of the genus, its colonies have varying shapes, able to be encrusting, branching, massive, or frond-like, and are covered in monticules (bumps). Most Monticulipora species have distinctively granular walls, and Monticulipora and can be distinguished from Homotrypa by the presence of axial diaphragms.

== Species ==
- Monticulipora mammulata D'Orbigny, 1850
- Monticulipora irregularis Jimenez-Sanchez, 2015
- Monticulipora cystiphragmata Jimenez-Sanchez, 2010
- Monticulipora grandis Ulrich, 1866
