= Blue Mountain Formation =

Geological formation in Canada

- Stratigraphic range: Maysvillian
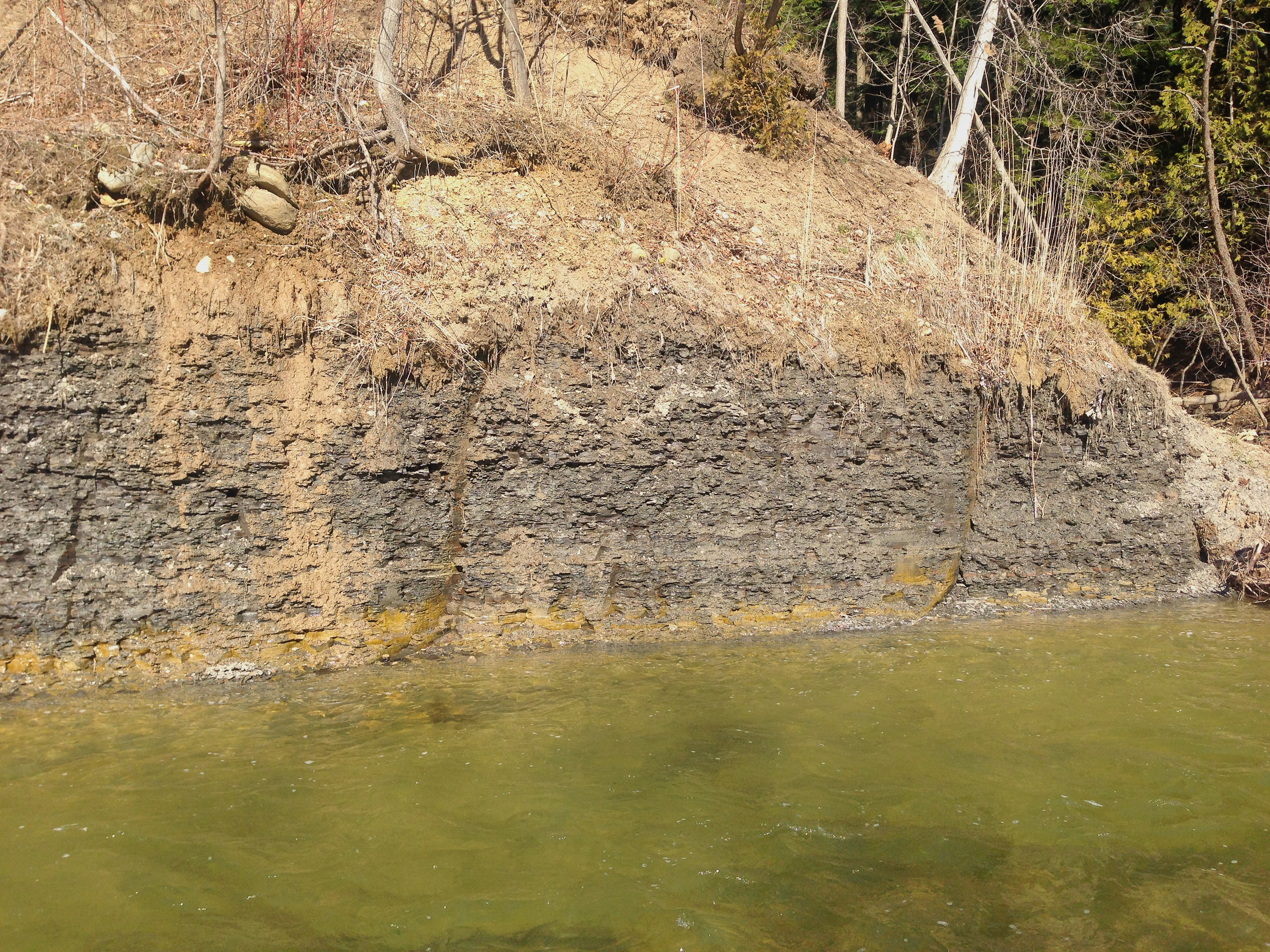
- Blue Mountain Formation outcropping along the Little Rouge Creek.
- Type: Geological formation
- Sub-units: Rouge River Member
- Underlies: Georgian Bay Formation
- Overlies: Lindsay Formation
- Thickness: Up to 76 metres (250 ft)

Lithology
- Primary: Shale
- Other: Limestone, siltstone

Location
- Region: Southern Ontario,
- Country: Canada

Type section
- Named for: Blue Mountain
- Named by: W. A. Parks
- Year defined: 1928

The Blue Mountain Formation (previously the Whitby Formation) is a geological formation of Upper Ordovician age (Maysvillian Stage), which outcrops in Ontario, Canada from Nottawasaga Bay southeastward to the Toronto area.
