= Gull River Formation =

- Stratigraphic range: Caradoc; ~460.9–449 Ma
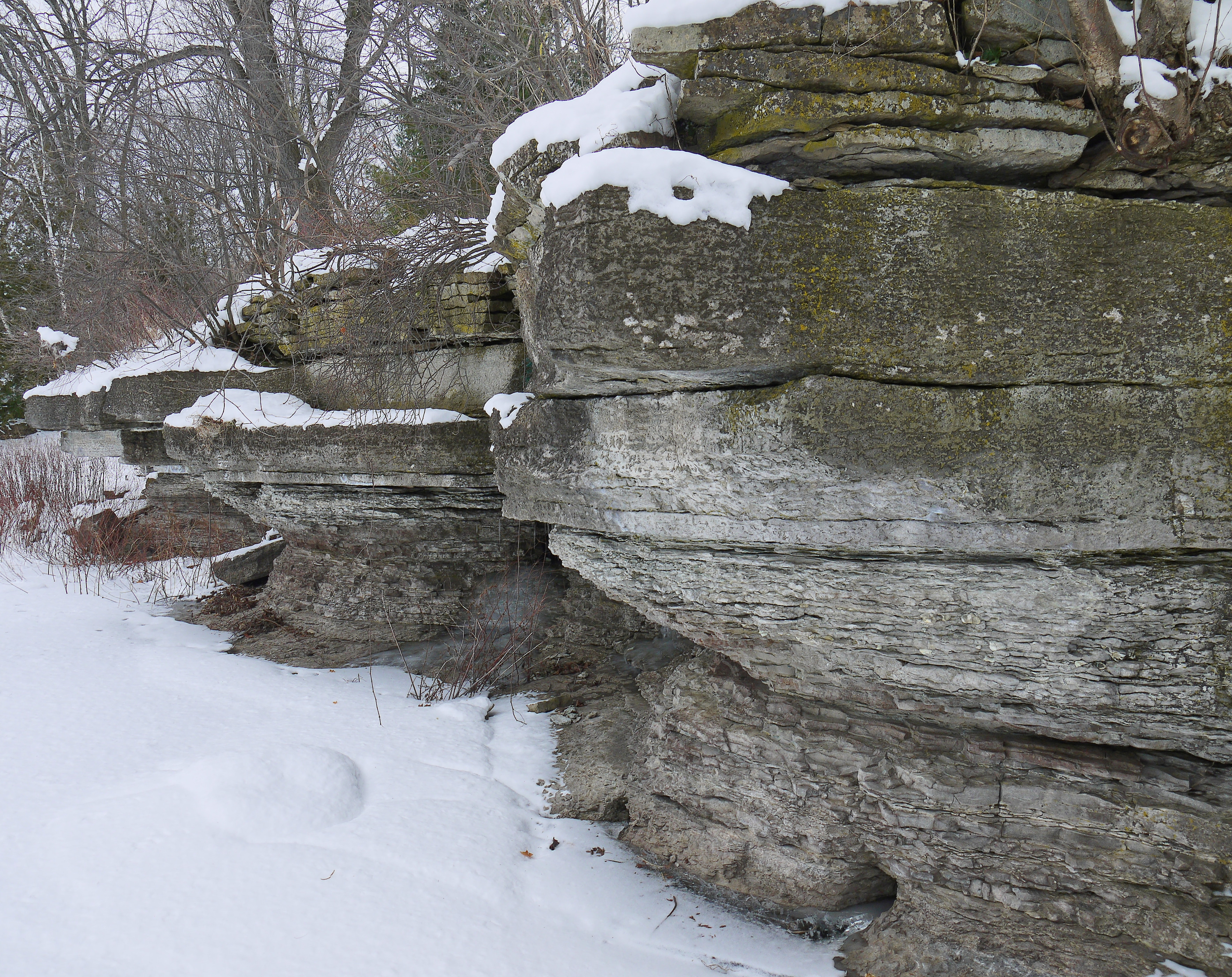
- Gull River Formation exposed along the shore of Lake St. John, Ramara
- Type: Formation
- Unit of: Simcoe Group; Black River Group
- Underlies: Bobcaygeon Formation; Coboconk Formation
- Overlies: Shadow Lake Formation

Lithology
- Primary: Limestone, dolomite
- Other: Shale, sandstone

Location
- Region: Ontario; New York; Pennsylvania
- Country: Canada; United States

Type section
- Named for: Gull River
- Named by: V. J. Okulitch
- Year defined: 1939

The Gull River Formation is a geological formation of Middle Ordovician age (Caradoc Stage), which outcrops in Ontario, Canada. Lithologically, the formation is dominated by light grey to brown limestones and greenish gray dolomites with thin shale and sandstone interlayers.

== Fossil content ==
=== Invertebrates ===
==== Chelicerates ====
Chelicerates reported from the Gull River Formation
Genus	Species	Presence	Material	Notes	Images
Lunataspis	L. borealis	Upper Member, Kingston, Ontario.	3 specimens (1 adult & 2 juveniles or subadults).	A horseshoe crab.	

=== Flora ===
==== Acritarchs ====
Acritarchs reported from the Gull River Formation
Genus	Species	Presence	Material	Notes	Images
Dicommopalla	D. rissae	Southern Ontario.		Also found in the Bobcaygeon Formation.	
