= Kwataboahegan Formation =

Geologic formation in Ontario

- Stratigraphic range: Devonian
- Type: Formation
- Underlies: Moose River Formation
- Overlies: Stooping River Formation

Location
- Region: Moose River Basin Hudson Bay Basin
- Country: Canada

Type section
- Named for: Kwataboahegan River

The Kwataboahegan Formation is a geologic formation in the Moose River and Hudson Bay basins in northern Ontario, containing fossils from the Lower to Middle Devonian period. It is characterized by brown bituminous stromatoporoid-coral floatstone to bindstone and stromatoporoid-coral-crinoid wackestone-packstone-rudstones, interbedded with light grey, bioclastic wackestone-packstone.

== See also ==
- List of fossiliferous stratigraphic units in Ontario
