= St. Paul Group =

Geologic group in West Virginia, United States

- Stratigraphic range: Ordovician
- Type: Formation
- Underlies: Black River Group
- Overlies: Beekmantown Dolomite

Location
- Region: West Virginia
- Country: United States

The St. Paul Group is a geologic group in West Virginia. It dates back to the Ordovician period.
