= Pamelia Formation =

Ontario geological formation

- Stratigraphic range: Late Ordovician
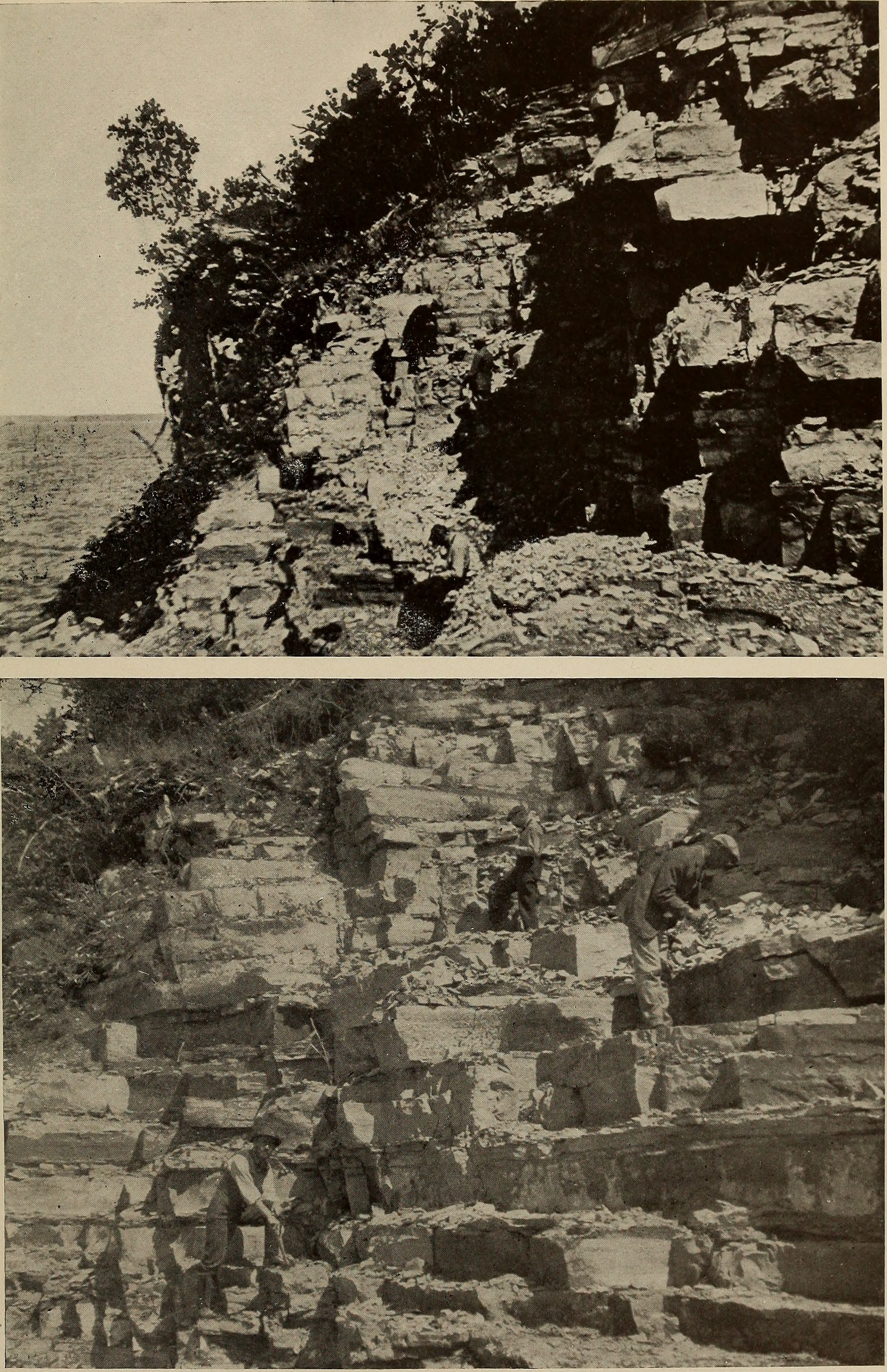
- Quarry in the upper Pamelia formation, by the river 4 miles west of Clayton. Photo (upper) by H. M. Ami and (lower) by E. O. Ulrich, 1908
- Type: Formation
- Unit of: Black River Group
- Underlies: Lowville Formation

Location
- Region: Ontario, Quebec, New York
- Country: Canada, USA

The Pamelia Formation is a geologic formation in Ontario, Quebec and New York. It dates back to the Late Ordovician period.
