= Farr Formation =

- Stratigraphic range: Ordovician
- Type: Formation

Location
- Region: Ontario
- Country: Canada

The Farr Formation is a geologic formation in Ontario. It preserves fossils dating back to the Ordovician period.

== See also ==
- List of fossiliferous stratigraphic units in Ontario
