= Cobourg Limestone =

Geologic formation in Ontario, Canada

Cobourg Formation
- Stratigraphic range: Ordovician
- Type: Formation

Location
- Region: Ontario
- Country: Canada

The Cobourg Formation is a geologic formation in Ontario. It preserves fossils dating back to the Ordovician period. Technically the formation extends into New York State with Canadian section called Lindsay Formation. The formation was named by Raymond (1921). The Cobourg formation was estimated to have a total thickness of about 70 m.

== Fossil found in the Cobourg Formation ==
- An example of a trilobite that lived during the Upper Ordovician, Flexicalymene croneisi. Found in 1941, in the Cobourg formation.

== See also ==
- Colborne quarry: a limestone near Lake Ontario and is located in the Cobourg Formation.
- List of fossiliferous stratigraphic units in Ontario
