= Prasopora =

Scientific classification
- Kingdom: Animalia
- Phylum: Bryozoa
- Class: Stenolaemata
- Order: †Trepostomatida
- Family: †Monticuliporidae
- Genus: †Prasopora; Nicholson and Etheridge, 1877

Extinct genus of bryozoans

Prasopora is an extinct genus of bryozoan belonging to the family Monticuliporidae, known from the Middle Ordovician. Its colonies were disc-shaped or hemispherical, flat on bottom and convex on top, and had very abundant mesopores; in the case of the species P. insularis its zooecia (individual tubes housing the zooids) were isolated from each other by the numerous mesopores surrounding them. It is very similar to the genus Monticulipora, and some bryozoan species have been assigned to both genera at different points in their study, but it is mostly distinguished by having more mesozooecia, rounder autozooecial apertures, relatively few acanthostyles and diaphragms and cystiphragms equally distributed in the autozooecia.

Study of the species Prasopora simulatrix has provided insight into the speciation rate of bryozoans, revealing that some bryozoans evolved relatively quickly, in contrast to an earlier view of bryozoans as slowly evolving.

== Species ==
- Prasopora carnica (Vinassa de Regny, 1915)
- Prasopora spjeldnaesi
- Prasopora fritzae (Fritz, 1957)
- Prasopora prismatica (Fritz, 1957)
- Prasopora similis (Fritz, 1957)
- Prasopora simulatrix (Ross, 1967)
- Prasopora fistuliporides (Vinassa de Regny, 1910)
- Prasopora thorali (Prantl, 1940)
- Prasopora insularis
