= Don Beds =

- Type: Formation

Location
- Region: Ontario
- Country: Canada

The Don Beds is a geologic formation in Ontario. It preserves fossils.

== See also ==
- List of fossiliferous stratigraphic units in Ontario
