= Monticuliporidae =

Scientific classification
- Kingdom: Animalia
- Phylum: Bryozoa
- Class: Stenolaemata
- Order: †Trepostomatida
- Suborder: †Amplexoporina
- Family: †Monticuliporidae; Nicholson, 1881

Extinct family of bryozoans

Monticuliporidae is a family of bryozoans belonging to the order Trepostomatida, characterized by branching, encrusting, or massive colonies with regularly spaced bumps on their surfaces. It is one of the earliest bryozoan families to arise, known from the early Ordovician period, but disappears from the fossil record after the late Silurian period. Monticuliporidae had a widespread geographical range and many genera had cosmopolitan distribution.

== Genera ==
- Homotrypa
- Mesotrypa
- Monticulipora
- Prasopora
