= Kettle Point Formation =

Devonian geologic formation in the Great Lakes region, Ontario, Canada

- Stratigraphic range: Late Devonian
- Type: Geological formation
- Underlies: Pleistocene glacial till or Mississippian Bedford Formation
- Overlies: Hamilton Group
- Thickness: average of 100 feet (30 m) to maximum of 360 feet (110 m) in drill holes

Lithology
- Primary: bituminous shales
- Other: shale and siltstone interbeds

Location
- Location: Kettle Point Park, Ontario
- Region: southern Ontario
- Country: Canada

Type section
- Named for: Kettle Point, Ontario
- Named by: J. F. Caley
- Location: Kettle Point Park, Ontario
- Year defined: 1943
- Coordinates: 43°10′59.41″N 82°1′3.11″W
- Region: Southeast shore of Lake Huron
- Country: Ontario, Canada
- Thickness at type section: 12 feet (3.7 m) exposed along shoreline

The Kettle Point Formation, also known as the Kettle Point (black) Shale, is a geologic formation that consists of thinly laminated, siliciclastic, organic-rich black shale with thin to thick interbeds of organic-poor mudstone. It is largely restricted to the subsurface of southwestern Ontario.

The eponymous type location of the Kettle Point Formation is Kettle Point which is located on the southeast shore of Lake Huron, southwestern Ontario. Kettle Point is the sole significant, and relatively accessible, outcrop of this formation. The outcrop consists of a wave-cut bluff which is 6.5 feet (2.0 m) high. Along its length, the wave-cut bluff exposes 12 feet (3.7 m) of slightly tilted shale. Kettle Point was named for decimetre- to meter-sized, hemispherical to spheroidal authigenic carbonate concretions that erode out of the Kettle Point Formation. These concretions are locally called kettles due to their resemblance to cooking vessels used by European settlers.

== Nomenclature ==
In 1863, Logan first informally described the strata comprising the Kettle Point Formation as the Kettle Point black shale and its outcrop at Kettle Point. In 1900, Dadly described the shales and concretions, locally called kettles, and their outcrop at Kettle Point in detail. His descriptions of them have been used and cited by later researchers. Caley first formally named and defined the Kettle Point beds in 1943. Later in 1955, Sanford and Brady redefined it to include only those beds that occur between the top of the Hamilton Formation and the base of the Port Lambton beds. Further detailed descriptions of this unit were published by MacDonald and Russell.

== Lithology ==
The Kettle Point Formation of consists of organic-rich laminated black shale interbedded with beds of organic-poor greyish green mudstones and rare red and red–beige mudstones. The black shales of the Kettle Point Formation are organic-rich and highly fissile. Some layer of black shale are interlaminated with white-coloured laminae of clay- to silt-sized quartz and calcite grains. The associated greyish green mudstones are homogeneous, lacking discernible lamination or other primary sedimentary structures. Furthermore, they lack the organic matter and microfossils, i.e. Tasmanites , which are abundant in the black shale. The beds of greyish green mudstones occur interbedded with beds of black shale. Thin, < 4 in (10 cm) (average 0.8–1.2 in (2.0–3.0 cm)), beds of red and red–beige mudstone were observed in three drill holes of the Kettle Point Formation. The homogeneous red and red–beige mudstones are significantly lower in mud content than the greyish green mudstones and have a microcrystalline appearance. The reddish color is due to small siderite crystals that are less than 0.4 in (10 mm) in diameter.

The concretions that are found within the Kettle Point Formation are typically spheres to oblate spheroids. The oblate spheroids are flattened slightly parallel to the plane of bedding. The diameters of these concretions range from 1–1.5 feet (0.30–0.46 m). The fragments of these concretions display internal fabric that consists of an inner homogeneous, commonly burrowed zone surrounded by an outer zone of radiating fibrous carbonate. These concretions lack any obvious nuclei, such as macrofossils, at their centers. These concretions occur in the black shale in the lower part of the Kettle Point Formation. Because the concretions are so much harder than the enclosing weakly indurated shale, they readily weather out of the shale along the shoreline and are incorporated into the rubble mantling the lake bottom adjacent to the outcrop.

== Contacts ==
The lower contact of the Kettle Point Formation is a disconformity that lies on the uneven surface of the underlying Hamilton Group. The uneven topography of the basal contact is the result of a combination of the dissolution of the underlying Silurian Salina Salt and erosion of the underlying Hamilton Group. At Kettle Point, the black shales of the Kettle Point Formation rest directly upon a layer of "conodont hash", which in turn rest upon a 8.3 in (21 cm)-thick bed of chert. This cherts lies upon chert intercalated with limestone of the Hamilton Group.

The upper contact of the Kettle Point Formation is an erosional unconformity. Typically in southern Ontario, it is directly overlain by Pleistocene glacial tills and related deposits. In the central part of southern Ontario, the Carboniferous Bedford Formation of the Port Lambton Group unconformably rests upon Kettle Point Formation. Locally, sandstone-filled fluvial channels of the Berea Formation have removed the Bedford Formation and cut into the Kettle Point Formation.

== Fossils ==
Except for Tasmanites and conodonts, the flora and fauna of the Kettle Point Formation is very limited in terms of diversity as well as in number. Within the Kettle Point Formation, only Tasmanites, an orange or amber colored cyst of a marine planktonic alga, is abundant on typical bedding planes and within concretions. Conodonts are also common and less commonly ostracods, scolecodonts, arenaceous foraminiferans, and pyritized radiolarians and sponge spicules have also been observed. Rare megafossils include plant remains (e.g. Callixylon and Protosalvinia), the inarticulate brachiopod, Lingula, and fish remains (scales, dermal plates, and possible teeth). Small, unidentified, highly fragmented brachiopods and crinoids have been recovered from drill cuttings. Finally, well-preserved, silicified fossils of Prototaxites have been observed and collected from the black shales of the Kettle Point Formation at Kettle Point.

== Age and Correlation ==
The analysis of conodonts concluded that the strata comprising the Kettle Point Formation range in age from Frasnian and Famennian (Late Devonian). These conodonts faunas are also interpreted to indicate that the Kettle Point Formation is stratigraphically equivalent to more extensive organic-rich, fine-grained strata, e.g. the Ohio, New Albany, Chattanooga, and Antrim shales, of the eastern United States. It is also considered to be stratigraphically equivalent to organic-rich, fine-grained strata, the Long Rapids Formation, of the Hudson Bay platform in northern Ontario.

== See also ==
- List of fossiliferous stratigraphic units in Ontario
