= Dyer Bay Formation =

Geologic formation in Ontario, Canada

- Stratigraphic range: Silurian
- Type: Formation

Location
- Region: Ontario
- Country: Canada

The Dyer Bay Formation is a geologic formation in Ontario. It preserves fossils dating back to the Silurian period.

== See also ==
- List of fossiliferous stratigraphic units in Ontario
