= Georgian Bay Formation =

Geologic formation in the United States and Canada

- Stratigraphic range: Upper Ordovician (upper Maysvillian-lower Richmondian)
- Type: Formation
- Underlies: Queenston Formation; Manitoulin Formation
- Overlies: Blue Mountain Formation

Location
- Region: Michigan, Ontario
- Country: United States, Canada

The Georgian Bay Formation is a geologic formation in Michigan and Ontario. It preserves fossils dating back to the Ordovician period. The type locality of the formation is on East Meaford Creek (previously called Workman Creek), south shore of Nottawasaga Bay, Georgian Bay.

== Description ==
The formation consists of massive shale interbedded with siltstone/sandstone and limestone, with sub-horizontal bedding planes and widely spaced jointing.

== Fossil content ==
Color key: Taxon / Reclassified taxon / Taxon falsely reported as present / Dubious taxon or junior synonym / Ichnotaxon / Ootaxon / Morphotaxon	Notes; Uncertain or tentative taxa are in small text; ~~crossed out~~ taxa are discredited.

=== Ichnotaxa ===
Ichnotaxa
Genus	Species	Presence	Material	Notes	Images
Paleodictyon	P. isp. A	Southern Ontario.	2 specimens, ROM 49424 and ROM 49624.		
Paleodictyon	?P. isp. B	Southern Ontario.	1 specimen: ROM 49625.		
Planolites	P. constriannulatus	Southern Ontario.			

=== Vertebrates ===
Conodonts
Genus	Species	Presence	Material	Notes	Images
Amorphognathus	A. ordovicicus	Lower part of the formation.		Also found in the Blue Mountain Formation.	
Aphelognathus	A. grandis	Uppermost lower and upper members.			
Aphelognathus	A. politus	Lower part of the formation.		Also found in the Blue Mountain Formation.	
Aphelognathus	A. pyramidlis	Upper member.			
Belodina	B. confluens	Lower member at southern Georgian Bay.			
Coelocerondontus	C. trigonius	Lower part and Upper member of the formation.			
Decoriconus	D. fragilis	Upper member, Kagawong West Quarry.			
Drepanoistodus	D. suberectus	Lower part, uppermost lower and upper members of the formation.		Also found in the Blue Mountain Formation.	
Gen. et. sp. indet. 1		Upper member.			
Gen. et. sp. indet. 2		Upper member, Kagawong West Quarry.			
Gen. et. sp. indet. 3		Upper member, Kagawong West Quarry.			
Icriodella	I. prominens	Upper member, Kagawong West Quarry.			
Icriodella	I. superba	Lower part of the formation.			
Oulodus	O. robustus	Upper and lower members.			
Oulodus	O. ulrichi	Upper member.			
Oulodus	O. undulatus	Upper member.			
Ozarkodina	O. aff. O. hassi	Upper member, Kagawong West Quarry.			
Panderodus	P. gracilis	Lower part and upper member of the formation.			
Panderodus	P. aff. P. gracilis	Uppermost lower and upper members.			
Panderodus	P. staufferi	Lower part and upper member of the formation.			
Paroistodus	P. mutatus	Lower part of the formation.		Also found in the Blue Mountain Formation.	
Periodon	P. grandis	Lower part of the formation.		Also found in the Blue Mountain Formation.	
Phragmodus	P. undatus	Lower part and upper member of the formation.		Also found in the Blue Mountain Formation.	
Plectodina	P. inclinata	Upper member at southern Georgian Bay.			
Plectodina	P. tenuis	Lower part and upper member of the formation.			
Pseudobelodina	P. inclinata	Upper member, Manitoulin Island.			
Pseudobelodina	P. cf. P. kirki	Upper member, Manitoulin Island.			
Pseudobelodina	P. microdentata	Manitoulin Island.			
Pseudobelodina	P. quadrata	Upper member,Manitoulin Island.			
Pseudobelodina	P. vulgaris vulgaris	Upper member,Manitoulin Island.			
Pseudooneotodus	P. beckmanni	Upper member, Kagawong West Quarry.			
Rhipidognathus	R. symmetricus	Upper part of the formation.			
Staufferella	S. falcata	Lower member at southern Georgian Bay.			
Walliserodus	W. curvatus	Upper member, Kagawong West Quarry.			
Zanclodus	Z. sp.	Upper member.			

=== Invertebrates ===
Arthropods
Genus	Species	Presence	Material	Notes	Images
Orcanopterus	O. manitoulinensis	Kangawong Submember, Manitoulin Island.		A eurypterid.	

Brachiopods
Genus	Species	Presence	Material	Notes	Images
Kinnella	K. laurentiana	Lower Kagawong Submember.		An orthide.	

Other animals
Genus	Species	Presence	Material	Notes	Images
Curviconophorus	C. andersoni			Scleritomous metazoan.	

== See also ==
- List of fossiliferous stratigraphic units in Michigan
