= Mesotrypa =

Scientific classification
- Kingdom: Animalia
- Phylum: Bryozoa
- Class: Stenolaemata
- Order: †Trepostomatida
- Family: †Monticuliporidae
- Genus: †Mesotrypa; Ulrich, 1893

Extinct genus of bryozoans

Mesotrypa is a genus of bryozoans known from the Ordovician period, first described in 1893. Its colonies consist of low masses, wider than they are thick, made of superimposed layers, with small monticules on the surface of the colony.
