= Fossil Hill Formation =

Geological formation in Ontario

- Stratigraphic range: Silurian
- Type: Formation
- Area: Manitoulin Island, Bruce Peninsula, Niagara escarpment
- Thickness: Maximum 30 metres

Location
- Region: Ontario
- Country: Canada

The Fossil Hill Formation is a geological formation in Ontario, Canada. It preserves fossils dating back to the Silurian period.

== See also ==
- List of fossiliferous stratigraphic units in Ontario
