= Homotrypa =

Scientific classification
- Kingdom: Animalia
- Phylum: Bryozoa
- Class: Stenolaemata
- Order: †Trepostomatida
- Family: †Monticuliporidae
- Genus: †Homotrypa; Ulrich, 1882

Extinct genus of bryozoans

Homotrypa is an extinct genus of bryozoans from the Ordovician and Silurian periods, known from fossils found in the United States. Its colonies are branch-like and have small monticules made of groups of three or four larger zooecia slightly protruding out from the main surface of the colony. In cross section, the zooecia (tubes housing individual zooids) are erect in axis and gently curve toward the surface of the colony.

== Species ==
- Homotrypa curvata (Ulrich, 1882)
- Homotrypa niagarensis (Ernst, Brett and Wilson, 2019)
- Homotrypa anticostiensis (Bassler, 1928)
- Homotrypa ramulosa (Bassler, 1903)
