= Deicke and Millbrig bentonite layers =

Geological formations in North America

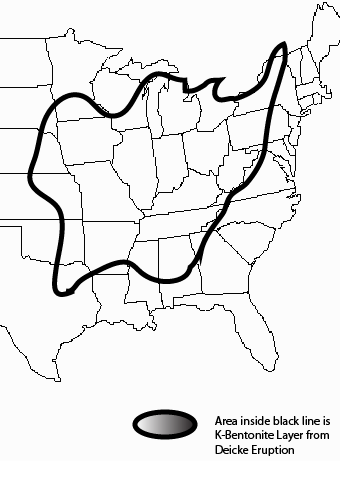
The mapped area of the Deicke K-bentonite layer in the United States

The Deicke and Millbrig bentonite layers, specifically the potassium bentonite layer, K-bentonite, were formed from a volcanic eruption during the Taconic orogeny during the Late Ordovician on Laurentia, the craton of North America. Researchers are very interested in the eruptions that formed these bentonite layers because they are thought to be some of the largest volcanic eruptions in the last 600 million years of Earth history, and the resulting ash layer for each eruption individually was greater in volume than the Toba eruption.

Bentonite is a type of clay that is formed from the weathering of volcanic ash deposits. Some researchers suggested that the ashes were from a volcanic arc that was on a convergent crust boundary. Researchers believe this because the trace element geochemistry of the bentonite shows that its source was a felsic calc-alkalic magmatic source, which is characteristic of volcanism from a continental crust destructive plate margin setting.

== Origins ==
The volcanoes that caused the eruptions are said to be from a magmatic arc on continental crust in a convergent tectonic system. The Taconic orogeny occurred when North America collided with either an island arc or microcontinent. Also according to researchers a few statements can be made about the eruptions produced from this system:

1. Due to widespread ash deposits it can be inferred that there was more pyroclastic air fall debris than pyroclastic flow. A pyroclastic flow deposit would be much more localized to the eruption source.
2. The large scale and dispersion of the ash tells researchers that the eruptions must have been very large and also have occurred in a convergent tectonic setting. Researchers believe this because the trace element geochemistry of the bentonite shows that its source was a felsic calc-alkalic magmatic source. This type of source is characteristic of volcanism from a continental crust destructive plate margin setting.
3. The eruptions probably began with a Plinian or ultra-Plinian phase that produced a crystal-rich ash as a coignimbrite, air fall deposit
4. The sequence of events is part of the normal sequence for volcanic eruptions in which ignimbrite is generated.
5. In the area where the maximum bentonite thickness and grain size is recorded there is no evidence of nearby vent deposits, this means that these locations are at a minimum of several kilometers away from the volcano vents.

The volcanic eruption that produced the Deicke K-bentonite bed which has been dated to 457.1 ±1.0, which was calculated using a concordant uranium-lead dating zircon fraction. The Deicke and Millbrig eruptions have a minimal estimation of 600,000 km^{2} (230,000 sq mi) covered and at least 1,122 km^{3} (269 cu mi) of pre-compaction bentonite that was accumulated over North America. Some researchers believe that these eruptions could have caused a global cooling event, lowering the Earth's surface temperature several degrees. Other researchers did not find enough data to support the claim of significant cooling based on their sample location.

== Field areas ==
There are many different areas where current field work is being done on the Deicke and Millbrig bentonite layers. Due to the large expanse of these layers in the geologic record outcrops can be found all over the country. Some researchers have worked in field areas in Dickeyville, Wisconsin; Guttenberg, Iowa; Bloody Run, Iowa; Decorah, Iowa; Locust, Iowa; Spring Grove, Minnesota; Sugar Creek, Minnesota; and Rochester, Minnesota. These locations are listed from the southeast (Dickeyville) to the northwest (Rochester). The area sampled also is dominantly shale in the southeast and changes to a carbonate dominated outcrops in the northwest. Also some researchers work predominately in the Appalachians. Samples can be gathered from as far south as Birmingham, Alabama to Roanoke, Virginia and extending further north.

== Stratigraphy ==
The Deicke and Millbrig bentonite layers lie in the Decorah Formation, which is primarily composed of shale and carbonate rocks. The two bentonite layers are also separated by layers of shale and carbonate rocks. These layers in-between the units change as the units are correlated. In some areas the rock units between the bentonite layers are primarily shale and in those areas the carbonate rocks found normally are much thinner in thickness and are shalier than they are in other areas where this stratigraphic sequence is found. Moreover, in other field areas the shale layer between the Deicke and Millbrig Bentonite layers is thinner and the carbonate rocks like wackestone are much more predominant.

== Bentonite layers ==
Several different types of bentonite can be found; however, potassium bentonite is the main one associated with the Deicke and Millbrig eruptions. The Deicke and Millbrig K-bentonite layers can be found from Alabama to New York to Minnesota. These K-bentonite layers are up to a meter thick in some locations. Such thickness is unique. Most bentonite layers are very thin (only a few centimeters thick). Localities where the bentonite thickness and grain size are at their maximum are most likely close to the eruption sites.

== Trace element concentrations ==
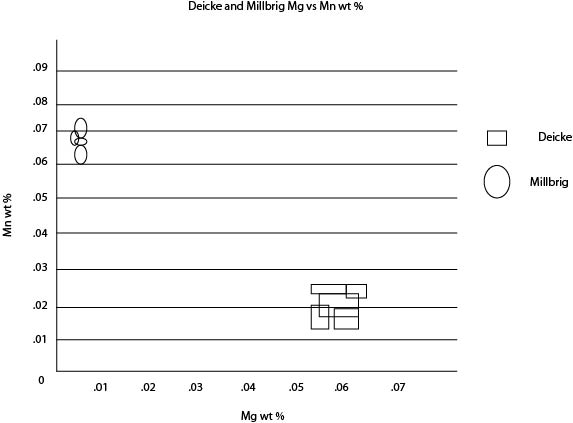
Graph showing the cluster of data, with a ± 2 σ uncertainty, from the electron microprobe analysis of apatite crystals found in the Deicke and Millbrig bentonite layers

The Deicke and Millbrig bentonite layers can also be correlated due to certain elemental concentrations found in mineral inside of the bentonite layers. One such mineral that is useful is apatite. In one study done by Emerson et al. 2004, they compared the percent weight concentrations of manganese and magnesium in the mineral to differentiate between the two layers at different outcrops. For analysis of apatite for the Deicke bentonite layer, they collected 36 grains from two different locations and used electron microprobe analysis. Researchers found that there is a manganese weight percent of 0.02 and a magnesium weight percent 0.058. There were no significant differences found between the different localities. For the Millbrig bentonite layer, researchers found that there is a manganese weight percent of 0.064 and a magnesium weight percent 0.013. For the Millbrig bentonite, there were also no significant differences between localities. The data that was collected had a ± 2 σ uncertainty. Using this information, current researchers can use similar methods to find the manganese and magnesium weight percentages and, depending on the data, can correlate the bentonite layers they find and identify them as either the Deicke or Millbrig bentonites.

== Effect on flora and fauna ==
While these bentonite layers are massive and spread across most of the eastern United States there is no evidence found of an extinction event in the geologic record. Based on data taken by Huff et al. 1992 from graptolite, acritarch, chitinozoan, conodont, and shelly fossils, there was no irregular extinction event found. Having no extinction event in this case is odd due to the large size of the ash fall.

== Current research efforts ==
Many scientists are working to see if this massive eruption caused a global cooling event. Some scientists are working with conodonts from the rock units surrounding the bentonite layers to see if there is a shift in the rare-earth element concentrations. If there is a shift in the concentration of certain elements, then that could potentially correlate to a shift from a tropical marine system to a cold marine system. Also sample localities could affect these concentrations, so it is crucial that researchers gather samples from all over the country where the bentonite beds have been confirmed to be from the Deicke eruption.
