= Black River Group =

Geologic group in Eastern and Midwestern, USA

- Stratigraphic range: Middle Ordovician to Late Ordovician; Whiterockian-Mohawkian; ~460–450 Ma
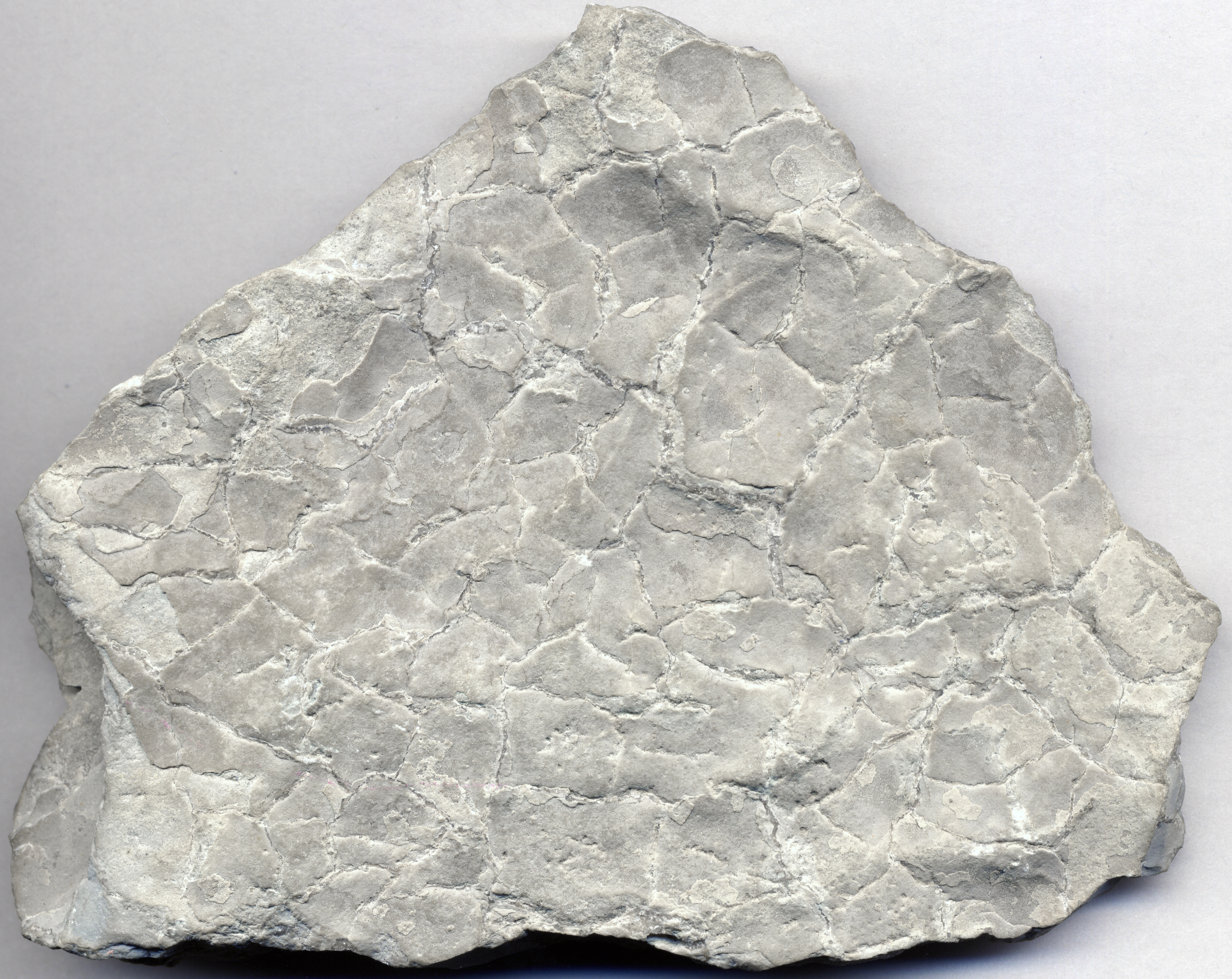
- Mudcracked limestone (Tyrone Limestone, Black River Group, Late Ordovician; Frankfort, Kentucky)
- Type: Group
- Sub-units: Coboconk Formation; Deicke and Millbrig bentonite layers Gull River Formation; Hatter Formation (PA); Isle La Motte Limestone (NY, VT); Linden Hall Limestone (PA); Pamelia Formation (NY); Pecatonica Formation (IN); Peery Limestone (VA, WV); Plattin Formation (IN); Selby Limestone (NY); Snyder Limestone (PA, VA, WV); Ward Cove Limestone (VA, WV); Wardell Formation (VA, WV); Witten Limestone (VA, WV); Shadow Lake Formation. New York Amsterdam Limestone Waterton Limestone Lowville Formation
- Underlies: Lexington Limestone and Trenton Group
- Overlies: St. Paul Group and Wells Creek Formation

Lithology
- Primary: Limestone
- Other: Dolomite, Mudstone

Location
- Region: Indiana, Kentucky, Michigan, New York, Ohio, Pennsylvania, Tennessee, West Virginia, Ontario, Quebec
- Country: United States, Canada

The Black River Group is a geologic group that covers three sedimentary basins in the Eastern and Midwestern United States. These include the Appalachian Basin, Illinois Basin and the Michigan Basin. It dates back to the Late Ordovician period. It is roughly equivalent to the Platteville Group in Illinois. In Kentucky and Tennessee it is also known as the High Bridge Group. In areas where this Geologic Unit thins it is also called the Black River Formation (undifferentiated). One example of this is over the Cincinnati Arch and Findley Arch. Large parts of the Black River have been dolomized (where the parent limestone CaCO_{3} has been turned into dolomite CaMg(CO_{3})_{2.}) This happed when there was interaction of hot saline brine and the limestone. This created hydrothermal dolomites that in some areas serve as petroleum reservoirs.

== Description ==
The Black River Group is characterized by carbonates, primarily limestone. Some dolostones can be found in localized areas. Due to fracturing and porosity naturally occurring with in the formation it servers as a gas reservoir throughout its reach. It also serves as an oil reservoir in Michigan and North West Ohio.

== Stratigraphy ==
The Black River Group is predominantly composed of carbonates. In addition clay minerals may be found in differing amounts. Locally sand and silt may be found in thin horizons especially in the eastern reaches of the unit. In addition there are K-bentonite beds. These were formed as a result of volcanic eruptions depositing layers of volcanic ash. The Black River Group was deposited during a time when large parts of North America were a passive cratonic margin. North America at the time was near the equator and was a tropical environment. Large parts of what is now North America were covered by the Iapetus Ocean. The Black River Group was formed during a time of transition time where Laurentia was subject to the beginnings of the Taconic Orogeny. During the Cambrian the Iapetus began to slowly close. As Laurentia moved towards an island arc that it would eventually collide with the crust folded downward. As this happened the carbonate deposition of the continental shelf gradually gave way to clastic deposits of a deep marine environment. As a result, there are more siliceous deposits to the east. The Taconic Orogeny occurred to the east and this formed a basin, but further west the crust buckled up into an arch. The result was the Cincinnati Arch. This arch was eroded back to late Ordovician-aged rock. This split the basin of the Iapetus Ocean into three separate basins.

== Subunits ==
=== Black River Formation ===
The Black River Formation is a geologic formation in Quebec, Canada and Michigan, United States. It preserves fossils dating back to the Ordovician period.

=== New York State ===
==== Amsterdam Limestone ====
The Amsterdam Limestone is a geologic formation in New York. It dates back to the Ordovician period. It is a unit of the Black River Group in Eastern New York.

===== Fossils =====
Cartersoceras noveboracense

==== Waterton Limestone ====
The Waterton Limestone is a geologic formation in New York. It dates back to the Ordovician period. It is a unit of the Black River Group in Eastern New York.

==== Lowville Formation ====
The Lowville Formation is a geologic formation in New York and Ontario. It preserves fossils dating back to the Ordovician period.

== Energy production ==
The Black River Group acts as a reservoir for natural gas and petroleum. The reservoirs are associated with dolostones and. Gas and oil fields can be found in New York, Pennsylvania, Ohio, Indiana, Kentucky, Michigan, and Tennessee.

== See also ==
- List of fossiliferous stratigraphic units in Quebec
- List of fossiliferous stratigraphic units in Michigan
