= Trenton Group =

Widespread shallow marine limestone

- Stratigraphic range: Middle-Upper Ordovician; ~470–443.8 Ma
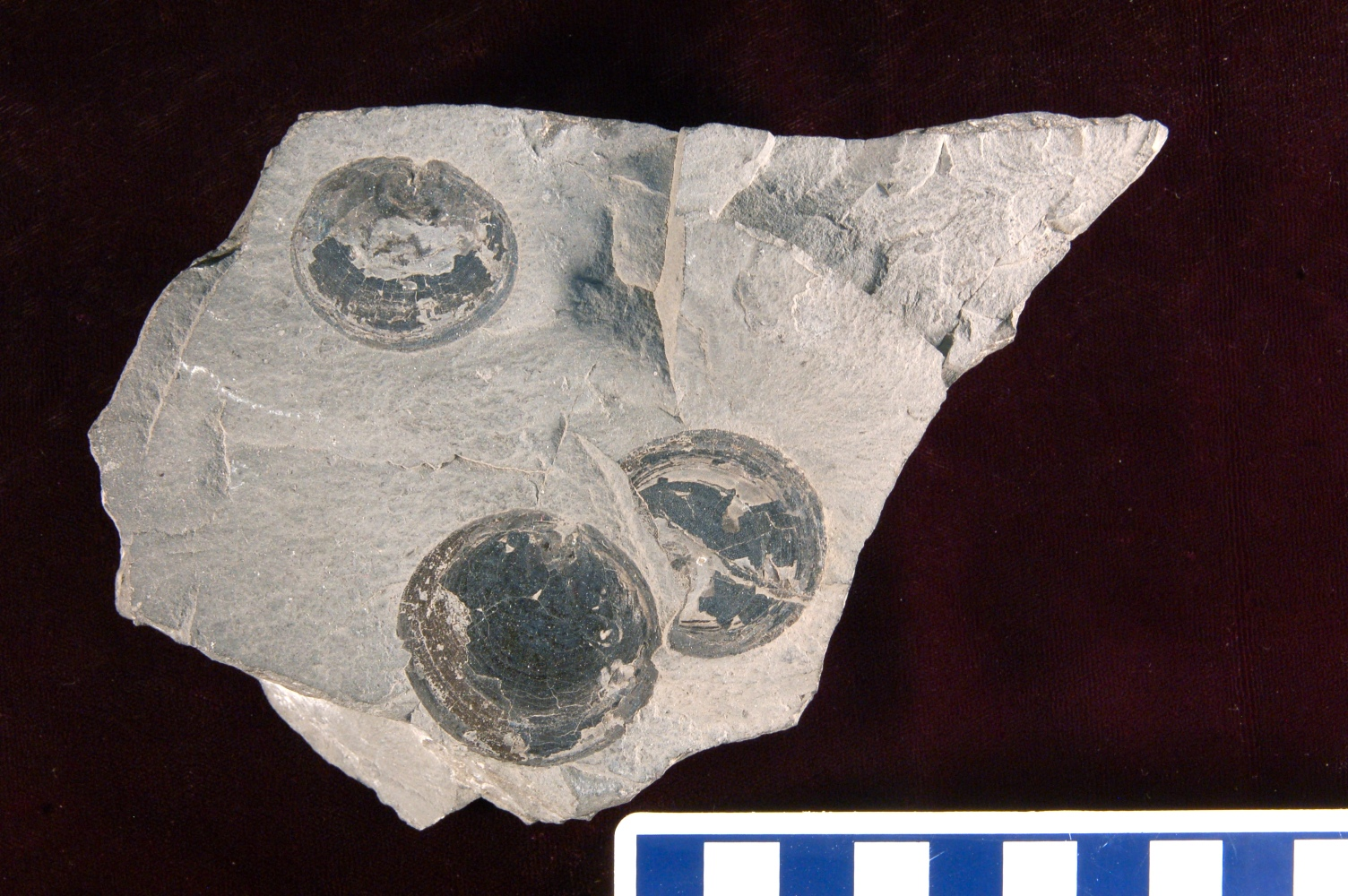
- Lingulae in Trenton Group limestone from Canada
- Type: Group
- Sub-units: Hillier Limestone, Dolgeville Limestone; Steuben Limestone; Denley Limestone; Sugar River Limestone; Glens Falls Limestone; Kings Falls Limestone; Napanee Limestone; Neuville Formation; Selby Limestone
- Underlies: Medina Group
- Overlies: Black River & Plattin Formation

Lithology
- Primary: Limestone
- Other: Chert

Location
- Region: Indiana, Michigan, Ohio, Pennsylvania, Virginia, West Virginia, Ontario
- Country: United States, Canada
- Extent: Appalachia, Midwestern and Southeastern United States

Type section
- Named for: Trenton Falls, New York
- Named by: Lardner Vanuxem in 1838

The Trenton Group or Trenton Limestone is a geologic group in Kentucky, Michigan, Ohio, New York, Indiana, Pennsylvania, West Virginia, and Ontario. It dates back to the Ordovician period and is primarily composed of limestone. The Trenton Limestone has served as a gas field in several states.

== Stratigraphy ==
In the Illinois Basin, Michigan Basin and Cincinnati Arch the Trenton Limestone is classified as a geological formation rather than a group.

In the Appalachian Basin the Trenton Group is broken down into formations and members.

=== Glens Falls Limestone ===
The Glens Falls Limestone contains thin fossiliferous beds. The inclusion of ripple marks indicates this formation was deposited in a shallow marine environment. The Glens Falls contains two members, the upper member is the Shoreham and the lower Larrabee Member. The upper member contains more clay and silica where the lower member contains more carbonate material. Both are named for separate quarries located in Vermont

=== Napanee Limestone ===
The Napanee is a thin bedded deep water limestone. The formation is composed of thin interbedded wackestone and shale. This formation can be organic rich in parts and sub surface is dark grey to blackish, while at surface it will weather to a tan or buff color. Fossils can be abundant including bryozoans, brachiopods, crinoids, trilobites, and other mollusks. Dalmanella rogata is rather common.

=== Selby Limestone ===
The Selby is primarily composed of a nodular dark grey packstone and grainstone with bioclast inclusions. It is massively bedded. In outcrops found in New York the Selby is about ten feet thick. The Selby and the Watertown Formation below, mark a change from the back reef facies of the Black River Group to an off shore ramp. Fossils found within the Selby include corals, orthocones, various types of brachiopods, stromatoporoids green algae, including Receptaculites and a small amount of crinoids. Located at the base of the Selby the Hounsfield Metabentonite Bed, part of the Deicke and Millbrig bentonite layers. The Selby demonstrates the characters of a shallow off shore ramp generally slopping to the east. The biota indicates a shallow water environment. The grains in the rock tend to be course grained in size indicating wave winnowing. That is a coastal process where wave processes removes fine grained material, like silt and clay, leaving behind courser material. The Selby is found in north western New York and southeast Ontario and pinches out to the south and east in the Black River Valley.

== See also ==
- Trenton Gas Field
- Indiana gas boom
- Petroleum industry in Ohio
