= Lindsay Formation =

Geologic formation in Ontario

- Stratigraphic range: Trentonian to Maysvillian
- Type: Formation

Lithology
- Primary: Limestone
- Other: Shale

Location
- Region: Ontario
- Country: Canada

Type section
- Named for: Lindsay
- Named by: D. F. Hewitt
- Year defined: 1960

The Lindsay Formation is a geologic formation in Ontario. It preserves fossils dating back to the Ordovician period.

== See also ==
- List of fossiliferous stratigraphic units in Ontario
