= Bedford Shale =

Geological formation in the United States

- Stratigraphic range: Late Famennian
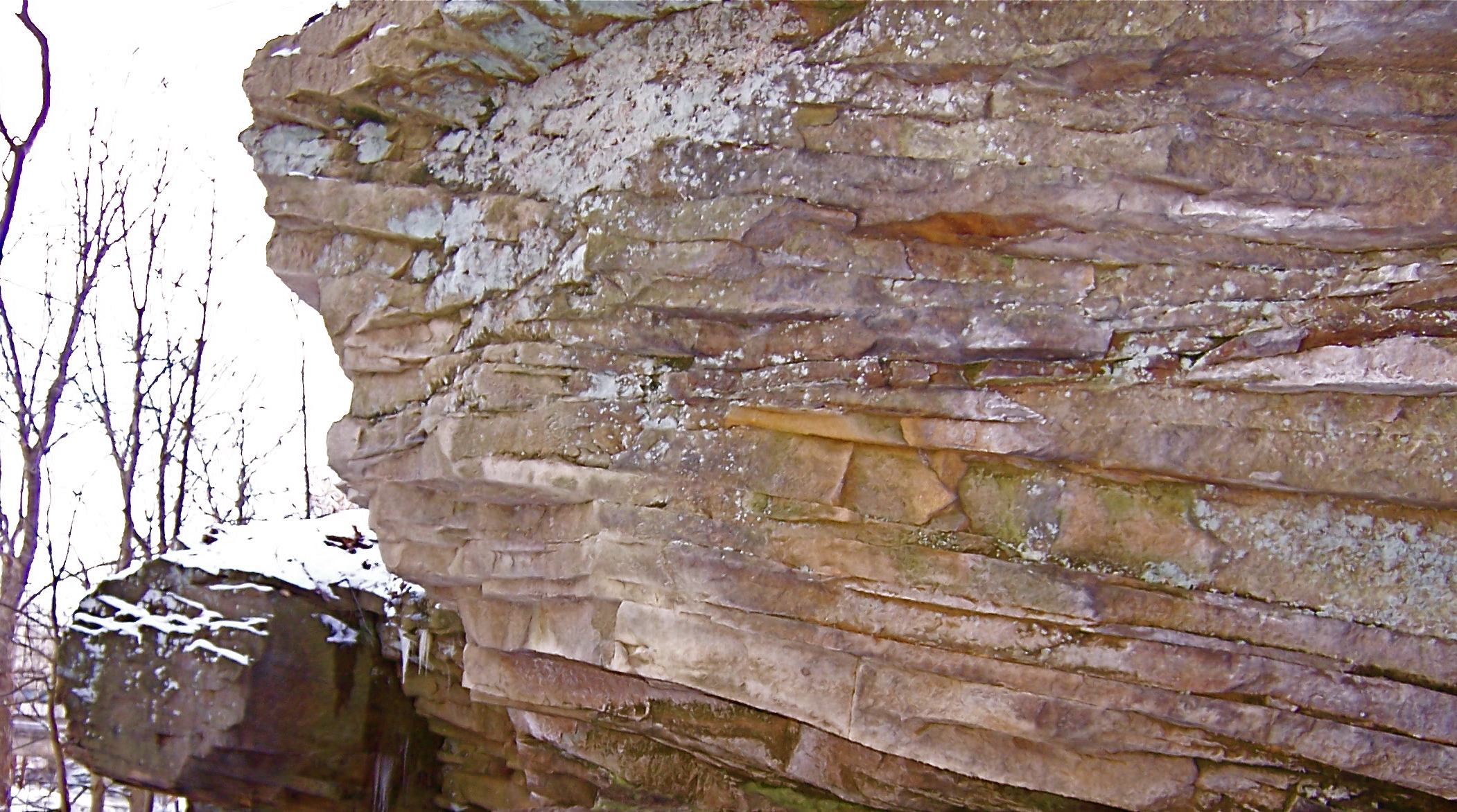
- Bedford Shale at Brandywine Falls on Brandywine Creek near Boston Heights, Ohio
- Type: Formation
- Unit of: Waverly Group
- Underlies: Berea Sandstone
- Overlies: Cussewago Sandstone, Cleveland Shale, and Ohio Shale

Location
- Country: United States

Type section
- Named for: Bedford, Ohio, U.S.

The Bedford Shale is a shale geologic formation in the states of Ohio, Michigan, Pennsylvania, Kentucky, West Virginia, and Virginia in the United States.

== Identification and name ==
John Strong Newberry, director of the Ohio State Geological Survey, first identified the formation in 1870. He called it the "Bedford Shale" and designated its type locality at Tinkers Creek near Bedford, Ohio.

Details of the type locality and of stratigraphic nomenclature for this unit as used by the U.S. Geological Survey are available on-line at the National Geologic Map Database.

The Bedford Shale in northern Ohio is a red, predominantly soft clay shale that grades to grayish-black near its base. Siltstone beds, showing ripples and some as much as 3 inches (7.6 cm) thick, are interbedded near the bottom. This red Bedford Shale consists mostly of sandstone and siltstone, and is much more argillaceous from mid-state Franklin County north-northeast to Lorain County on Lake Erie. (Note: This red sandstone and siltstone has occasional small areas of bluish-gray shale.) Proceeding east from Lorain County, the silt content increases. The Bedford undergoes a marked lithologic change at the Cuyahoga River. It becomes equal parts red and gray shale, and the basal 12 feet (3.7 m) becomes a hard siltstone (the Euclid member, or Euclid siltstone). At Tinkers Creek in Bedford, Ohio, there is no red shale; instead there is about 85 feet (26 m) of gray and bluish-gray shale, nodules of light-gray mudstone, and brownish-gray to gray irregular beds of siltstone. East of the Grand River, the clay shale is largely replaced by silty gray shale, hard silty gray mudstone, and thin platy gray siltstone.

The red shale fades in intensity and thickness toward the south. South of Columbus, the color fades to reddish-brown and exists only as a bed a few feet thick between bluish or bluish-gray Bedford Shale. The Bedford in southern Ohio is almost completely a bluish-gray shale. Proceeding south from Ross and Pike counties, the Bedford turns from a soft clay shale to a gray silty shale interbedded with thin beds of gray siltstone in its upper parts. In Ross, Pike, and Scioto counties, siltstone in the Bedford increases so much that it becomes mostly siltstone interbedded with silty shale.

Generally, the red Bedford thins and grades into the gray Bedford all along its margin. Along the rough line from Huron to Lawrence counties, beds of mudrock may be found.

Throughout Ohio, a few thin layers of siltstone may be found in all types of Bedford Shale. These are calcareous and 2 to 4 inches (5.1 to 10.2 cm) thick in central Ohio. Siltstone beds increase in number and thickness in the upper part of the Bedford shale south of Columbus. In southern Ross County, the upper third of the Bedford contains a large number of layers of thin, platy siltstone as well as occasional thin layers consisting of blebs of calcium carbonate, marcasite, and pyrite. Oscillation ripple marks can be seen on the upper surfaces of these siltstones. Silty laminae become common toward the bottom of the Bedford Shale throughout the state, as do thin beds of gray silty mudstone (a fine-grained type of mudrock).

"Flow rolls" are a structure which appears unique to the Bedford Shale. These structures appear in the basal part of the formation. In a flow roll, the rock is greatly deformed and rolled into a cylindrical shape.

The Bedford Shale of Michigan is a light gray or bluish-light gray in color. (Note: Although red Bedford Shale, like that found extensively in Ohio, is found in Michigan, it is extremely uncommon.) It is a silty shale, siltier and sandier in its upper part. The boundary with the Berea Sandstone exhibits thin veins ("stringers") of sandstone, indicating erosion of the Bedford Shale which was filled in later by sand.

The Bedford Shale appears gray or greenish-gray in Kentucky, and contains sparse to abundant thin beds of siltstone, calcareous concretions, and nodules of pyrite. Limited areas of red Bedford Shale can be found in Boyd County. Siltstone and sandstone beds are particularly common from Lewis and Greenup counties southeast to Pike County; here, the Bedford is referred to as the "Berea sand". (Note: Sandstone beds in the Bedford Shale in Kentucky are mostly made of orthoquartzite, a sandstone composed of usually well-rounded quartz grains cemented by silica and containing few trace minerals.)

== Geographic Extent ==
The Bedford Shale is a shale geologic formation in the states of Ohio, Michigan, Pennsylvania, West Virginia, Ohio, and Virginia in the United States.

=== Ohio ===
Map showing general location of the Bedford Shale in Ohio, northeastern Kentucky, and western Pennsylvania.

The Bedford Shale in Ohio has been extensively studied since 1943, and the 1954 study by Pepper, de Witt, and Demarest was still considered the classic study of the formation as late as 1991.

The Bedford Shale is present throughout much of Ohio. Outcrops extend along Lake Erie from the Ohio-Pennsylvania border west to Lorain County. It runs in a generally southern direction to Lawrence County in the south. (Note: This "line" is broad and irregular, and Bedford Shale may be found as far west as Pickaway County.) The southern border of Ohio along the Ohio River defines its southernmost boundary in the state. In eastern Meigs County, the boundary turns north and runs to north-central Athens County before turning northeast to run through western Washington County into Monroe County. It runs north through the center of Belmont and Jefferson counties, and in southern Columbiana County turns east to pass into Pennsylvania.

On average, the Bedford Shale in Ohio is 85 feet (26 m) to 95 feet (29 m) thick, reaching its maximum thickness between Huron and Lawrence counties. The shale is about 150 feet (46 m) thick along its central ridge between Lorain and Licking counties. In northern Ohio, the thickness of the Bedford is irregular due to erosion prior to the deposit of the Berea Sandstone, and due to recent glacial and stream erosion. The Bedford thins toward the south; near Columbus in central Ohio it is 95 feet (29 m) thick, and 85 feet (26 m) near Chillicothe 45 miles (72 km) to the south. It thins to the east as well, reaching 85 feet (26 m) near Bedford and 45 feet (14 m) in southwestern Ashtabula County.

Outcrops of the Bedford shale may be found throughout Cuyahoga, Lake, and Geauga counties in cliffs beneath the Berea sandstone. Outcrops are much fewer in Lorain County (west of Cuyahoga County). The Bedford appears only in deep valleys (such as those of rivers and large streams). The red shale weathers so swiftly into a sticky red mud that even these outcrops are usually covered by soil. South of the counties bordering Lake Erie, outcrops are usually covered by glacial drift. Occasional outcrops can be seen along streams that flow south into the Ohio River, particularly at Big Walnut Creek.

=== Michigan ===
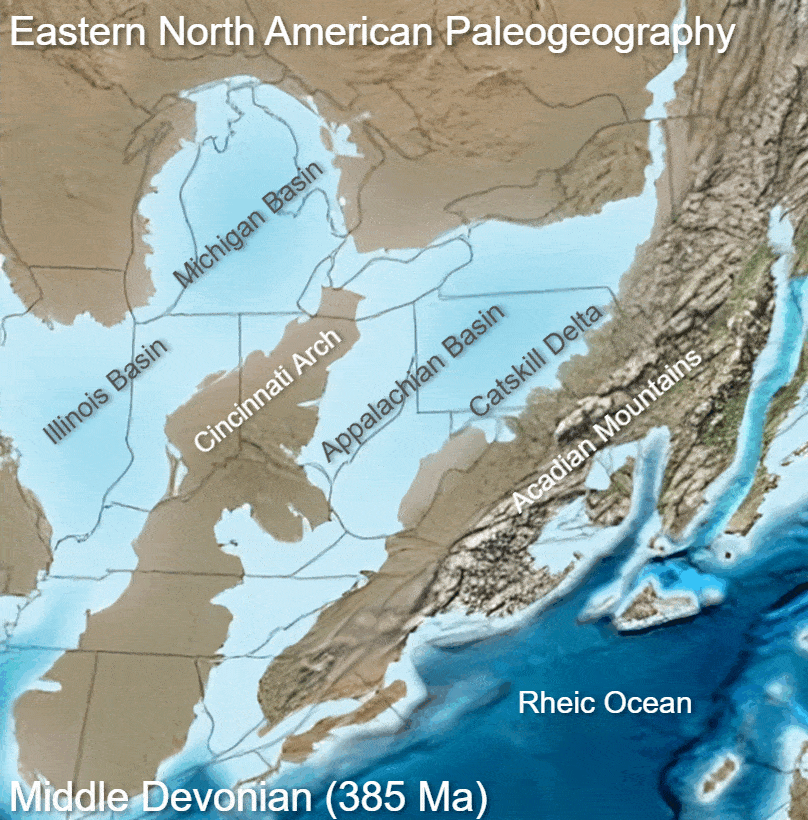
Eastern North America in the Middle Devonian, showing the Michigan Basin of the Rheic Ocean.

In Michigan, the Bedford Shale is found in the southeast along shores of Lake Erie and Lake St. Clair; along the shore of Lake Huron north of Saginaw Bay; along the south shore of the Straits of Mackinac; north of 44 degrees latitude along the shore of Lake Michigan; and in the far southwest corner of the state. The Bedford Shale was first identified in Michigan in 1876 in the southeastern part of the state. Some sources say the shale is 50 to 100 feet (15 to 30 m) thick while others say it is generally about 60 feet (18 m) thick. It is almost 250 feet (76 m) thick in The Thumb of Michigan, and about 65 feet (20 m) thick in Southeast Michigan. (Note: The Bedford Shale grades so gradually into the Berea Sandstone that estimates of the Bedford's thickness are difficult to make.) The Bedford Shale becomes finer-grained and thins from Lake Erie/Lake St. Clair to the west, pinching out to extinction near the center of the Michigan Basin and merging with the upper part of the Ellsworth Shale. In south-central Michigan, the Bedford Shale grades into and intertongues with the Antrim Shale.

There are no known outcrops of the Bedford Shale in Michigan, as it and the rocks above it are covered by Pleistocene glacial drift.

=== Kentucky ===
The Bedford Shale is present throughout much of eastern Kentucky. It is thickest in north (in Lewis County), thinning out to extinction in Bath, Estill, and Pike counties (Note: A mere tongue of the Bedford Shale extends into the New Albany Shale near Olympia in Bath County.) as it proceeds south and west. It is about 100 feet (30 m) thick in Letcher and Pike counties, which were closest to the Famennian deltas being deposited from the east and southeast. The Bedford Shale essentially forms a great wedge underground, with the narrow edge in the southwest.

The Bedford Shale in Kentucky is covered in thin soil and heavily weathered sandstone blocks. Outcrops of the rock may be seen along the Pine Mountain ridge in Harlan County. In Kentucky, a transition zone ranging from a few inches to 4.2 feet (1.3 m) in thickness occasionally appears as the basal member of the Bedford Shale.

=== Pennsylvania ===
Bedford Shale is found in Crawford County, Pennsylvania, where it is also known as "Hayfield limestone". It is extremely lenticular and highly localized, and gray to bluish-gray in color. It is frequently interbedded with ripple marked siltstone, and contains a few thin siliceous limestone layers. It overlays the Cussewago Sandstone and is overlain by the Berea Sandstone. The Bedford is 44 feet (13 m) feet at Littles Corners in Hayfield Township, and decreases to 22 feet (6.7 m) thick 8 miles (13 km) northwest of Meadville. It thins rapidly and loses its identity around Meadville, where it grades into the Shellhammer Hollow Formation. Fucoids in the shale can be seen on Stratton Creek.

=== West Virginia ===
The Bedford Shale has also been traced into West Virginia. It may be found in the subsurface along the Ohio River in Mason, Cabell, Wayne, and Mingo counties. Its edge cannot be readily determined, as the Bedford's gray shale and interbedded siltstones overlay extremely similar Early Famennian rocks. However, the Bedford Shale appears to pinch out in southern Mingo County. The Bedford Shale may exist in northern West Virginia, but had not been identified there as of 1979.

=== Virginia ===
Bedford Shale has also been identified in the Dickenson-Buchanan county area in southwestern Virginia.

== Stratigraphic Setting ==
The Bedford Shale is the basal member of the Waverly Group, which (in ascending order) includes the Bedford Shale, Berea Sandstone, Sunbury Shale, Cuyahoga Formation, Logan Formation, and the Maxville Limestone.

Generally, the Bedford Shale in Ohio is underlain by the Cleveland Shale throughout most of Ohio, although it is underlain by the Chagrin Shale in the east. The boundary with the Cleveland Shale is usually clear. However, a transition zone, ranging from a few inches to 4.2 feet (1.3 m) in thickness, occasionally appears. The transition zone is missing along most of the western edge of the red Bedford Shale in northern Ohio, and only at a few places are thin stringers of black shale found in the basal part of the Bedford. Above the transition layer, there is usually about 15 feet (4.6 m) of gray shale. This represents the basal part of the Bedford Shale. This gray shale thickens significantly east of Cuyahoga River, and to the south as the red shale pinches out. It is difficult to impossible to visually determine the boundary with the Chagrin Shale due to its lithologic similarity with the Bedford. In eastern Ashtabula and Trumbull counties, the Bedford overlays the Cussewago Sandstone.

The Bedford Shale is generally overlaid by the Berea Sandstone throughout Ohio. The contact between the two is generally clear but extremely irregular. Pre-Berea and Berean erosion eroded significant portions of the red Bedford Shale in northern Ohio. For example, near Berea, Ohio, 85-foot (26 m) deep channels were scoured into the Bedford Shale. Sand filled these channels, and became Berea Sandstone. To the southwest, in Huron County, these channels cut down to the Cleveland Shale. Along Ohio's eastern border, in Columbiana, Mahoning, and Trumbull counties, erosion has almost completely removed the Bedford Shale. Erosional channeling becomes less marked toward the south-central Ohio. Near Columbus, the channels are only about 5 feet (1.5 m) deep, and they disappear south of Lithopolis (which is 7 miles (11 km) southeast of Columbus). In southern Ohio, the Bedford and Berea grade into one another so gradually that the boundary between them cannot be distinguished visually.

The Bedford Shale in Michigan is generally overlaid by the Berea Sandstone. The upper part of Bedford in this state is silty and sandy, making the boundary between it and the Berea sandstone nearly impossible to identify visually. The boundary may be determined by gamma ray logging, however. In eastern Michigan, the Bedford Shale overlays the Antrim Shale. Toward the center of the Michigan Basin, the Bedford overlays the Ellsworth Shale. The boundary between the two becomes increasingly difficult to identify as one proceeds west, as the Bedford merges laterally into the upper 97 feet (30 m) of the Ellsworth Shale.

In the vicinity of Irvine (Michigan), the black shale of the Sunbury comes in contact with the black shale of the Ohio shale as a result of the feathering out of the Berea and Bedford strata.

Generally, the Bedford Shale in Kentucky is underlain by the Ohio Shale and overlaid by the Berea Sandstone. The Bedford Shale's upper and lower contacts are usually sharp in the state, but complicated by intense deformation. In much of eastern Kentucky, the Bedford Shale and Berea Sandstone intertongue (interlock). Near Vanceburg, the upper 40 feet (12 m) of the Bedford Shale is silty shale that comes between the Bedford and Berea siltstone. Only 4 miles (6.4 km) to the east near Garrison, Bedford is almost completely siltstone. Just 18 miles (29 km) south, near Petersville, the Bedford has almost no siltstone layer. There are only a few thin siltstone beds present, and the Bedford grades almost imperceptibly into the Berea—both of which are composed of bluish-gray to gray clay shales and some gray silty shale. In southern Lewis County, there is no Bedford siltstone; the upper portion of the Bedford is a noticeably soft bluish-gray shale. Near Olympia in Bath County, the Berea Sandstone is not found and the Sunbury Shale overlies the Bedford, while near Irvine in Estill County to the south both the Berea and Bedford are missing and the Sunbury lies atop the Ohio Shale.

== Fossils ==
Except for its lowest strata, the Bedford Shale is largely fossil-free. In central and north-central Ohio, the Bedford Shale contains extensive fossils in the first few feet of its bottommost part. These include brachiopods like Lingula, Orbiculoidea, and the large Syringothyris bedfordensis; molluscs, particularly bivalves; and Devonian fish. South of Ross County, most of the siltstones in the Bedford Shale show fucoids (casts of Fucales, a common littoral seaweed).

The basal 1 to 5 feet (0.30 to 1.52 m) of the Bedford Shale in Michigan contains extensive fossils of the Famennian stage. Small amounts of natural gas have been recovered from the shale as well.

In Kentucky, a transition zone ranging from a few inches to 4.2 feet (1.3 m) in thickness occasionally appears as the basal member of the Bedford Shale in Kentucky. Invertebrate fossils are found at the top of this transition zone in northeast Kentucky.

== Age ==
Although there have been conflicting reports in the past, the most recent evidence is that the rock was laid down very late in the Famennian stage of the Devonian period. This makes the rock about 365 to 358.9 million years old. The age of the Bedford Shale has seen significantly different interpretations over time. Some geologists have placed it exclusively in the upper Devonian while others have concluded it is exclusively lower Carboniferous. Still others have placed the Devonian-Carboniferous boundary in the basal few inches or feet of the Bedford Shale. Depending on the source, the rock began to be laid down either 360 million years ago or 365 million years ago. and finished being laid down at the end of the Famennian 358.9 million years ago. (Note: Dating the end of the Famennian stage is difficult. Estimates of the end of many stages and periods, including the Famennian, can be off by anywhere from 0.5 percent to 1 percent (that is, two to three million years), and estimates of the end of the Famennian "have experienced worryingly large changes in the past decades".)

In their 1991 review of the literature, geologists Raymond C. Gutschick and Charles A. Sandberg point out that the Bedford Shale is correctly assigned to the upper Devonian. The 1975 Devonian-Carboniferous Boundary Working Group of the International Union of Geological Sciences engaged in an extensive study of brachiopod, conodont, and spore fossils in the Bedford Shale and Berea Sandstone, and found no evidence of lower Mississippian conodonts in either rock formation. The American definition of the Devonian period was realigned to match the definition already in use in Europe, which led to the placement of both formations in the Famennian stage of the upper Devonian.

== Interpretation of Depositional Environment ==
The Bedford Shale was laid down by several river deltas. One delta laid down this rock formation in Michigan's Thumb peninsula. Several small deltas deposited Bedford Shale in Kentucky. A particularly large delta, known as the Red Bedford Delta, laid down a red-colored wedge of the shale in central Ohio.

The climate of the late Famennian was mild, and much plant life grew along streams and rivers. There was abundant precipitation, and monsoons swept the area from west to east.

During the Famennian stage of the late Devonian period, the Rheic Ocean covered much of what is now Kentucky, Michigan, and Ohio in the United States. This sea became extremely cloudy and turned anoxic (oxygen-poor) during the Hangenberg event, a global extinction that marked the end of the Devonian period and which deposited large amounts of erosion sediment and organic material into the sea. After the Hangenberg event ended, the waters of the Rheic Ocean began to clear and oxygenate again. The end of the Hangenberg event coincided with the end of the Acadian orogeny, a highly active period of mountain-building that began in the middle Devonian and created the Acadian Mountains which covered the Mid-Atlantic region, New England, and the Canadian Maritimes. As sea levels fell, the Canadian Shield and the Acadian Mountains began to erode. Material from these areas created river deltas that pushed south and west into the sea, creating the Bedford Shale and Berea Sandstone. (Note: The Bedford Shale and Berea Sandstone were likely created by what is known as shelf-edge or shelf-margin deltas. These types of deltaic deposits form in deep water on the edge of a continental shelf. They are created due to high sediment coming from upstream as well as dropping sea levels. Shelf-margin deltas can be tens of miles wide and hundreds of miles deep.)

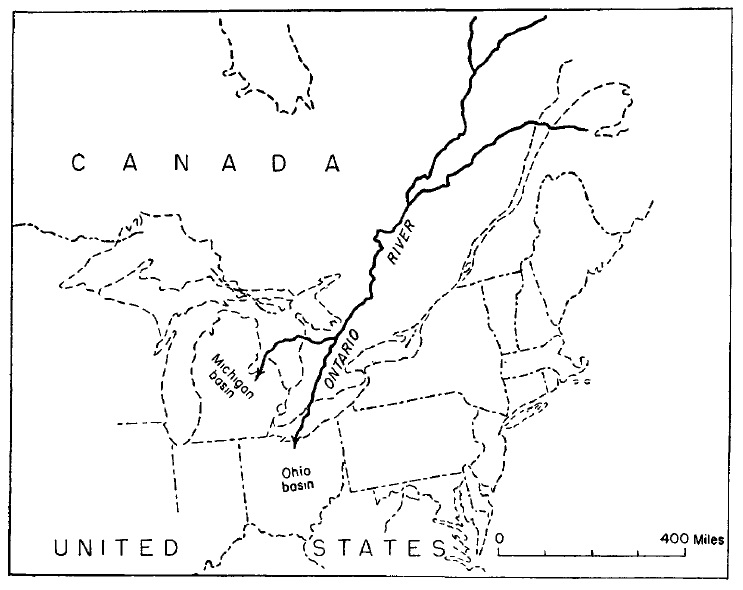
A sketch map of the paleo Ontario River system

The Ohio Bay of the Rheic Ocean covered most of Kentucky, Michigan, Ohio, and western Pennsylvania, Virginia, and West Virginia. At the start of the period during which the Bedford Shale began to be laid, muddy waters of the bay began to clear. The land adjacent to the north and east rose, furnishing coarser detrital material. Stronger currents stirred up the mud, which mixed with the coarse sediment and became the basal part of the Bedford Shale. The stronger current oxygenated the water, and small mollusks and fish repopulated the bay. Greater amounts of sediment flowing into the bay made it inhospitable for life again. The shallow sea kept rising, reaching its maximum depth when about half the Bedford Shale had been deposited. The sea rose and fell repeatedly while the remainder of the Bedford was deposited. (Note: Cushing, Leverett and Van Horn concluded that the sea rose and fell, but that it was equally possible that the sea continued to rise. De Witt and McGrew, writing nearly 50 years later, concluded that the Ohio Bay rose throughout the creation of the Bedford Shale.)

The ancient Ontario River probably entered the Ohio Bay about Lorain County, depositing red sediment which originated in the eastern part of the Canadian Shield. This created the Red Bedford Delta which deposited the sediment that became the red Bedford Shale of north-central and northeast Ohio. In time, the Red Bedford Delta extended about 210 miles (340 km) south into the Ohio Bay, nearly dividing it. The pre-erosion delta was roughly 75 miles (121 km) wide at its northern end, 60 miles (97 km) wide in the middle, and about 20 miles (32 km) wide at its southern end. Two lobes, each about 5 to 6 miles (8.0 to 9.7 km) wide, extended from the southern tip. Oscillation ripple marks in the siltstone of the Bedford Shale's gray basal part shows that this sediment was deposited under water. (Note: It is possible that the red color was present in the original sediment, but changed to gray due to the interaction with other minerals present in the seawater.) These ripple marks are not present in the red Bedford Shale, indicating it was deposited subaerially. There is also a well-documented system of about 100 miles (160 km) of ancient braided and meandering water channels in Ashland, Holmes, and Knox counties, indicating where the distributary network of the river sought to reach the sea.

The Cincinnati Arch and its branches, the Findlay Arch and the Kankakee Arch, probably prevented the red sediment from reaching westward. This vast arc of rock, which extends from western Alabama and northern Mississippi northeast to north-central Ohio, was probably a low-lying island near Cincinnati, Ohio, when the Bedford Shale first began to be laid down. It not only rose over the next several million years, it accreted sediment to it—perhaps extending almost to the northern shore of the Ohio Bay.

The ancient Gay-Fink River, Cabin Creek River, and Virginia-Carolinas River also formed large deltas in the eastern part of the Ohio Bay, contributing gray sedimentary material to the Bedford Shale from what is now Virginia, North Carolina, and South Carolina. As much as one-fifth of the total area of the Bedford Shale was created from these deltas.

A number of sandbars, collectively known as the Channel Sands, existed on either side of what later became the Red Bedford Delta. These irregularly shaped bodies continue to exist within the Bedford Shale. One such narrow, sinuous, branching body exists in a 40-mile (64 km) line from Richland County south to Hocking County. Smaller sand bodies exist in Ames Township in Athens County, Reading Township in Perry County, and a few other places. These sand bodies all lie beneath the red shale, indicating they were laid down early in the Bedford Shale's depositional history.

Two large siltstone lentils were created during the deposition of the Bedford Shale, the northern Sagamore and the southern Euclid. The Sagamore, which has a maximum thickness of 20 feet (6.1 m), is found on Sagamore Creek in southeastern Cuyahoga County, and is in the lower third of the Bedford Shale. The Euclid, which has a maximum thickness of 30 feet (9.1 m), extends from Independence, Ohio northeast to Willoughby, Ohio, and is part of the most basal member of the Bedford Shale.

An extremely large sandstone lens is the Second Berea. Located in Athens, Gallia, Meigs, Morgan, and Muskingum counties, this sandstone body is 80 miles (130 km) long and 6 to 10 miles (9.7 to 16.1 km) wide. Originally known as the "stray gas sand", it was originally a large sandbar east of what became the Red Bedford Delta. It is equivalent in age to the Euclid siltstone. About 30 feet (9.1 m) of gray Bedford Shale overlays the Second Berea.

As in other states, the Bedford Shale in Michigan was deposited by deltas. Relatively coarse clastic material eroded from the Canadian Shield was carried by the ancient Ontario River System south into the Michigan Basin of the Rheic Ocean. There, the sediment was deposited to the south and west by the Thumb Delta, a large delta which at that time covered The Thumb of Michigan. There is good evidence to suggest that Bedford Shale in Michigan was not laid down contemporaneously with the red Bedford Shale in Ohio, and most likely came shortly after. Although the Michigan Basin and the Appalachian Basin were connected, later tectonic uplift created the Findlay Arch. As younger rock atop the arch eroded, a 50-mile (80 km) gap was created between the Bedford Shale of Ohio and the Bedford Shale of Michigan.

As in other states, the Bedford Shale in Kentucky was formed by deltas. The shale exhibits cross-bedding and erosional channels filled with Berea Sandstone, both of which indicate that the Rheic Sea was shallow. Three ancient rivers—the Gay-Fink, the Cabin Creek, and the Virginia-Carolina—probably deposited most of the sediment, which consisted of detrital rock and organic matter from the Acadian Mountains flowing westward and southward into the shallow sea covering the Appalachian Basin. Evidence for a westerly and southwesterly flow of water comes from channels eroded in the shale and filled with sandstone. These lobes extend southwest, indicating the direction of the flow of water. Ripple marks in the Bedford Shale in Kentucky form in a northwest–southeast line, indicating a steady wind coming from the northeast.

== Economic Resources ==
Native Americans used heavily weathered Bedford Shale for its reddish pigment. Colonial French traders named Vermillion River after the Bedford's red shale. Weathered Bedford Shale was also used in the 1800s and early 1900s to make face brick (a brick used on exterior surfaces to present a clean appearance) and tile.

== Bibliography ==
- Boenigk, Jens; Wodniok, Sabina; Glücksman, Edvard (2016). Biodiversity and Earth History. Berlin: Springer-Verlag. ISBN 9783662516416.
- Bose, Rituparna; Bartholomew, Alexander J. (2013). Macroevolution in Deep Time. New York: Springer-Verlag. ISBN 9781461464754.
- Cohee, George C. (1979). "Michigan Basin Region". In Craig, Lawrence C.; Connor, Carol Waite (eds.). Paleotectonic Investigations of the Mississippian System in the United States. Part I. Introduction and Regional Analyses of the Mississippian System. Washington, D.C.: U.S. Government Printing Office.
- Collins, Horace R. (1979). "Ohio". The Mississippian and Pennsylvanian (Carboniferous) Systems in the United States. Geological Survey Professional Paper 1110-E. Washington, D.C.: U.S. Government Printing Office.
- Conkin, James Elvin; Conkin, Barbara M.; Lipchinsky, Larry Z. (1980). Devonian Black Shale in the Eastern United States. University of Louisville Studies in Paleontology and Stratigraphy No. 12. Louisville, Ky.: University of Louisville.
- Cushing, H.P.; Leverett, Frank; Van Horn, Frank R. (1931). Geology and Mineral Resources of the Cleveland District, Ohio. Geological Survey Bulletin 818 (PDF) (Report). Washington, D.C.: U.S. Government Printing Office.
- de Witt, Wallace Jr.; McGrew, Laura W. (1979). "The Appalachian Basin Region". In Craig, Lawrence C.; Connor, Carol Waite (eds.). Paleotectonic Investigations of the Mississippian System in the United States. Part I. Introduction and Regional Analyses of the Mississippian System. Washington, D.C.: U.S. Government Printing Office.
- Dick, Jeffrey C.; Shakoor, Abdul (1995). "Characterizing Durability of Mudrocks for Slope Stability Purposes". In Haneberg, William C.; Anderson, Scott A. (eds.). Clay and Shale Slope Sustainability. Boulder, Colo.: Geological Society of America. ISBN 9780813741109.
- Dyni, John R. (2009). "Origin and Resources of World Oil Shale Deposits". In Gao, Jinsheng (ed.). Coal, Oil Shale, Natural Bitumen, Heavy Oil and Peat. Volume II. Oxford, U.K.: Eolss Publishers. ISBN 9781848264670.
- Edmunds, William E.; Berg, Thomas M.; Sevon, William D.; Piotrowski, Robert C.; Heyman, Louis; Rickard, Lawrence V. (1979). "Pennsylvania and New York". The Mississippian and Pennsylvanian (Carboniferous) Systems in the United States. Geological Survey Professional Paper 1110-B. Washington, D.C.: U.S. Government Printing Office.
- Ells, Garland D. (1979). "Michigan". The Mississippian and Pennsylvanian (Carboniferous) Systems in the United States. Geological Survey Professional Paper 1110-J. Washington, D.C.: U.S. Government Printing Office.
- Ettensohn, Frank R.; Fulton, Linda Provo; Kepferle, Royo C. (1977). "Use of the Scintillometer and Gamma-Ray Logs for Correlation From the Subsurface to the Surface In Black Shale". In Schott, Garry L.; Overbey, William K. Jr.; Hunt, Arlen E.; Komar, Charles A. (eds.). Proceedings, First Eastern Gas Shales Symposium (Report). Morgantown, W.Va.: Morgantown Energy Research Center.
- Frazier, William J.; Schwimmer, David R. (1987). Regional Stratigraphy of North America. New York: Plenum Press. ISBN 9780306423246.
- Garvin, Mary C.; Cooper, Jan (2008). Living in the Vermilion River Watershed. Oberlin, Ohio: Oberlin College.
- Gutschick, Raymond C.; Sandberg, Charles A. (1991). "Upper Devonian Biostratigraphy of Michigan Basin". In Catacosinos, Paul A.; Daniels, Paul A. (eds.). Early Sedimentary Evolution of the Michigan Basin. Boulder, Colo.: Geological Society of America. ISBN 9780813722566.
- Harrell, James A.; Hatfield, Craig B.; Gunn, George R. (1991). "Mississippian System of the Michigan Basin: Stratigraphy, Sedimentology, and Economic Geology". In Catacosinos, Paul A.; Daniels, Paul A. (eds.). Early Sedimentary Evolution of the Michigan Basin. Boulder, Colo.: Geological Society of America. ISBN 9780813722566.
- Harris, Ann G.; Tuttle, Esther; Tuttle, Sherwood D. (2004). Geology of National Parks. Dubuque, Ia.: Kendall/Hunt Publishing. ISBN 9780787299712.
- House, Michael R.; Gradstein, Felix M. (2006). "The Devonian Period". In Gradstein, Felix M.; Ogg, James G.; Smith, Alan G. (eds.). A Geologic Time Scale 2004. New York: Cambridge University Press. ISBN 9780521786737.
- Janssens, Adriaan; de Witt, Wallace (1976). Potential Natural Gas Resources in the Devonian Shales in Ohio. Columbus, Ohio: Ohio Department of Natural Resources, Division of Geological Survey.
- Keller, Gerta; Kerr, Andrew C. (2014). Volcanism, Impacts, and Mass Extinctions: Causes and Effects. Boulder, Colo.: Geological Society of America. ISBN 9780813725055.
- Lee, Sunggyu (1991). Oil Shale Technology. Boca Raton, Fla.: CRC Press. ISBN 0849346150.
- McDowell, Robert C. (1983). Stratigraphy of the Silurian Outcrop Belt on the East Side of the Cincinnati Arch in Kentucky, With Revisions in Nomenclature. Contributions to the Geology of Kentucky. Geological Survey Professional Paper 1151-F (Report). Washington, D.C.: U.S. Geological Survey.
- Milici, Robert C.; Swezey, Christopher S. (2006). Assessment of Appalachian Basin Oil and Gas Resources: Devonian Shale-Middle and Upper Paleozoic Total Petroleum System. Open File Report 2006-1237 (PDF) (Report). Washington, D.C.: U.S. Geological Survey.
- Pashin, Jack C.; Ettensohn, Frank R. (1995). Reevaluation of the Bedford-Berea Sequence in Ohio and Adjacent States: Forced Regression in a Foreland Basin. Special Paper 298. Boulder, Colo.: Geological Society of America. ISBN 9780813722986.
- Pepper, James F.; DeWitt, Wallace Jr.; Demarest, David F. (1954). Geology of the Bedford Shale and Berea Sandstone in the Appalachian Basin. Geologic Survey Professional Paper 259. Washington, D.C.: U.S. Government Printing Office.
- Pettijohn, F.J.; Potter, Paul Edwin; Siever, Raymond (1987). Sand and Sandstone. New York: Springer-Verlag. ISBN 9780387963501.
- Porebski, Szczepan J.; Steel, Ronald J. (September 2003). "Shelf-Margin Deltas: Their Stratigraphic Significance and Relation to Deepwater Sands". Earth-Science Reviews. 62 (3): 283–326. Bibcode:2003ESRv...62..283P. doi:10.1016/S0012-8252(02)00161-7.
- Rice, Charles L.; Sable, Edward G.; Dever, Garland R. Jr.; Kehn, Thomas M. (1979). "Kentucky". The Mississippian and Pennsylvanian (Carboniferous) Systems in the United States. Geological Survey Professional Paper 1110-F. Washington, D.C.: U.S. Government Printing Office.
- Sable, Edward G. (1979). "Eastern Interior Basin Region". In Craig, Lawrence C.; Connor, Carol Waite (eds.). Paleotectonic Investigations of the Mississippian System in the United States. Part I. Introduction and Regional Analyses of the Mississippian System. Washington, D.C.: U.S. Government Printing Office.
- Schumacher, Gregory A.; Potter, Paul Edwin; Noger, Martin C.; Dever, Garland R. Jr.; Klee, John (2001). Roadside Geology Along the Alexandria to Ashland Highway (Kentucky 9, Kentucky 10, and U.S. 23) Between Greenup Locks and Dam and Interstate 64. Special Publication 2, Series XII (PDF). Lexington, Ky.: University of Kentucky. Archived (PDF) from the original on 2018-03-30.
- Williams, Arthur B. (1940). Geology of the Cleveland Region. Pocket Natural History No. 9. Geological Series No. 1. Cleveland: Cleveland Museum of Natural History.
- Wilmarth, M. Grace (1938). Lexicon of Geologic Names of the United States (Including Alaska). Part 1, A-L. Geologic Survey Bulletin 896. Washington, D.C.: U.S. Government Printing Office.
