= Ohio Shale =

Geologic formation in Ohio

- Stratigraphic range: Late Devonian; Late Devonian
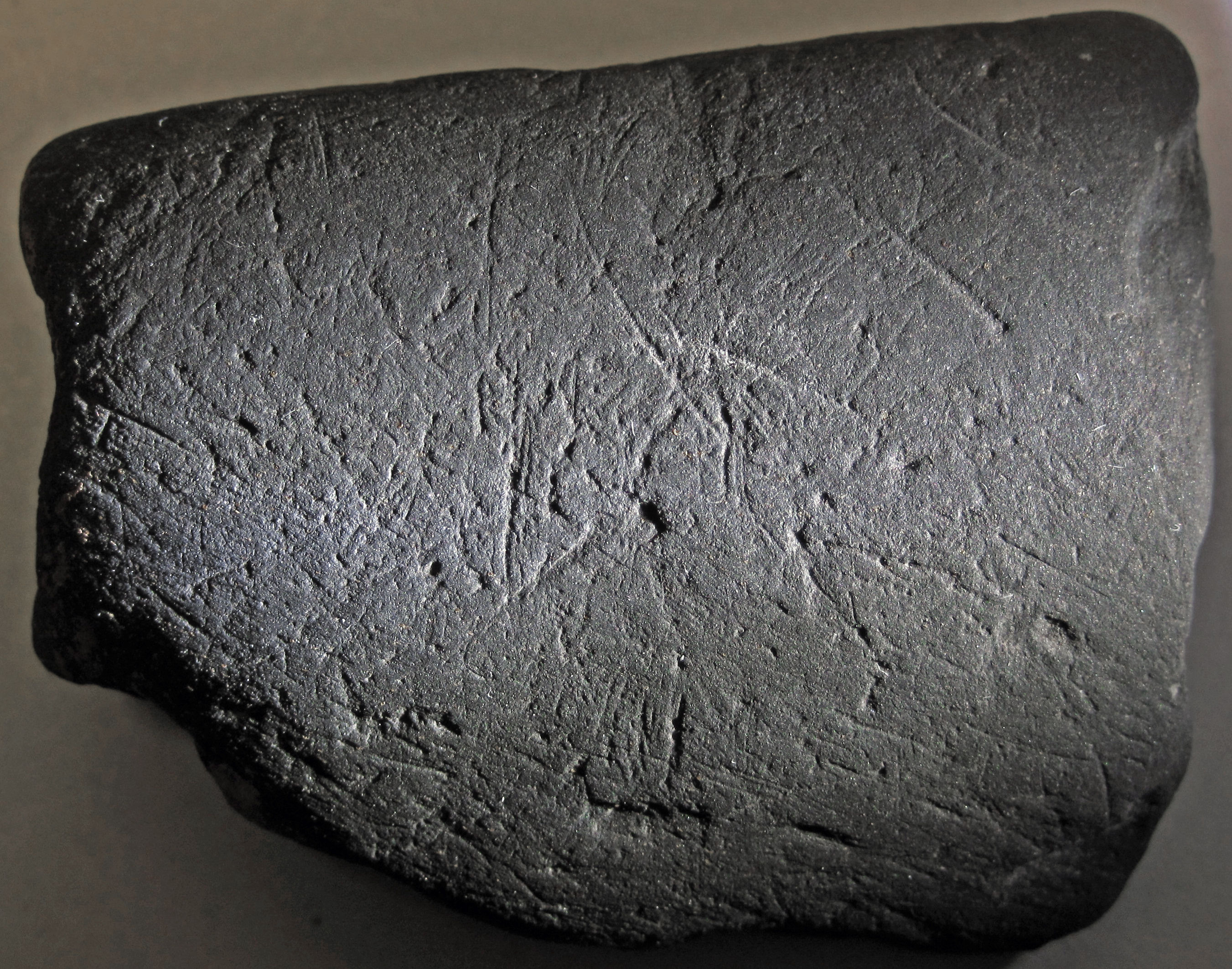
- Black mudshale with glacial striations (Ohio Shale)
- Type: Formation
- Sub-units: Cleveland Shale; Chagrin Formation; Huron Shale
- Underlies: Bedford Shale, Berea Sandstone, and Cussewago Sandstone
- Overlies: Java Formation and Olentangy Shale

Lithology
- Primary: shale

Location
- Region: Oklahoma, Ohio, Virginia Kentucky, Tennessee, Ontario
- Country: United States and Canada

The Ohio Shale is a geologic formation in the United States and Canada. It preserves fossils dating back to the Devonian period.

== See also ==
- List of fossiliferous stratigraphic units in Ohio
