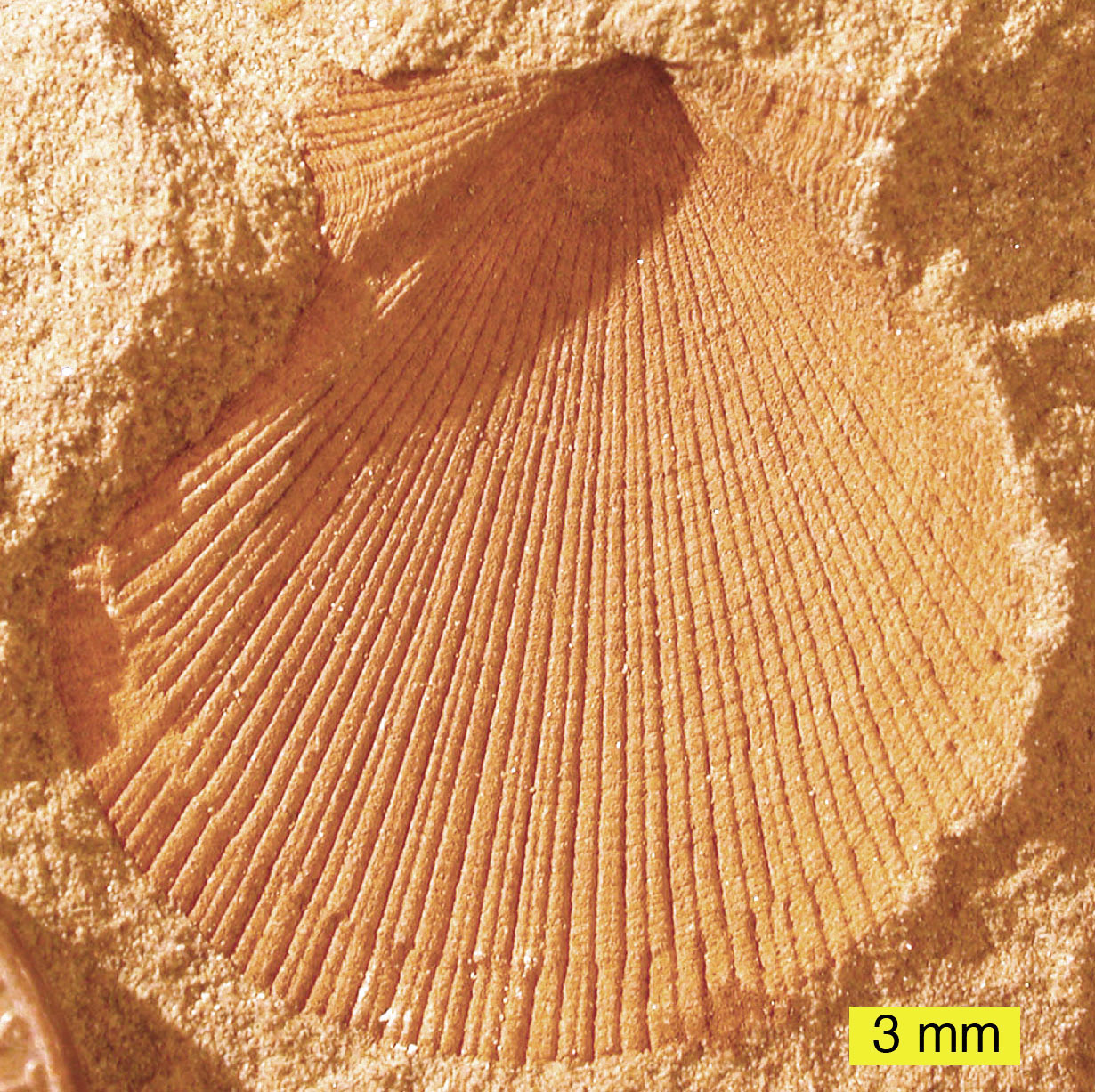
- A. subcardiformis from the Logan Formation (Lower Carboniferous) of Wooster, Ohio (external mold)

Scientific classification
- Domain: Eukaryota
- Kingdom: Animalia
- Phylum: Mollusca
- Class: Bivalvia
- Order: Pectinida
- Family: †Aviculopectinidae
- Genus: †Aviculopecten; M'Coy, 1851

Type species
- Aviculopecten planoradiatus

Species
- See text

= Aviculopecten =

Aviculopecten Temporal range: Early Devonian – Late Triassic

Extinct genus of bivalves

Aviculopecten is an extinct genus of bivalve mollusc that lived from the Early Devonian to the Late Triassic in Asia, Australia, Europe, North America, and South America.

A fine fossil of the species A. subcardiformis has been found in the 345 million year old Logan Formation of Wooster, Ohio. It is an external mould and the impression left by the valve is so clear that the fine ridges and even the growth lines are visible.

== Species ==
The following species of Aviculopecten have been described:

- A. altus
- A. appalachianus
- A. arctisulcatus
- A. artiensis
- A. asiaticus
- A. ballingerana
- A. basilicus
- A. batesvillensis
- A. beipeiensis
- A. bellatulus
- A. bertrandi
- A. bouei
- A. caodigouensis
- A. columbianus
- A. coryeanus
- A. coxanus
- A. crebristriatus
- A. crenistriatus
- A. cunctatus
- A. cypticostatus
- A. densistriatus
- A. derajatensis
- A. diemenensis
- A. draschei
- A. eaglensis
- A. expositus
- A. flabellum
- A. frederixi
- A. germanus
- A. giganteus
- A. girtyi
- A. gradicosta
- A. gryphus
- A. guangxiensis
- A. halensis
- A. hardmani
- A. hataii
- A. hayasakai
- A. hemisphaerus
- A. idahoensis
- A. imbricatus
- A. inspeciosus
- A. jabiensis
- A. jennyi
- A. jiaozishanensis
- A. kaibabensis
- A. katwahiensis
- A. keoughensis
- A. khinganensis
- A. kunlunensis
- A. langdaiensis
- A. latrobensis
- A. lobanovae
- A. lopingensis
- A. malayensis
- A. mayesensis
- A. mazonensis
- A. mccoyi
- A. media
- A. minutum
- A. misrikhanensis
- A. moorei
- A. morahensis
- A. morrowensis
- A. multilineatus
- A. multiradiatus
- A. nikolaewi
- A. nitidus
- A. nodocosta
- A. occidentalis
- A. onukii
- A. orientalis
- A. ozarkensis
- A. panxianensis
- A. paradoxus
- A. pealei
- A. peculiaris
- A. pitkinensis
- A. planoradiatus
- A. ponderosus
- A. praecox
- A. prototextorius
- A. pseudoctenostreon
- A. pseudoradiatus
- A. punjabensis
- A. qinghaiensis
- A. regularis
- A. rossiensis
- A. ruklensis
- A. scheremetus
- A. serdobowae
- A. shiroshitai
- A. sicanus
- A. simplicus
- A. spinocostatus
- A. squamiger
- A. squamula
- A. squamula
- A. subparadoxus
- A. subregularis
- A. subtristriatus
- A. sulaensis
- A. sumnerensis
- A. symmetricus
- A. terminalis
- A. tompo
- A. tristriatus
- A. uralicus
- A. verbeeki
- A. waageni
- A. wilczekiformis
- A. winchelli
- A. wynnei
- A. xiaoyuanchongensis
- A. yunnanensis
- A. zhongyingensis
