= Berea Sandstone =

Sandstone formation in the United States

- Stratigraphic range: Late Devonian
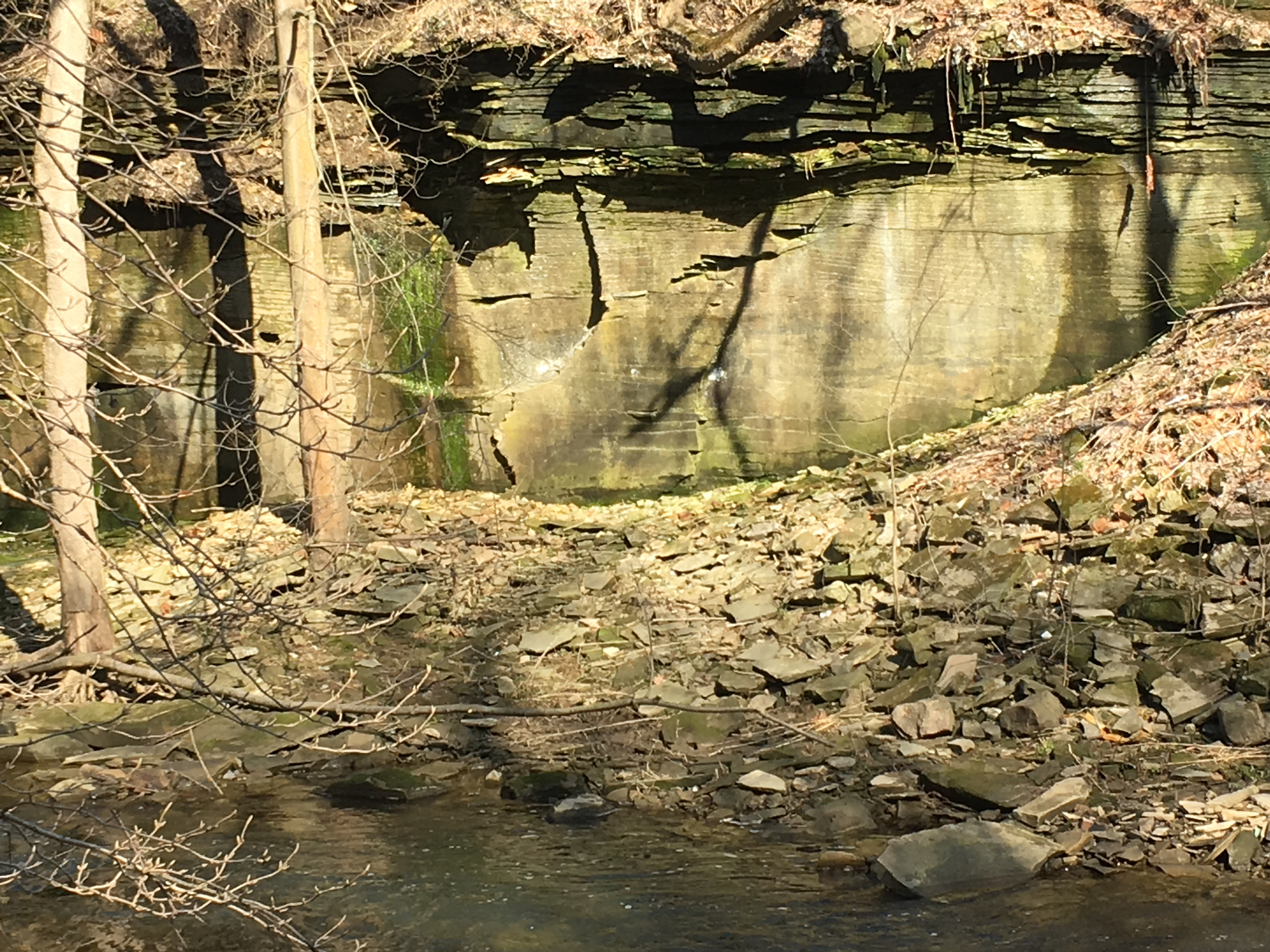
- Berea Sandstone exposed at headwaters of the Sandusky River, Crawford County, Ohio.
- Type: Formation
- Unit of: Waverly Group
- Underlies: Sunbury Shale
- Overlies: Bedford Shale and Ohio Shale

Lithology
- Primary: Sandstone, Siltstone

Location
- Region: Michigan, Ohio, Pennsylvania, West Virginia, Kentucky
- Country: United States

Type section
- Named for: Berea, Ohio

Berea Sandstone, also known as Berea Grit, is a sandstone formation in the U.S. states of Michigan, Ohio, Pennsylvania, West Virginia, and Kentucky. It is named after Berea, Ohio. The sandstone has been used as a building stone and is a source of oil and gas.

== Description ==
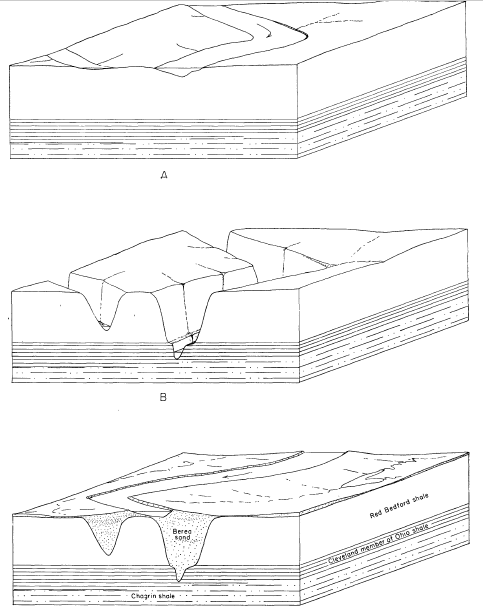
Diagram showing deposition of sand that would become Berea Sandstone

In the Appalachian Basin, Berea Sandstone is present in eastern Ohio, western Pennsylvania, western West Virginia, and eastern Kentucky. In the Michigan Basin, the sandstone is present in the eastern part of the state, thickest near Michigan's Thumb. The two deposits are separated by the Cincinnati Arch and are disconnected from each other. The sandstone overlies the Bedford Shale and the Ohio Shale and underlies the Sunbury Shale. Berea Sandstone is light gray to buff-colored in the form of siltstone and fine- to medium-grained sandstone. In places it is hard to distinguish from the underlying Bedford Shale. Berea Sandstone is classified as a member of the Waverly Group. Berea Sandstone is up to 72 meters (236 ft) thick in Lorain County, Ohio, and up to 79 meters (259 ft) thick in Huron County, Michigan.

The sandstone was named "Berea Grit" by Ohio geologist J. S. Newberry in 1874. He named it after Berea, Ohio, for its extensive quarries of the stone.

In Michigan, the petroleum industry has referred to the Ellsworth Shale as "Berea", but this formation is distinct from Berea Sandstone and is laterally separated by Antrim Shale.

=== Age and formation ===
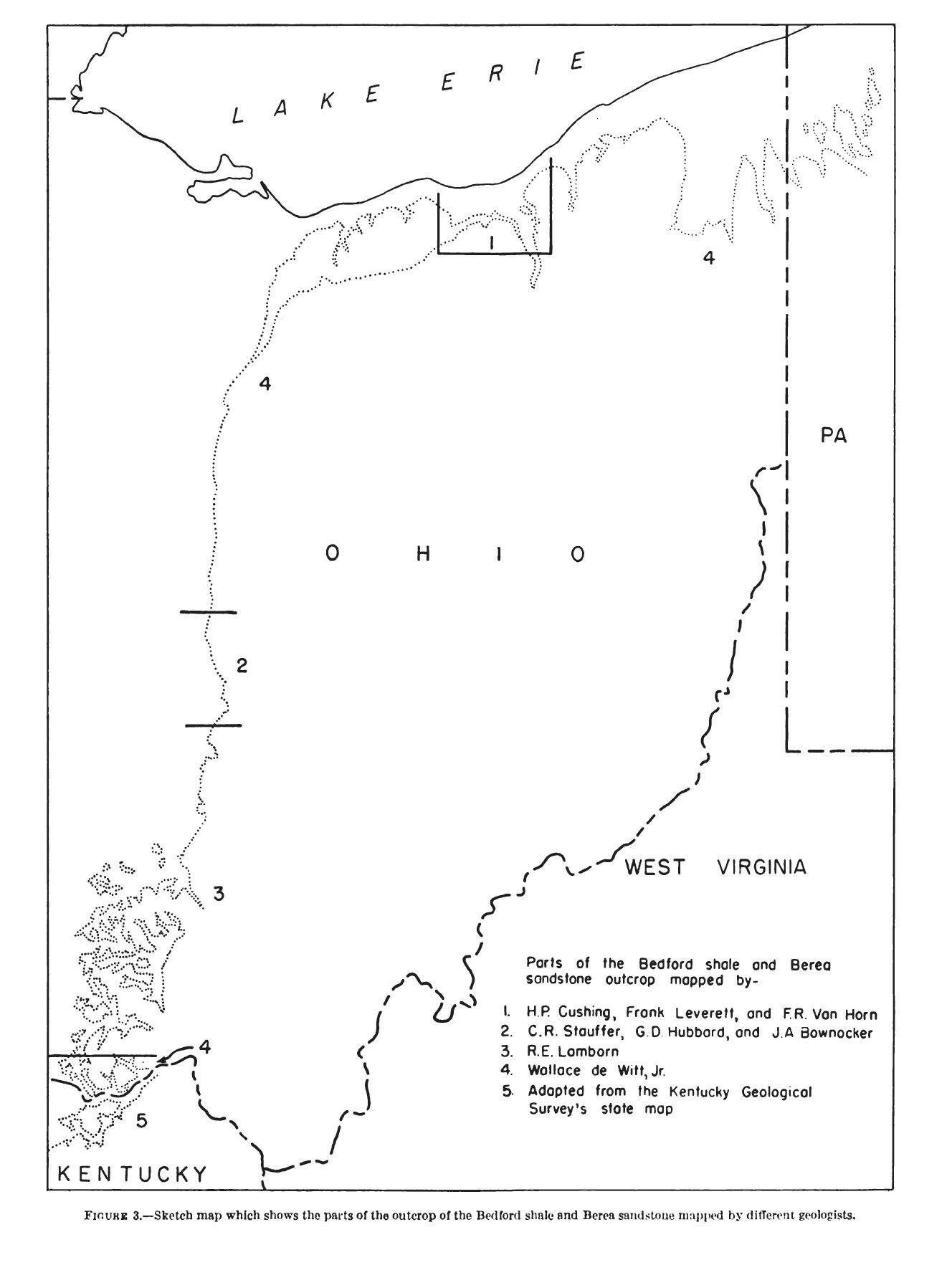

Berea Sandstone was formed in the Late Devonian period. Prior to the 1970s, it was assigned a Mississippian age. The Devonian-Carboniferous boundary was realigned based on research from Europe, but various geologists were not aware of the changes and so incorrectly assigned Berea Sandstone to the Kinderhookian (early Mississippian).

The majority of the sand which formed the Berea Sandstone came from the north, flowing in a river from the highlands of eastern Canada. It was deposited in a river delta environment. Pepper, et al., hypothesized that the river flowed first into the Ohio basin before switching course to the Michigan basin, thus the Michigan Berea Sandstone would be slightly younger. There is a downwarp in the Cincinnati arch, called the Ontario sag, that if it was present at the formation of Berea Sandstone, could mean that it formed a continuous belt of sediment between the Appalachian and Michigan basins. Nevertheless, subsequent erosion disconnected the two deposits.

=== Fossils ===
Berea Sandstone is generally unfossiliferous. However some fossils have been found, including fish of the genera Ctenacanthus and Gonatodus, plants of the genus Annularia, and some brachiopods.

== Uses ==
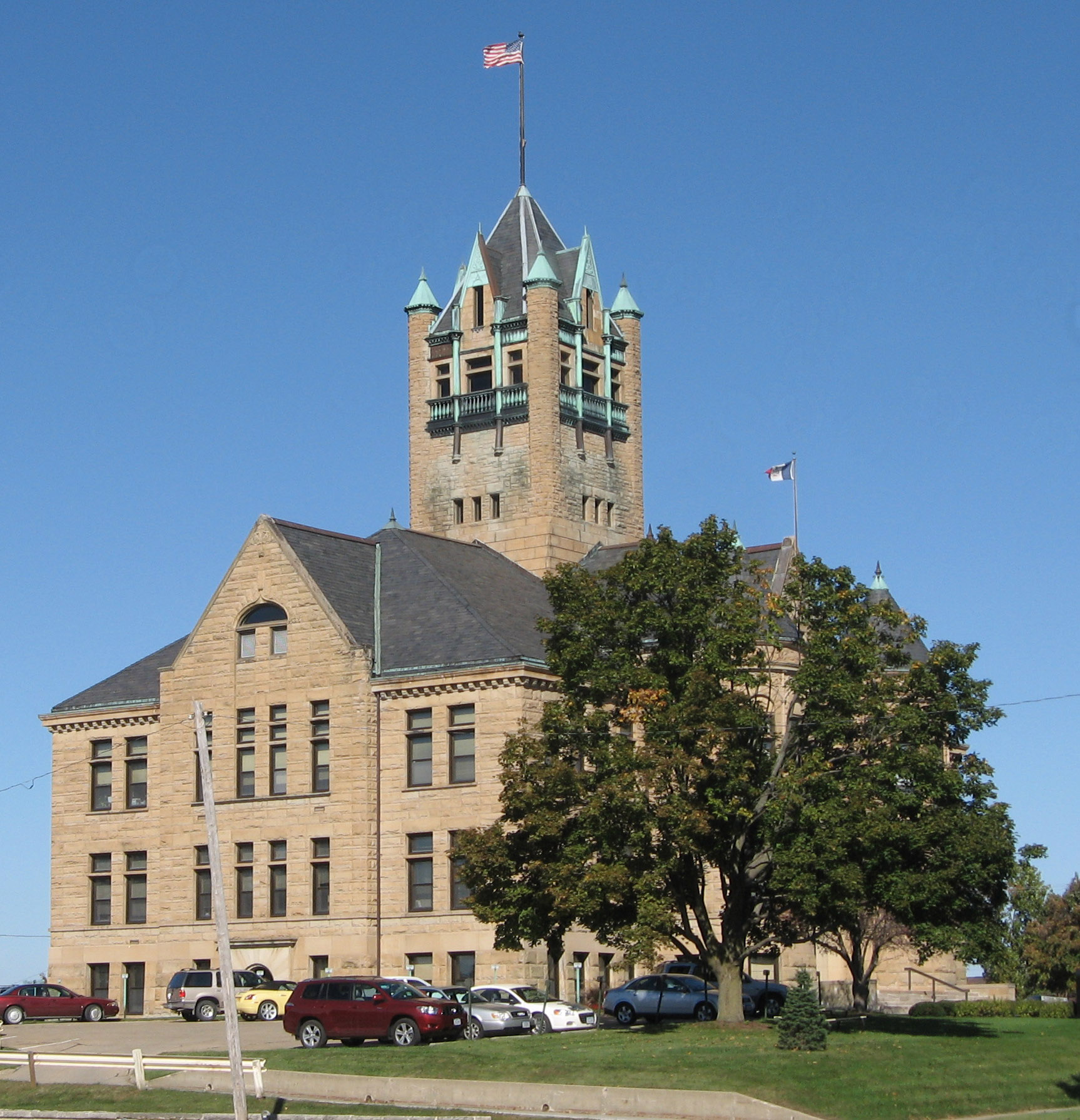
The Johnson County Courthouse in Iowa is built of Berea Sandstone.

Buildings constructed of Berea Sandstone include the Johnson County Courthouse in Iowa and the Brown County Courthouse in South Dakota. The Centre Block building of the Parliament of Canada, both before and after reconstruction, uses Berea Sandstone as window and door trim.

Berea Sandstone has also been used as flagstone and for paving. Fine grained stone has been used for grindstones and whetstones.

== Industry ==
=== Quarrying ===
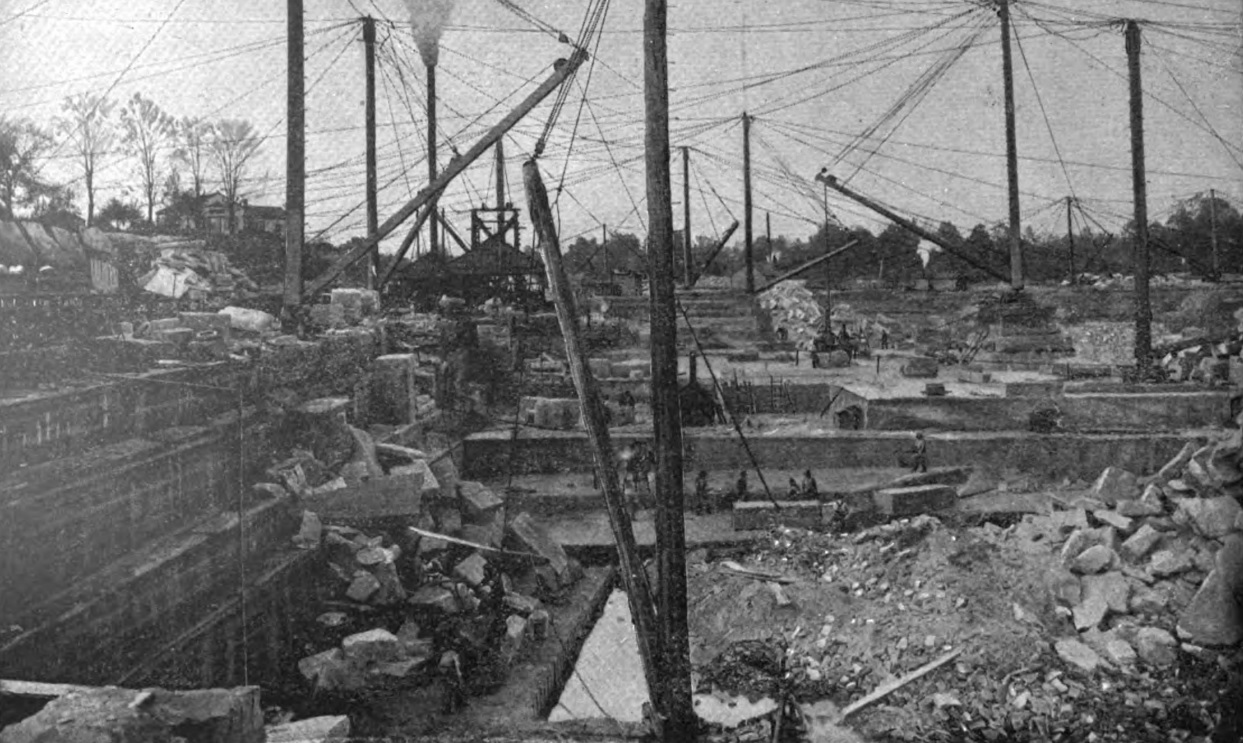
Quarry No. 6 of the Cleveland Stone Company at Berea, Ohio, circa 1893

Quarrying of Berea Sandstone began in 1830. Until around 1840 or 1845, only grindstones were produced before diversifying into building and flagstones. More than a dozen different companies quarried the sandstone, before all consolidating into the Cleveland Stone Company by 1893, which was the largest sandstone producer in the United States at the time.

=== Oil and gas ===
Berea Sandstone is a host of oil and natural gas. Commercial gas development began in 1859–60 with a well at East Liverpool, Ohio. Oil was discovered in the Berea Sandstone in 1860 in Mecca Township, Trumbull County, Ohio. In Michigan, Berea Sandstone oil was first discovered in 1925 at Saginaw; this field accounted for the entirety of Michigan's oil production until 1927. By 2011, oil production from Berea Sandstone led northeastern Kentucky to be the most productive region of that state.

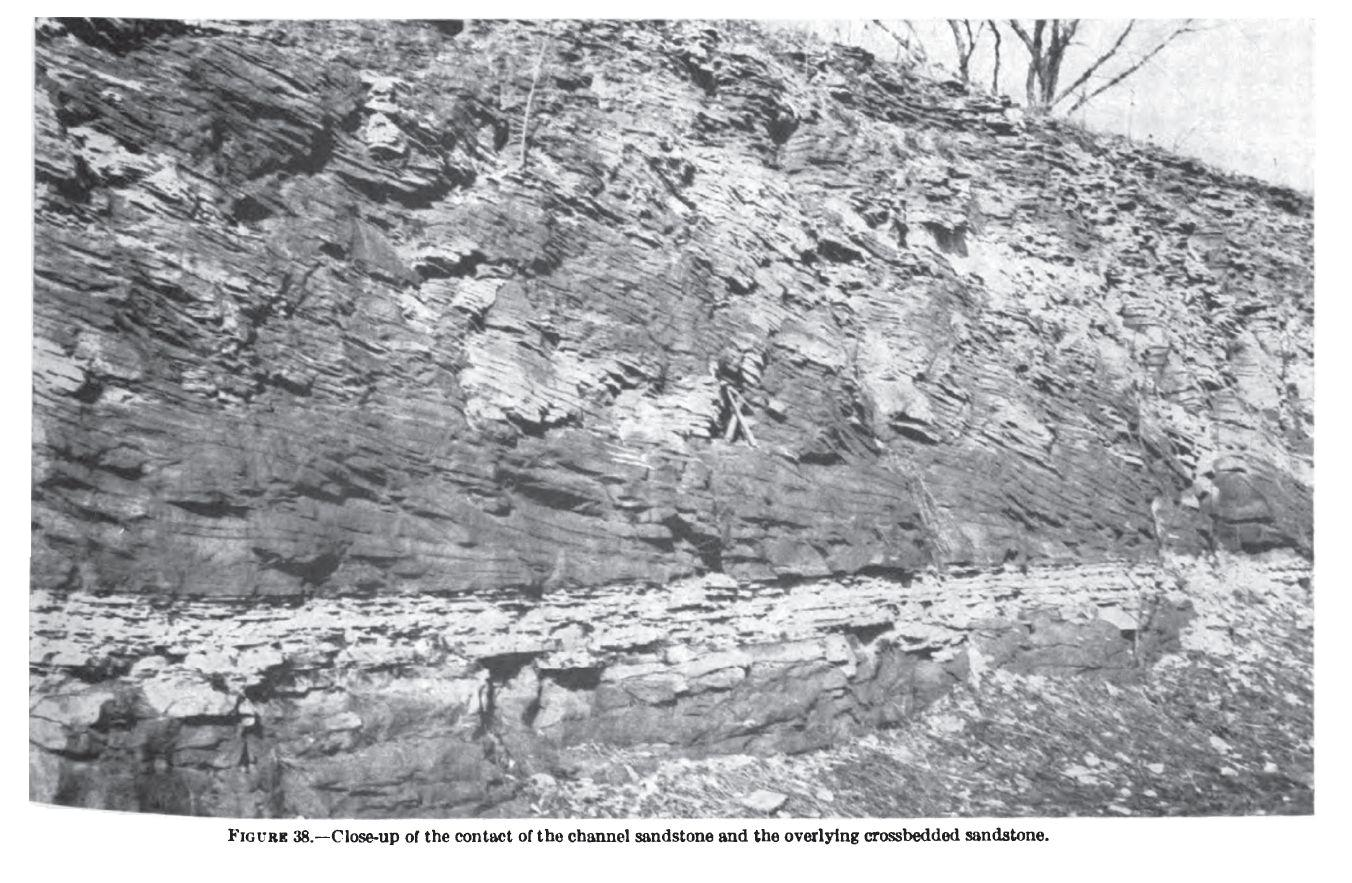
Fig 38 Close-up of the contact of the channel sandstone

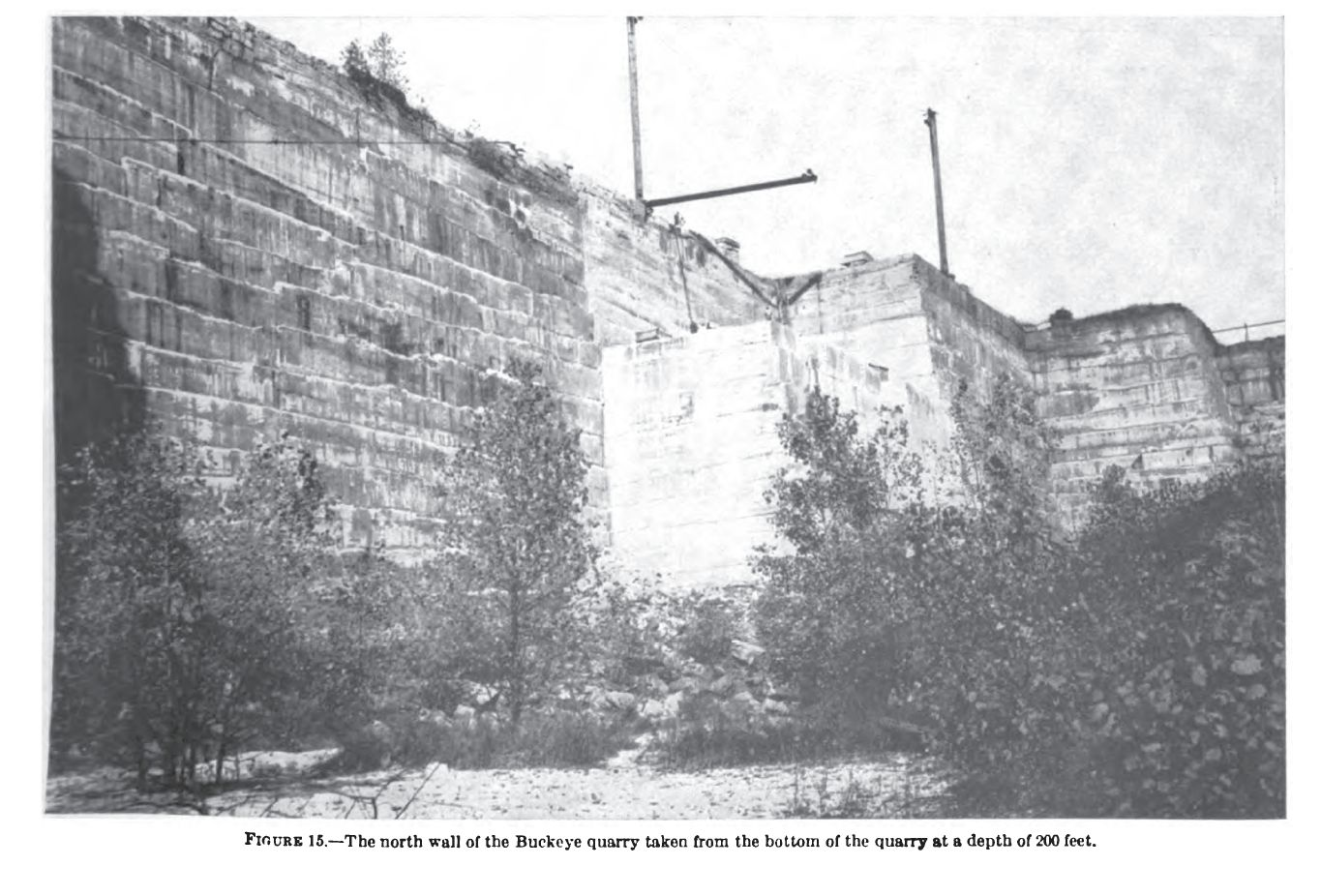
Fig 15 North wall of the Buckeye quarry

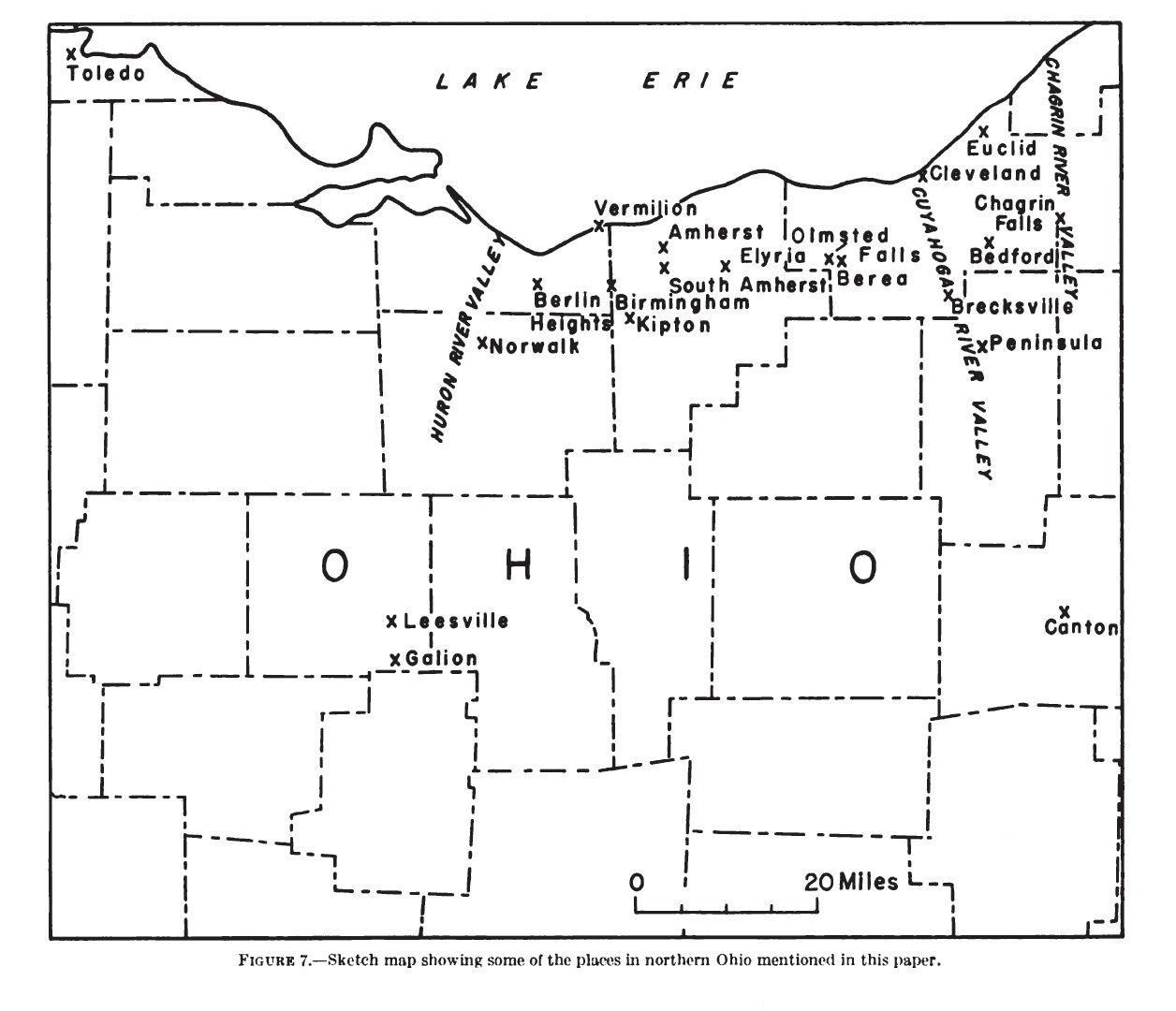
Fig 07 Sketch map showing some of the places in northern Ohio.

== See also ==
- List of sandstones
