= Maxville, Ohio =

Unincorporated community in Ohio, U.S.

Coordinates: 39°37′04″N 82°20′02″W

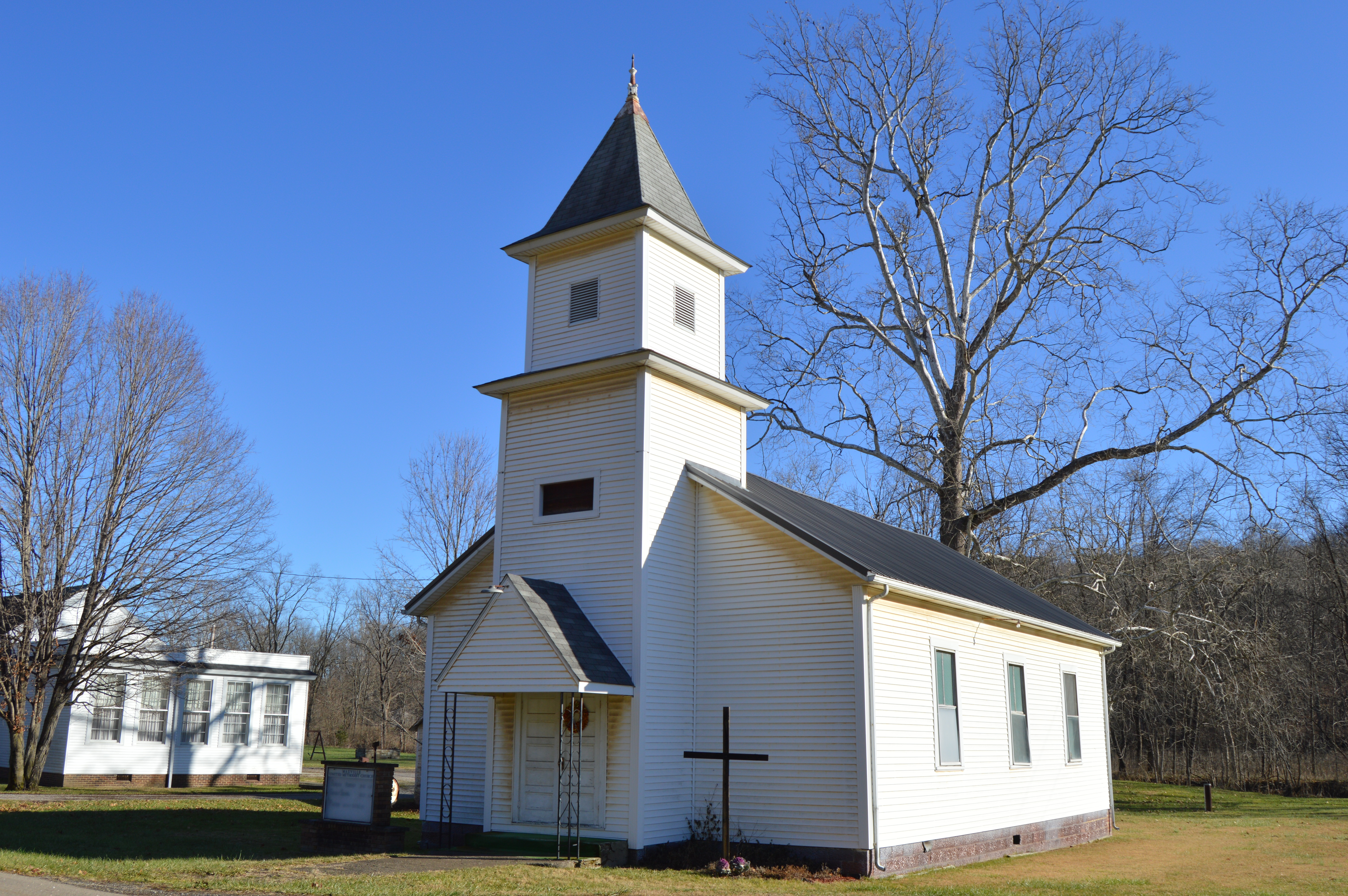
Methodist church on State Route 668

Maxville is an unincorporated community in Perry County, in the U.S. state of Ohio. Maxville Limestone, a natural limestone formation, was named after the community.

== History ==
A post office was established at Maxville in 1855, and remained in operation until 1904. The community's name is derived from shortening and alteration of the name of William McCormick, a first settler.

== Notable person ==
Edwin D. Ricketts, a U.S. Representative from Ohio, was born near Maxville in 1867.
