= Johnson County Courthouse (Iowa) =

- U.S. National Register of Historic Places
- Johnson County Courthouse pictured in 2024

- Location within Iowa Location within the United States
- Location: S. Clinton St. Iowa City, Iowa
- Coordinates: 41°39′22″N 91°32′7″W
- Built: 1899–1901
- Architect: Rush, Bowman and Rush
- Architectural style: Richardsonian Romanesque; Shingle Style
- MPS: County Courthouses in Iowa TR
- NRHP reference No.: 75000692
- Added to NRHP: March 27, 1975

The Johnson County Courthouse in Iowa City, Iowa, the county seat of Johnson County, United States, was completed in 1901; it was the second courthouse to stand at this location. The building was listed on the National Register of Historic Places in 1975.

== History ==
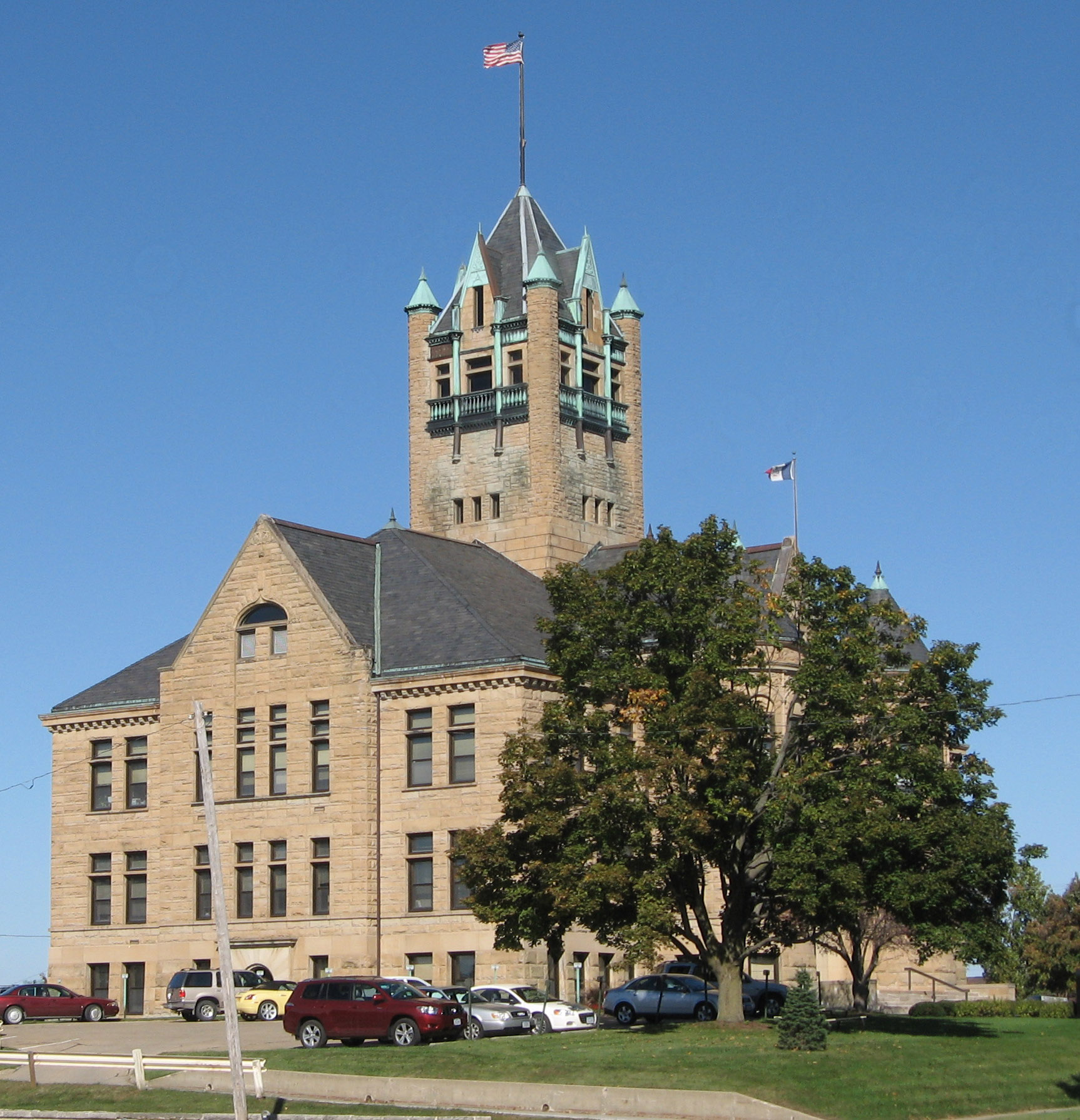
Rear of the courthouse

Johnson County's first courthouse was a two-story frame structure built in 1838 in Napoleon. After the county seat was moved to Iowa City a 56-by-28-foot (17.1 by 8.5 m), two-story brick courthouse, was completed in 1842. A jail was built at the same time. The first courthouse built on the present courthouse square was built about 1856, but the records are unclear as to its specifications. In 1875 a suggestion was made that the courthouse should be donated to the University of Iowa, and the city and county would build a joint facility. The measure was to be put to the voters, but it never appeared on a ballot. By 1897 cracks were detected on the south wall, endangering the structure and the records it housed. Construction on the present courthouse began in 1899. The building was completed in 1901 for approximately $111,000. Its slate roof was damaged in a 2006 tornado.

== Architecture ==
A. William Rush of the Grand Rapids, Michigan architectural firm of Rush, Bowman and Rush designed the building. The courthouse was built on a square south of the central business district with a commanding view of the surrounding area. It is notable for its fine Berea sandstone exterior carvings and interior stained glass domes. Stylistically, it features characteristics of three architectural trends from the era it was built: the arched openings and massiveness of the Richardsonian Romanesque; the vegetal ornamentation of Louis Sullivan above the main entrance; and the voluminous geometric massing of the Shingle Style. The central tower rises out of the rectangular-plan building. The irregular roofline is composed of conical roofs, turrets and the step gables of the end pavilions.

== See also ==
- List of Iowa county courthouses
