= Rushville Shale =

Geologic formation in Ohio, US

- Stratigraphic range: Mississippian
- Type: Formation
- Underlies: Maxville Limestone
- Overlies: Logan Formation

Location
- Country: United States
- Extent: Ohio

The Rushville Shale is a geologic formation in Ohio. It dates back to the Mississippian.
