= Waverly Group =

Geologic group in the United States

- Stratigraphic range: Carboniferous
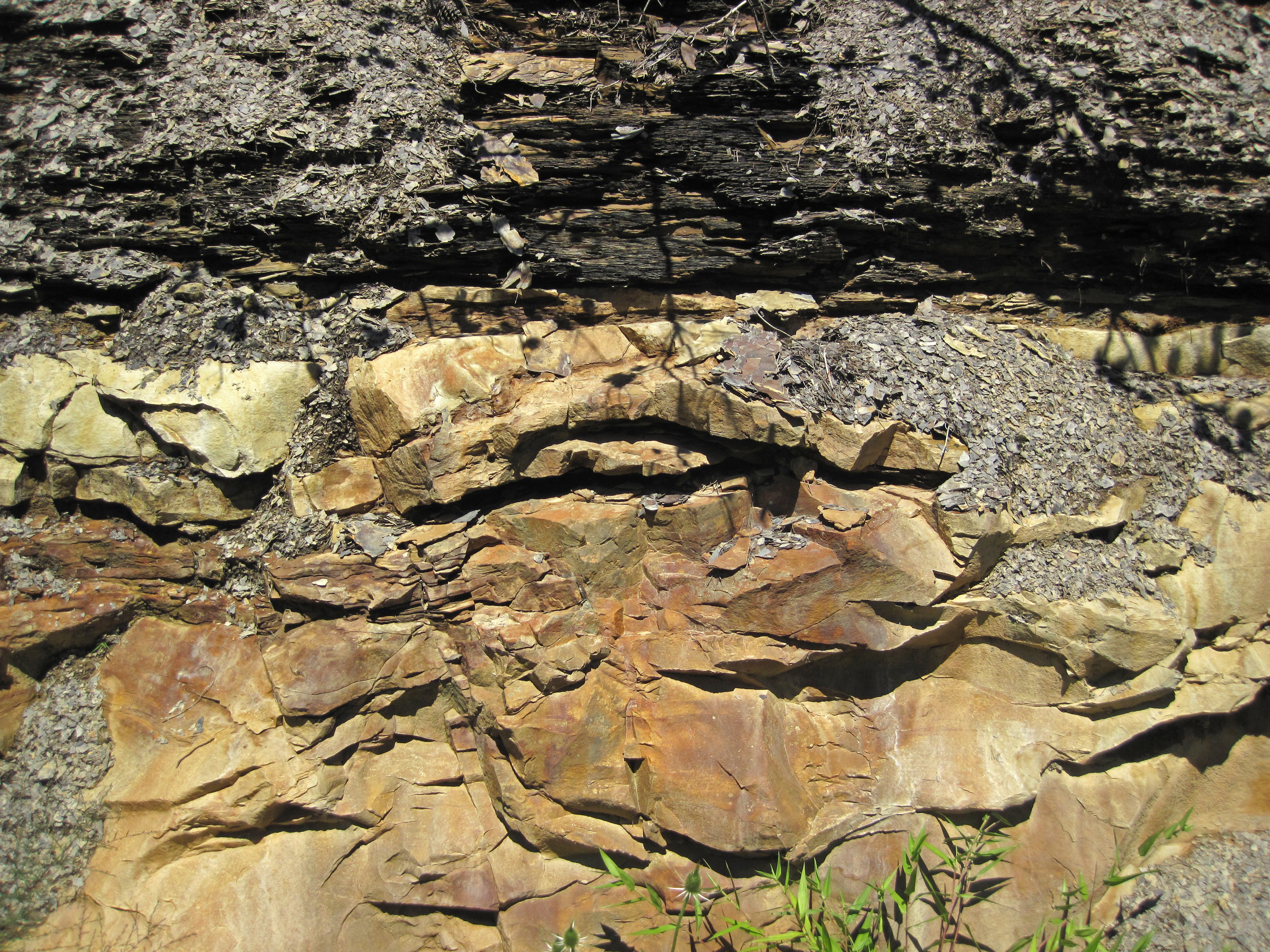
- Berea Sandstone-Sunbury Shale contact (Tener Mountain roadcut, Ohio)
- Type: Group
- Sub-units: Bedford Shale; Berea Sandstone; Sunbury Shale; Cuyahoga Formation; Logan Formation; Maxville Limestone

Location
- Region: Michigan, Ohio
- Country: United States

The Waverly Group is a geologic group in Michigan and Ohio. It preserves fossils dating back to the Carboniferous period.

The groups consists of the following formations:

- Bedford Shale
- Berea Sandstone
- Sunbury Shale
- Cuyahoga Formation
- Logan Formation
- Maxville Limestone
