= Cuyahoga Formation =

Geologic formation in Ohio

- Stratigraphic range: Mississippian
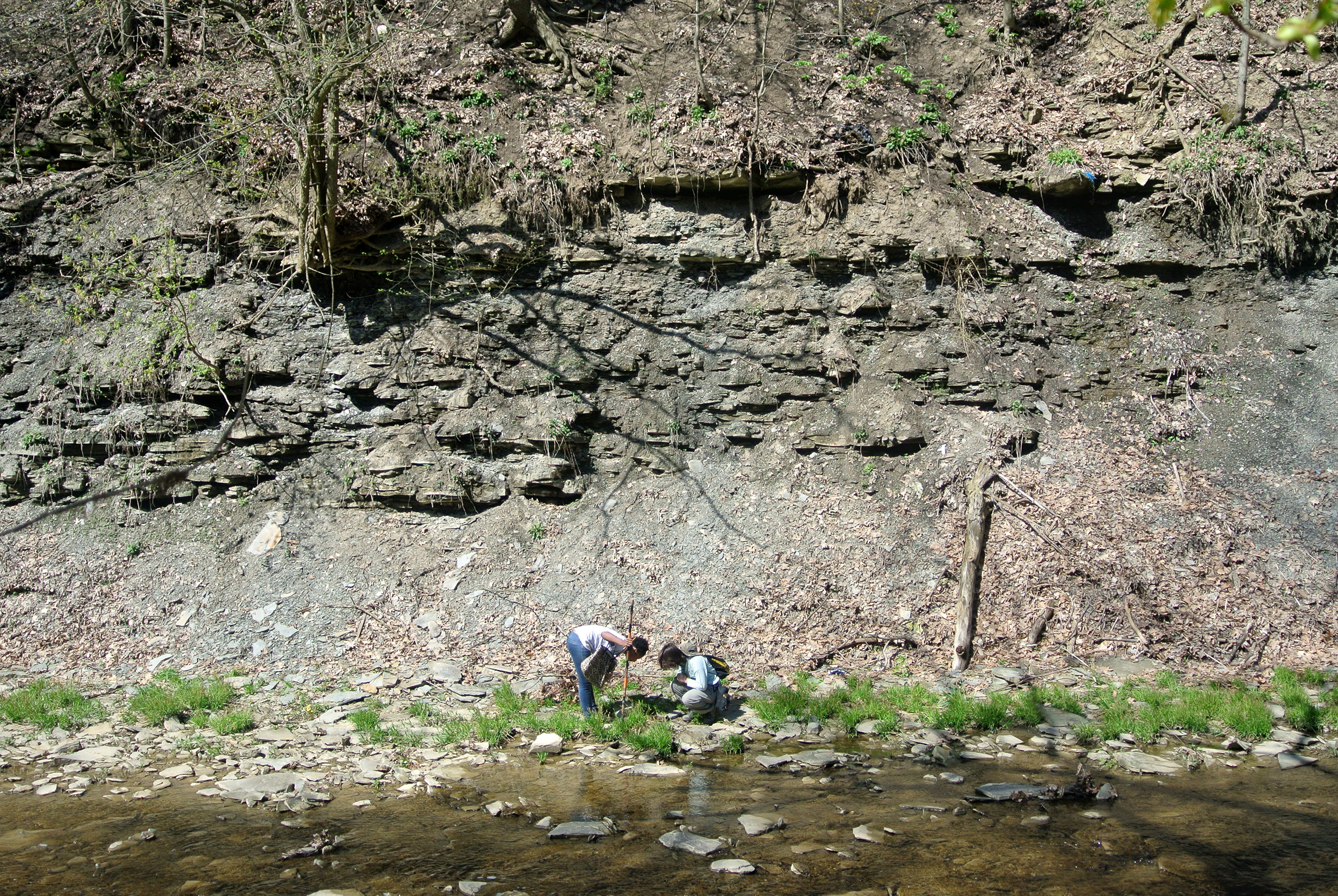
- Meadville Shale Member of the Cuyahoga Formation exposed in Lodi, Ohio.
- Type: Formation
- Unit of: Waverly Group
- Sub-units: In Central and Southern Ohio Meadville Shale Sharpsville Sandstone Racoon Shale Fairfield Member Dugway Member Buena Vista Member In Pennsylvania and North Eastern Ohio Meadville Shale Sharpsville Sandstone Orangeville Shale
- Underlies: Logan Formation
- Overlies: Sunbury Shale

Location
- Region: Ohio
- Country: United States

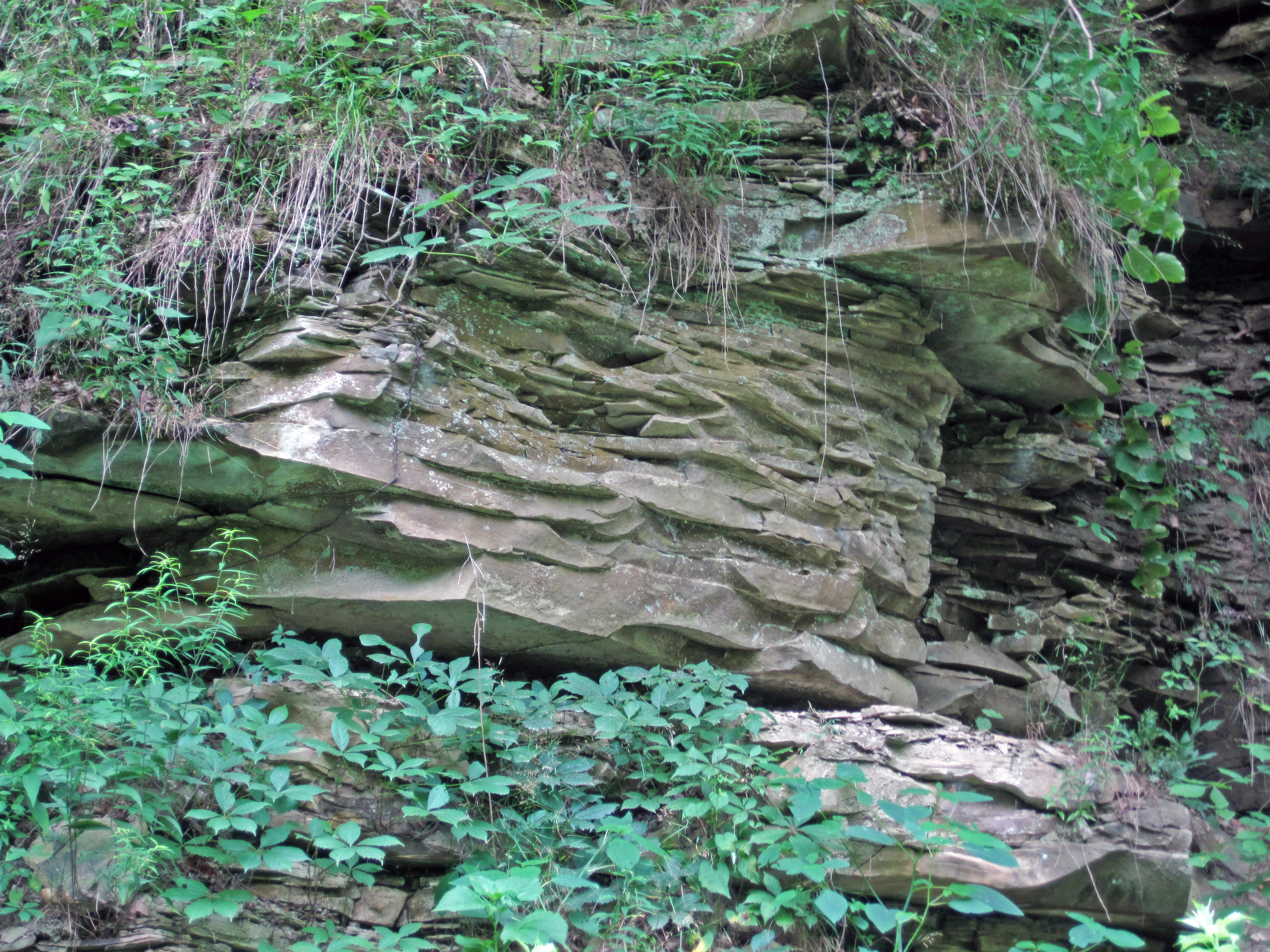
Buena Vista Member, Cuyahoga Formation; Reynoldsburg, Ohio

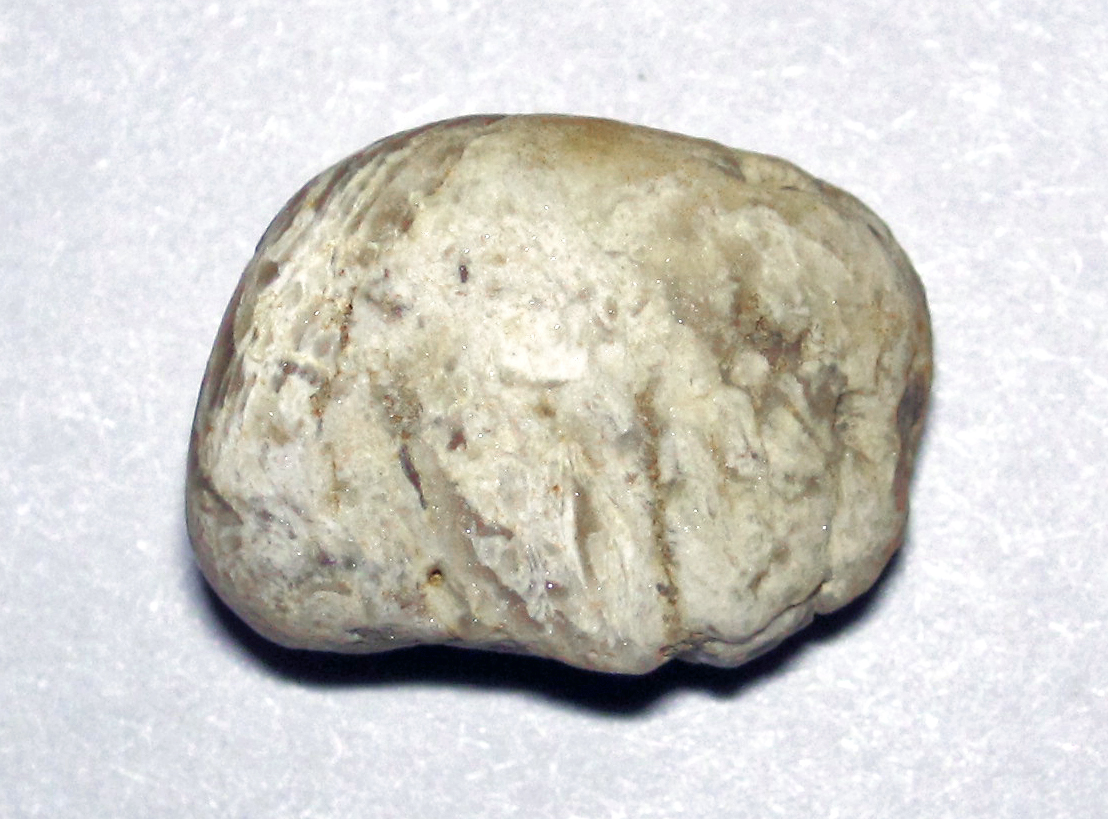
Paleopebble (Dugway Member, Cuyahoga Formation; Licking County, Ohio)

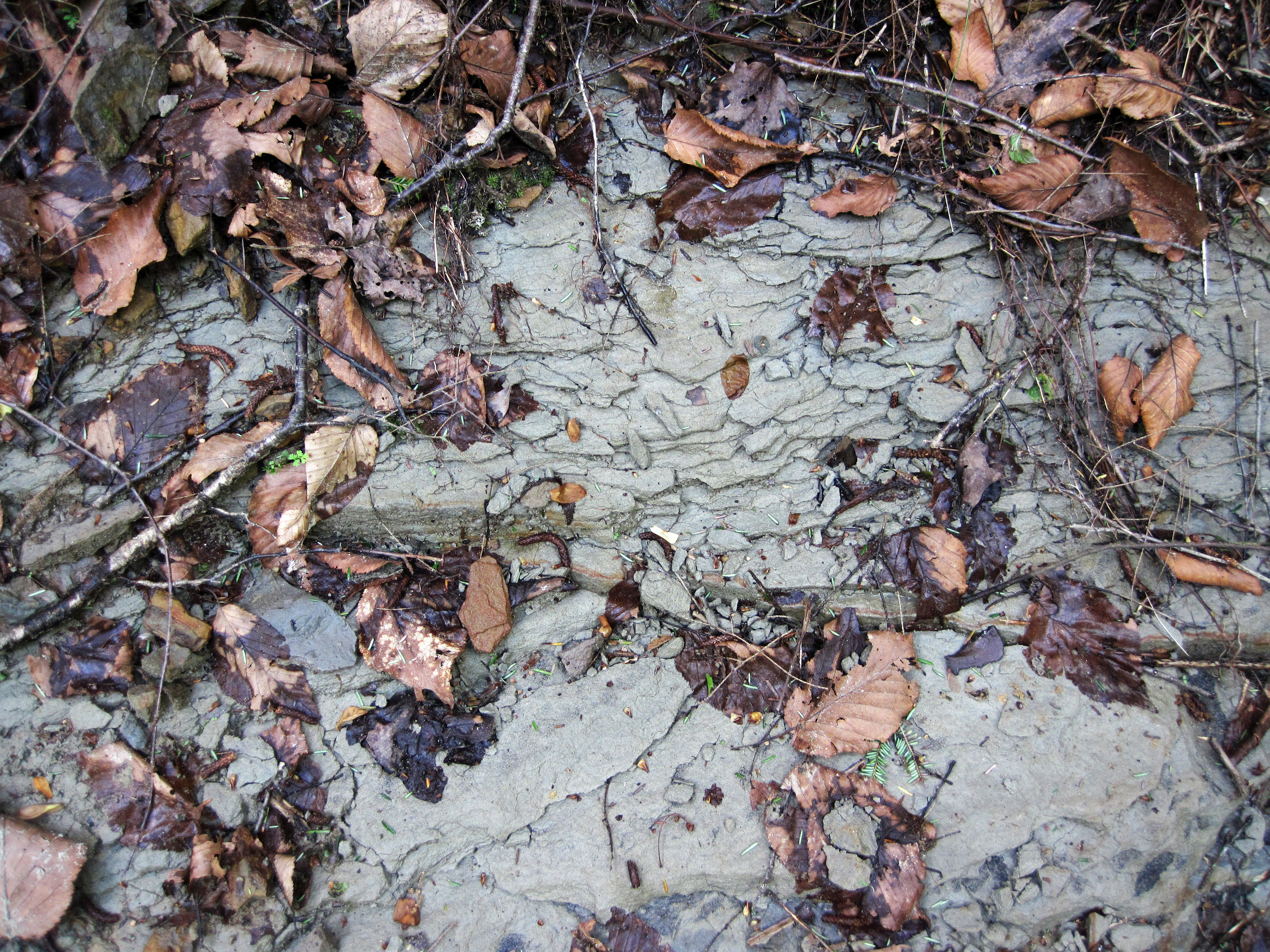
Gray sandstone (Fairfield Member, Cuyahoga Formation; Hocking Hills, Ohio)

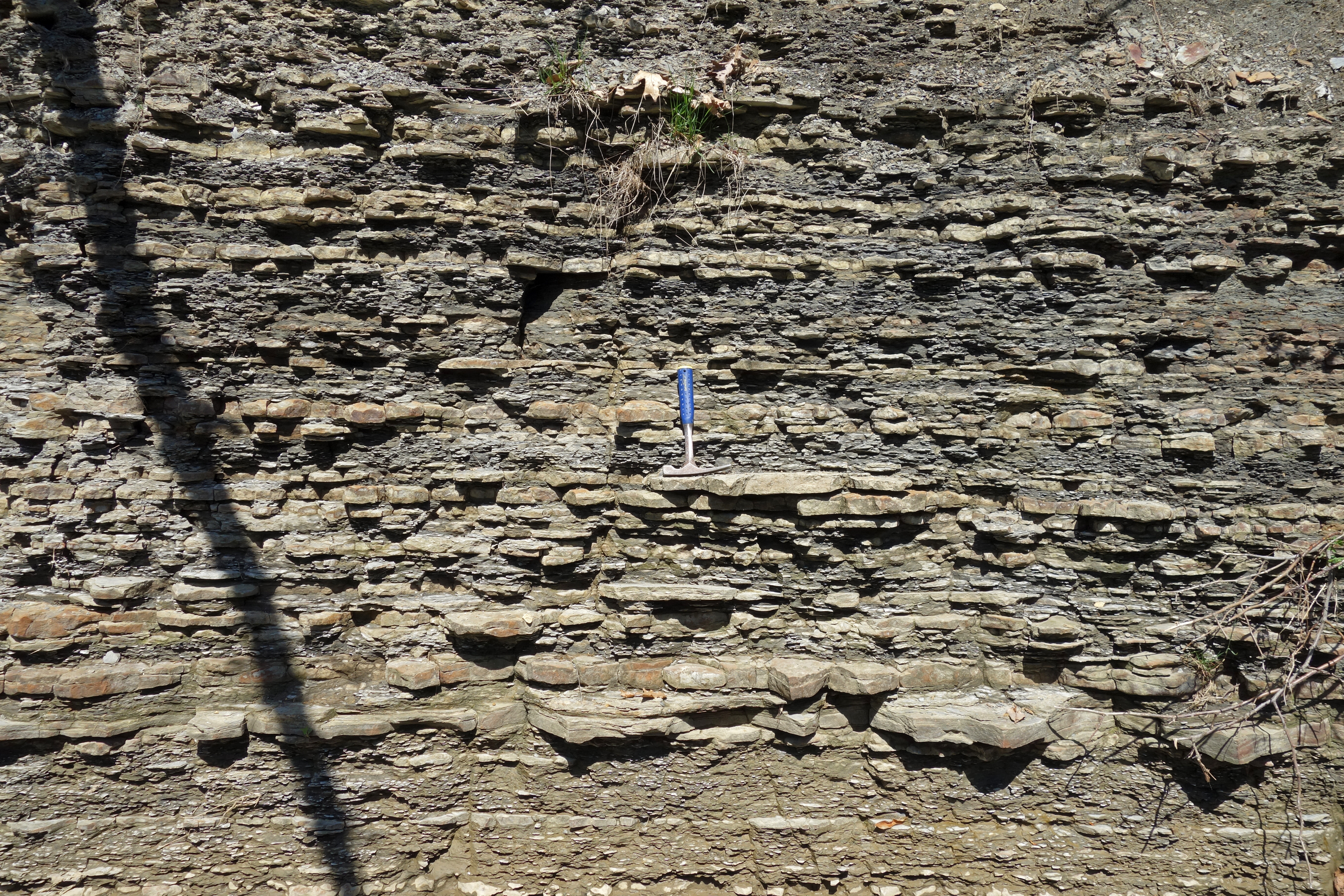
Raccoon Shale (Cuyahoga Formation; Heath, Ohio)

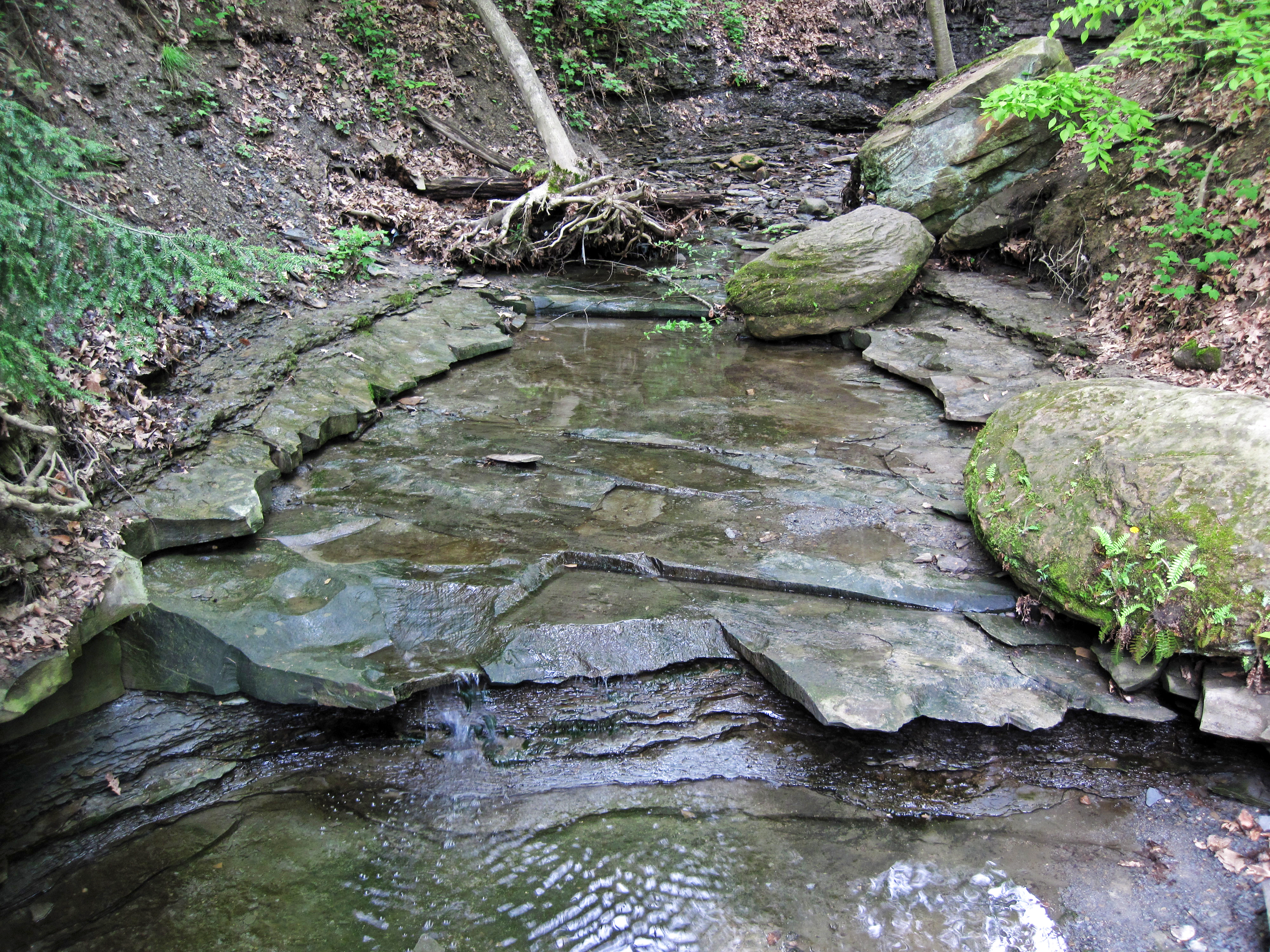
Sharpsville Sandstone Member (Cuyahoga Formation; Cuyahoga Falls, Ohio)

The Cuyahoga Formation is a geologic formation in Ohio. The age of the formation is difficult to determine, because of a lack of diagnostic fossils. Roughly, the formation dates from the Late Kinderhookian (354.8 to 350.8 million years ago) to the Middle Osagean (347.7 to 344.5 million years ago). Eight members are recognized, among them the Orangeville Shale, Sharpsville Sandstone, and Meadville Shale.

It preserves fossils dating to the Mississippian subperiod of the Carboniferous period.

== See also ==
- List of fossiliferous stratigraphic units in Ohio
