= Cussewago Formation =

- Stratigraphic range: Devonian
- Type: Formation
- Underlies: Bedford Shale
- Overlies: Riceville Shale
- Thickness: up to 100'

Lithology
- Primary: Sandstone
- Other: Shale

Location
- Region: Pennsylvania
- Country: United States

Type section
- Named for: Cusswago Valley
- Named by: White (1881, p. 94-96)

The Cussewago Formation is a geologic formation found Pennsylvania, Ohio and West Virginia. This formation represents a paleo-river delta containing sandstone as well as siltstone and shale.
