= Maxville Limestone =

Geologic formation in Ohio, United States

- Stratigraphic range: Carboniferous
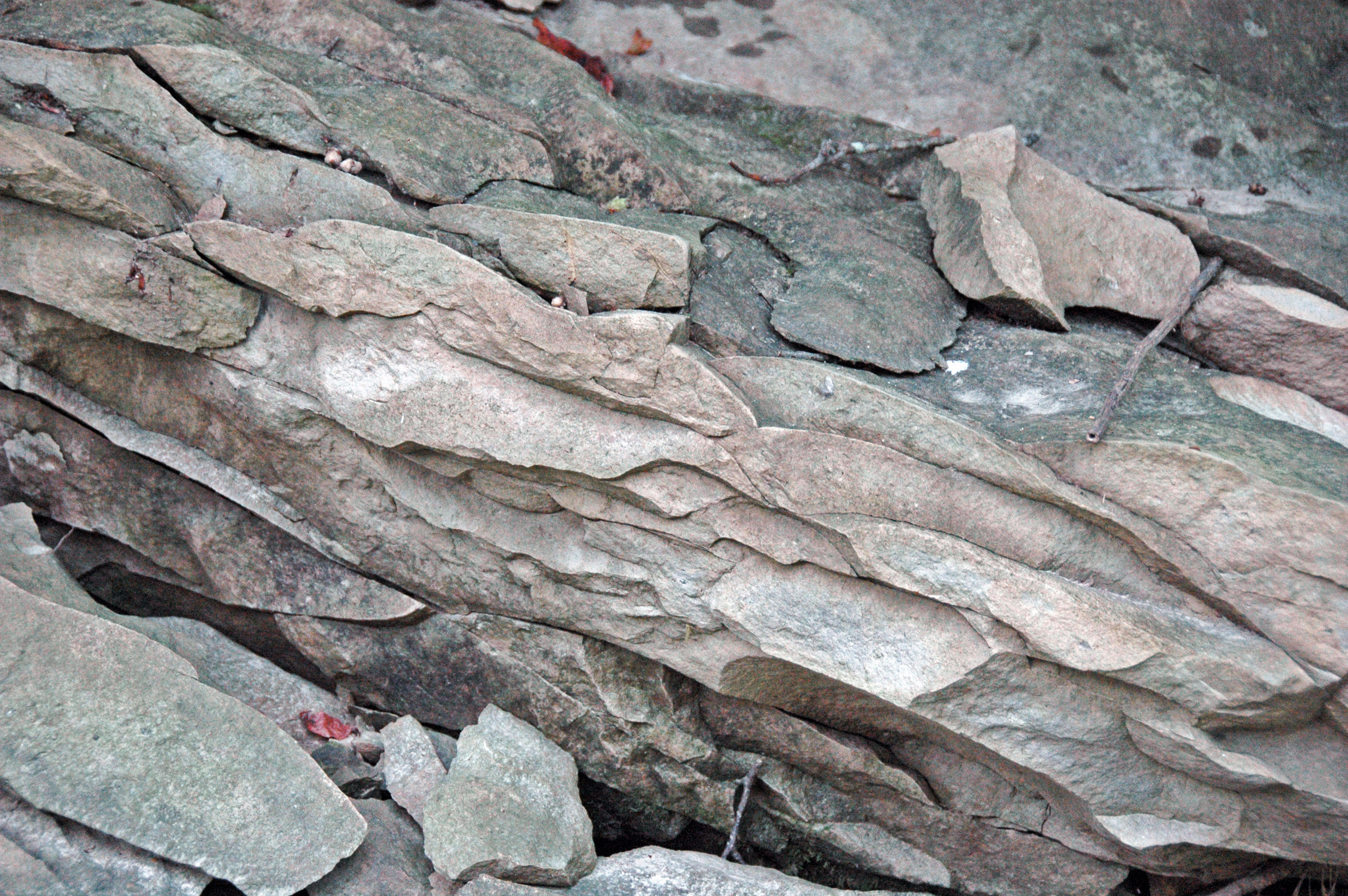
- Maxville Limestone (outcrop near Fultonham, Ohio)
- Type: Formation
- Unit of: Waverly Group
- Overlies: Logan Formation and Rushville Shale

Location
- Region: Ohio
- Country: United States

Type section
- Named for: Maxville, Ohio

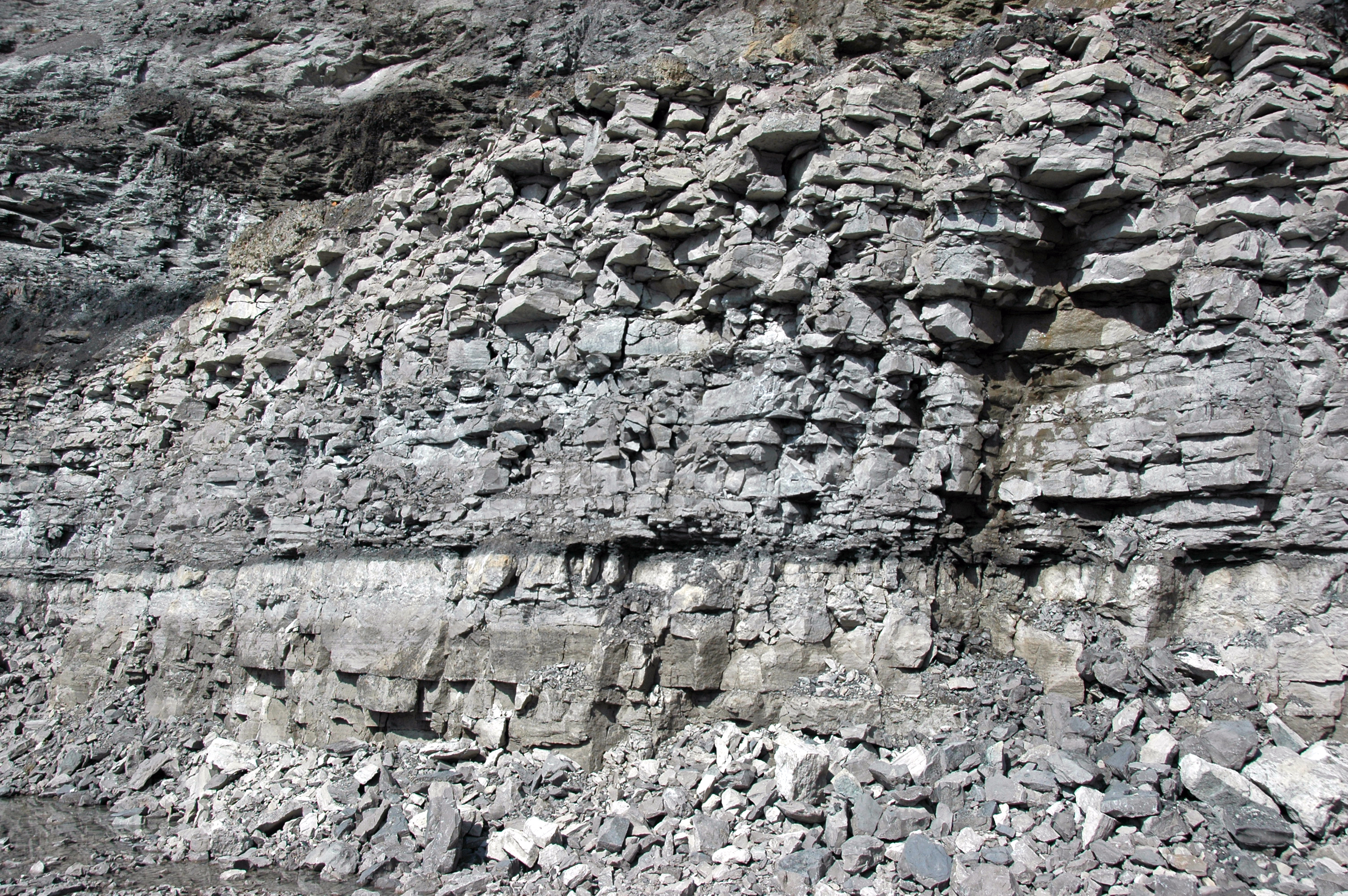
Maxville Limestone (East Fultonham Pit, Muskingum County, Ohio)

The Maxville Limestone is a geologic formation in Ohio. It preserves fossils dating back to the Carboniferous period.

The formation was named after the community of Maxville, Ohio.

== See also ==
- List of fossiliferous stratigraphic units in Ohio
