= Sunbury Shale =

Geologic formation in Michigan, United States

- Stratigraphic range: Tournaisian
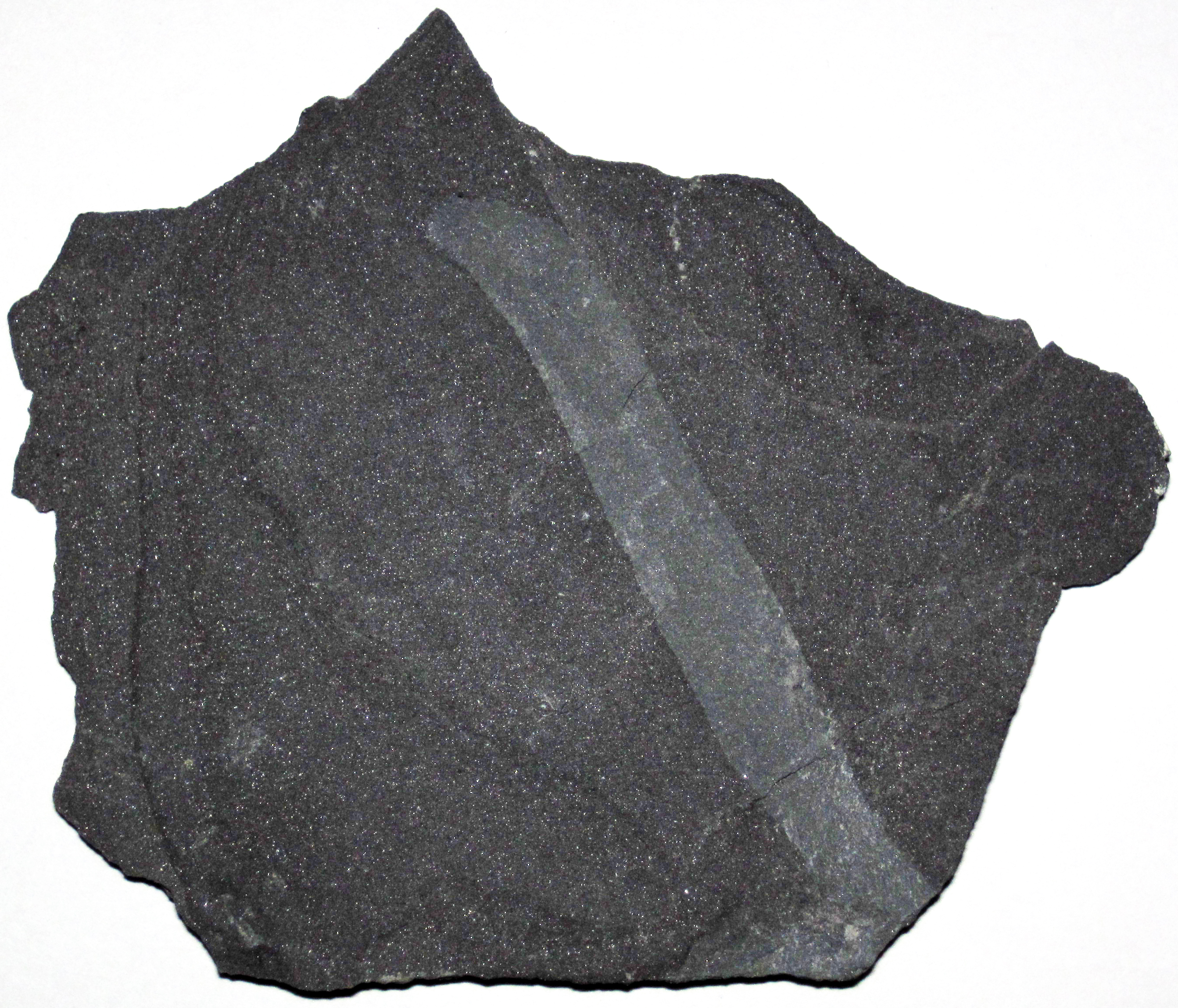
- Sunbury Shale (Reynoldsburg, Ohio)
- Type: Formation
- Unit of: Waverly Group
- Underlies: Coldwater Shale, Cuyahoga Formation, and Price Formation
- Overlies: Berea Sandstone and Ellsworth Shale

Location
- Region: Appalachia, Midwestern United States and Southeastern United States
- Country: United States
- Extent: Michigan, Ohio, Virginia, and West Virginia

The Sunbury Shale is a geologic formation in Michigan. It preserves fossils dating back to the Mississippian period.
