= Logan Formation =

Lower Carboniferous sedimentary formation in West Virginia, United States

- Stratigraphic range: Lower Carboniferous (early Osagean)
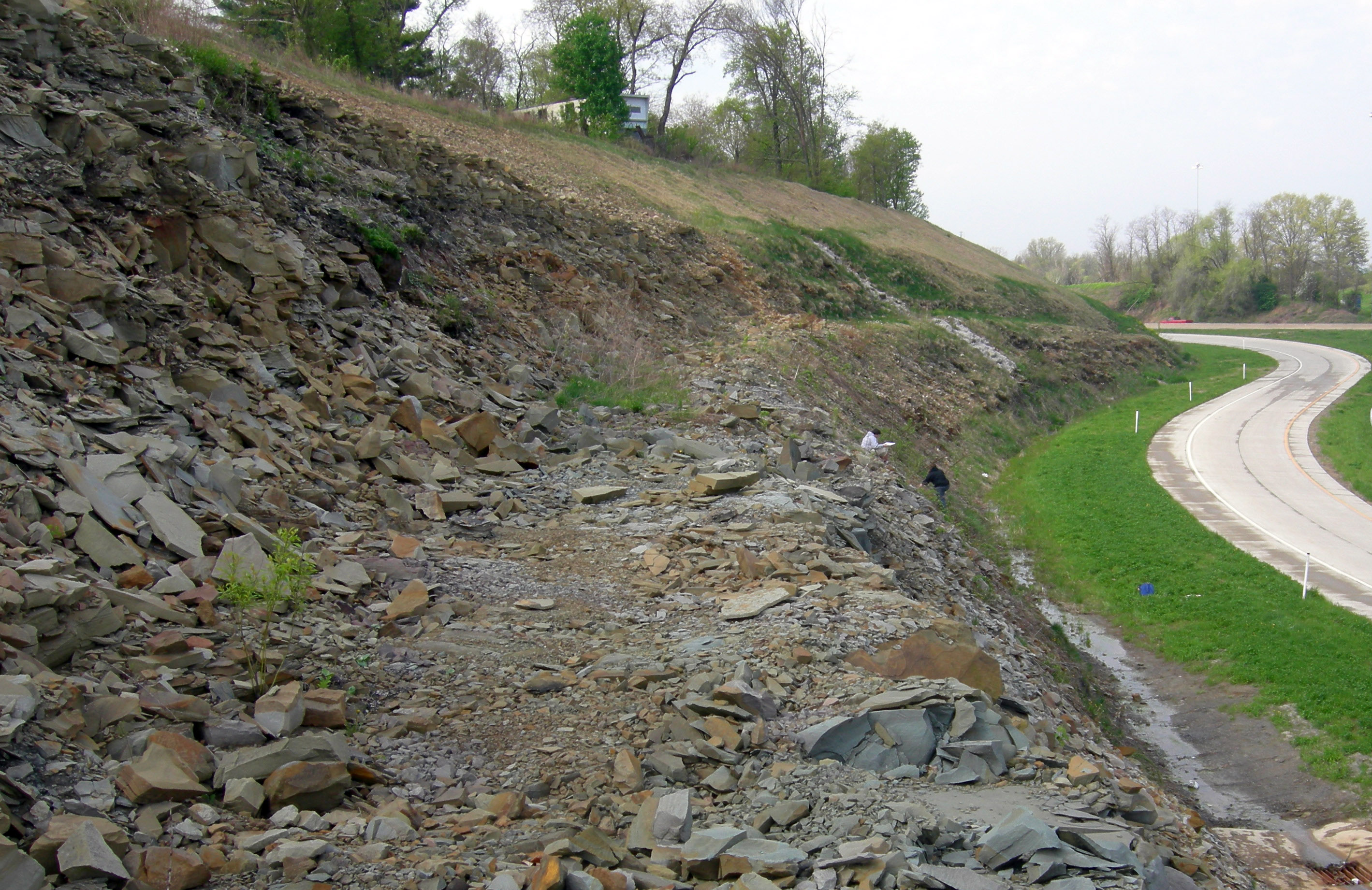
- Logan Formation exposed in Wooster, Ohio.
- Type: Sedimentary
- Unit of: Waverly Group
- Sub-units: Berne, Byer, Allenville, Vinton
- Underlies: Maxville Limestone, Pottsville Group, and Rushville Shale
- Overlies: Cuyahoga Formation; Black Hand Sandstone
- Thickness: 0 to 40 m

Lithology
- Primary: sandstone, siltstone, conglomerate
- Other: shale

Location
- Region: Appalachian Basin
- Country: United States
- Extent: Ohio, West Virginia

Type section
- Named for: Logan, Ohio
- Named by: Andrews, 1870

The Logan Formation is the name given to a Lower Carboniferous (early Osagean) siltstone, sandstone and conglomeratic unit exposed in east-central Ohio and parts of western West Virginia, USA.

== Stratigraphy and paleoenvironment ==
The Logan Formation was named by Andrews (1870) and originally described as a "buff-colored, fine-grained sandstone" above the Waverly Formation and below the Maxville Limestone. Bork and Malcuit (1979) concluded that the Logan Formation was deposited on a shallow marine shelf in a generally transgressing sea. The age of the Logan Formation has been established as early Osagean (Tn3) by the occurrences of brachiopods, ammonoids, conodonts and miospores (Clayton et al., 1998; Matchen and Kammer, 2006).
