= Ellsworth Shale =

Geologic formation in Michigan, United States

- Stratigraphic range: Late Devonian
- Type: Formation
- Underlies: Sunbury Shale
- Overlies: Antrim Shale

Location
- Region: Indiana and Michigan
- Country: United States

The Ellsworth Shale is a geologic formation in Michigan. It preserves fossils dating back to the Devonian period.
