= Cayugan Series =

Geologic Series in Eastern United States

- Stratigraphic range: Gorstian-Přídolí; ~427–419.2 Ma
- Type: Series
- Unit of: Tippecanoe sequence
- Sub-units: Akron Formation, Bertie Formation, Camillus Formation, Syracuse Formation and Vernon Shale
- Underlies: Ulsterian Series
- Overlies: Niagaran Series

Lithology
- Primary: Dolomite, Limestone
- Other: Shale, Halite, Anhydrite, Gypsum

Location
- Region: Indiana; Illinois; Ohio; New York; Pennsylvania; West Virginia; Ontario
- Country: United States; Canada

Type section
- Named for: Cayuga Lake
- Named by: Clarke and Schuchert, 1899

The Cayugan Series contains a number of carbonate, shale and evaporite formations of the upper Silurian System of sedimentary strata in eastern North America. it is a series of carbonates, evaporates and shales that are defined by the shallow restricted marine environmental environment they were deposited in. It was formed during a period of marine transgression, and is near the end of the placid shallow marine environments of the Cambrian through Ordovician periods. The end of the Taconic orogeny marks the beginning of the Cayugan. A number of changes were taking place as the Iapetus Ocean was slowly shrinking. The north end of the sea had already closed. At the end of the Silurian and of the Cayugan Series, the Iapetus Ocean had entirely closed, leaving behind the Iapetus Suture. A result of being closed at one end was that fluctuations in sea level allowed for large parts of the Appalachian and Michigan basins to form large evaporite deposits. All of these deposits are found with in the Salina Group. While the Salina covers an area from New York to Illinois south into Kentucky and Tennessee, the evaporites are primarily found in western New York, western and central Pennsylvania, eastern Ohio and north western West Virginia. As well as in the Michigan Basin.

== Stratigraphy ==
The Cayugan Series represents the Upper Silurian with in the Appalachian Basin. The geological units represented by the Cyaugan Series are at the base of the Salina Group which is subdivided into the Vernon Formation, Syracuse Formation, Camillus and the Bertie Formation. Above the Salina is the Akron Formation making the end of the Silurian and the Cyugan Series.

The Vernon is characterized by its alternating beds of red and green shale. It also contains lenses or beds of dolomite, sandstone and gypsum. In outcrop it reaches six hundred feet in thickness at its maximum.

The Syracuse Formation is above, it is known by its massive salt beds. It also contains anhydrite, gypsum, dolomite, and shale. It also reached a maximum thickness at surface of six hundred feet.

The Camillus is predominately made of red and olive green shales. The shales are massive with bedding being from one to thirty five feet thick. Towards the base there are brown shales and ripple marks. Occasional dolomite as well as anhydrite and gypsum are interbedded throughout with the latter two being very finely interbedded.

The Bertie is made up of dolomitic mudstones as well as common gypsum and anhydrite. It has been noted to contain fossils of Eurypterus remipes.

The Akron is a thin formation about eight feet thick and is made of fine grained dolomite and mudstone.

The above formations are found in New York State, central and western Pennsylvania, eastern Ohio and much of West Virginia. There are equivalents outside this area. The Tonoloway Formation is found in south central Pennsylvania, Maryland and eastern West Virginia. The Wills Creek Formation McKenzie Formation and the undifferentiated Cayuga Limestone in southwestern Virginia.

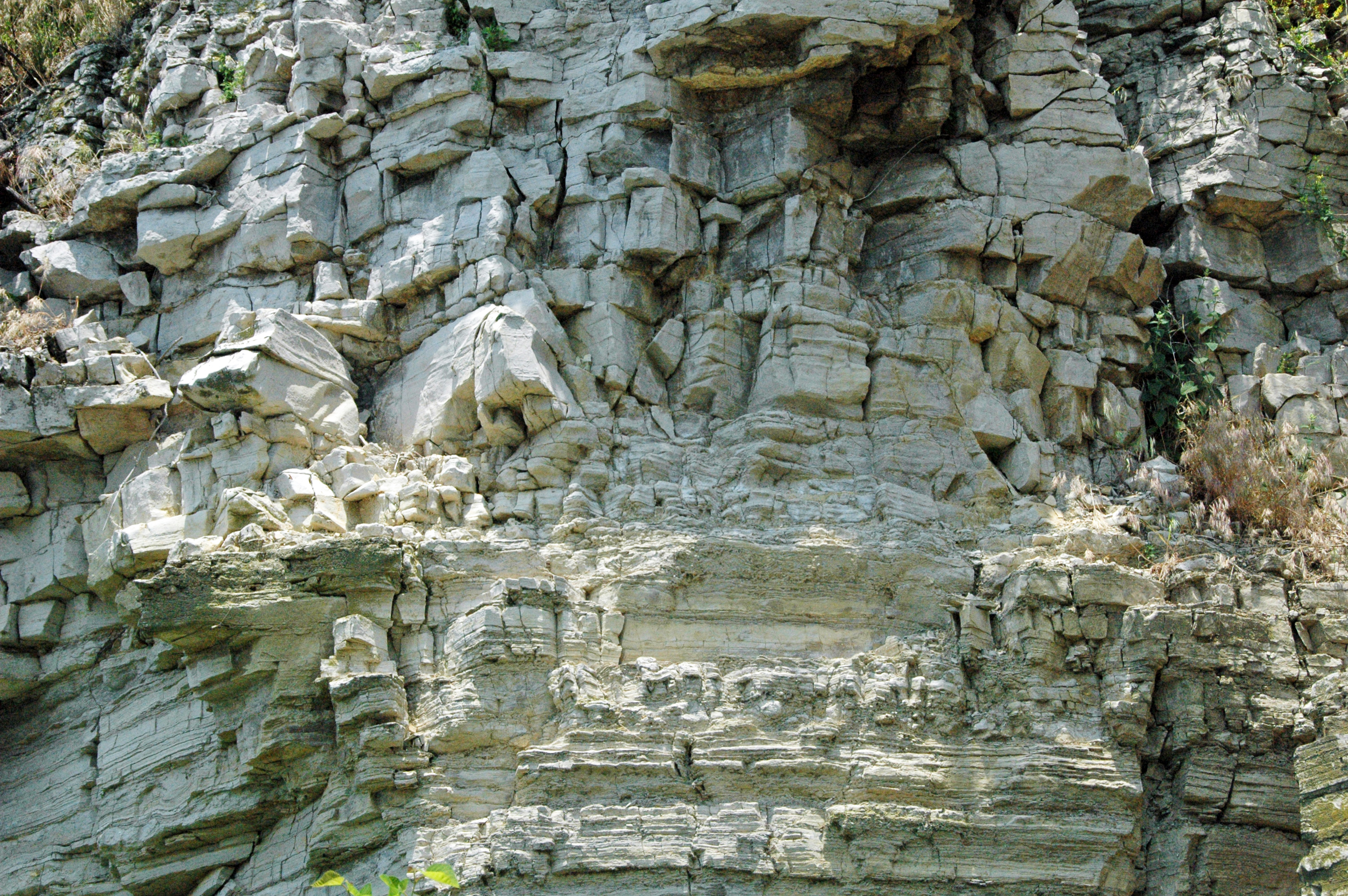
Put-in-Bay Dolomite over Tymochtee Dolomite (Upper Silurian; South Bass Island, Lake Erie, Ohio, USA)

In the Michigan Basin the Cayugan Series includes the Salina Group and the Bass Islands Group. The Salina Group is similar in Michigan to New York, with it being shales in the bottom formations, and rock salt, gypsum, anhydrite interbedded with dolomites and limestones above. The Bass Islands Group is made up of three formations, St. Ignace Dolomite, Put-in-Bay Dolomite, Tymochtee Dolomite.

In Michigan the Bass Islands is made of dolostone with significant amounts of clay minerals. There is anhydrite present in the lower sections of the Bass Islands. Marking the transition for an arid shallow environment to the warm seas of the Devonian

In Pennsylvania the Bass Islands contains the Bertie Formation and the Cobleskill Formation.

In Ohio units of the Bass Islands include the Greenfield Formation, Put-in-Bay Dolomite, Raisin River Dolomite and Tymochtee Dolomite

In West Virginia it has the status of a Formation and in Kentucky it is also has the status of formation in the Hunton Megagroup.

In the Illinois Basin which includes parts of Indiana and Illinois the Salina Group and the lower Bailey Limestone belong to the Cayugan.
