= Eramosa Member =

Stratigraphic unit of the Lockport Formation

Coordinates: 44.6°N 81.1°W

Eramosa (member)
- Stratigraphic range: Silurian; Wenlockian; ~425 Ma
- Type: Member
- Unit of: Lockport Group
- Underlies: Guelph Formation
- Overlies: Goat Island Formation

Lithology
- Primary: Dolomite (rock), Limestone

Location
- Region: New York, Ohio, Pennsylvania, Ontario
- Country: United States, Canada

Type section
- Named for: Eramosa River

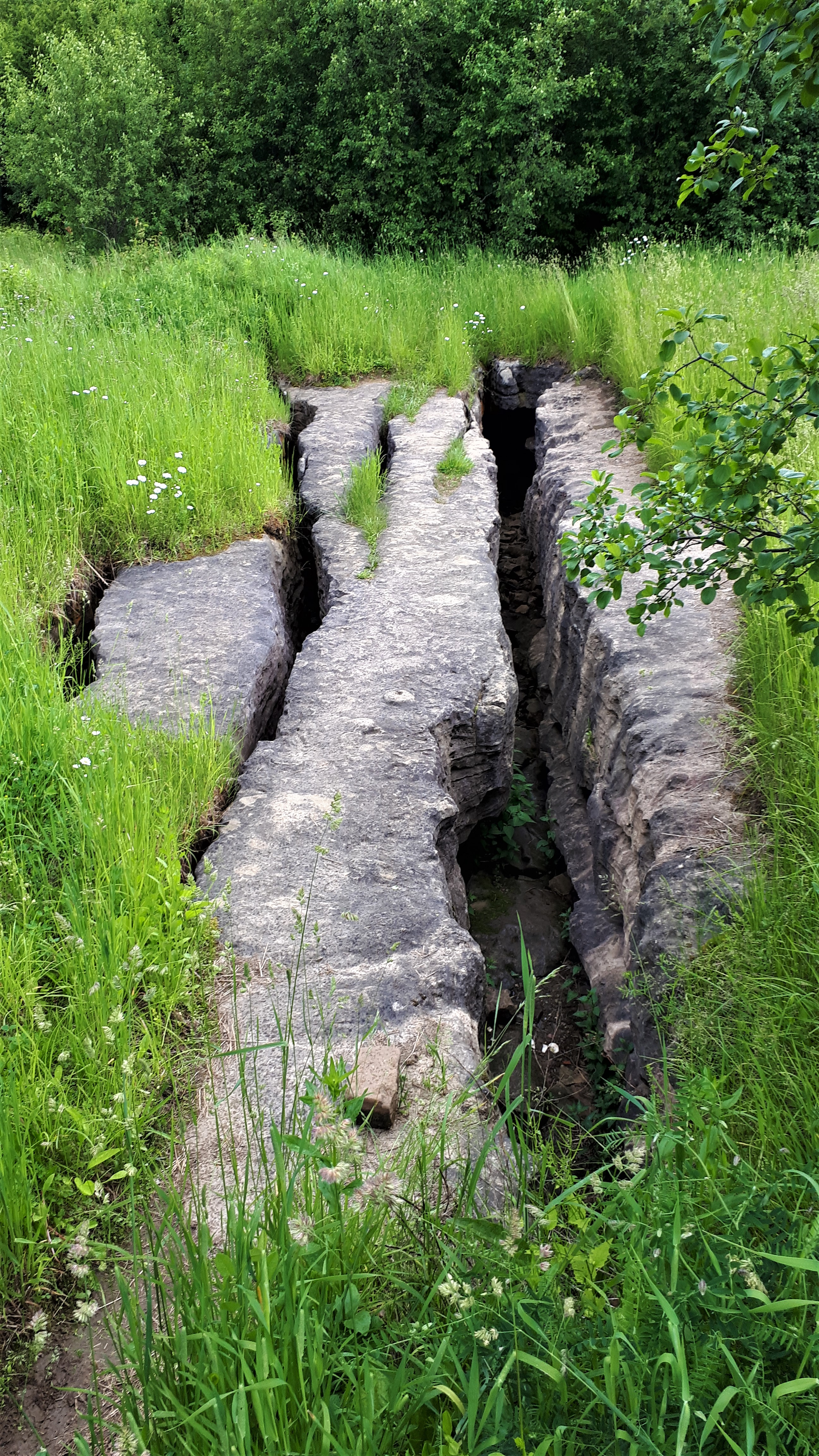
Eramosa Karst Conservation Area- Nexus Cave

The Eramosa Member is a Silurian stratigraphic unit of the Lockport Formation exposed along the Niagara Escarpment in Ontario and western New York State. In the late nineteenth century it was an important source of building stone in Hamilton, Ancaster and Waterdown, and in the late twentieth century quarries in a similar unit, also called the Eramosa, near Wiarton in the Bruce Peninsula, became an important source of dimension stone at a time when most of the other resources of similar stone were depleted. Work in these quarries led to the discovery of exceptionally well preserved fossils (the Eramosa lagerstätte). On the east Mountain at Hamilton, a well-developed cave system was discovered in the Eramosa and has now been designated as the Eramosa Karst Conservation Area.

== Stratigraphy ==
The term was first used for a stratigraphic unit by Williams (1915) who named the Eramosa Member of the Lockport Formation for the bituminous dolomites exposed below the Guelph Formation along the Eramosa River, northeast of Guelph, Ontario. No detailed description of the type section has ever been published, and the status of the unit has been subject to many different interpretations. Until recently, the Eramosa in Ontario was regarded as the highest Member of the Lockport Formation, with gradational contacts with the Goat Island Member (below) and the Guelph Formation (above). In 1995, the US Geological Survey proposed a revised stratigraphy based on studies in the Niagara region. It extended the Lockport to Group status and included, from base to top, the Gasport, Goat Island, Eramosa, and Guelph as Formations within the Lockport Group. In a "reference section" in the Niagara River Gorge, the Eramosa was divided into six "units" recognized throughout the Niagara region, but a shaley lower unit previously named for the Hamilton area (the Vinemount Member) was transferred to the Goat Island Formation. Brunton (2009) has proposed a revision for Ontario which restores the Vinemount Member to the Eramosa and recognizes two other members.

== Age ==
The exact age and correlation of the Eramosa are still uncertain. Conodonts at first indicated that the Eramosa age was Ludlovian (c.420 Ma), but recent studies of both conodonts and the Eramosa lagerstätte suggest an earlier, late Wenlockian (c.425 Ma) age.

== Paleoenvironment ==
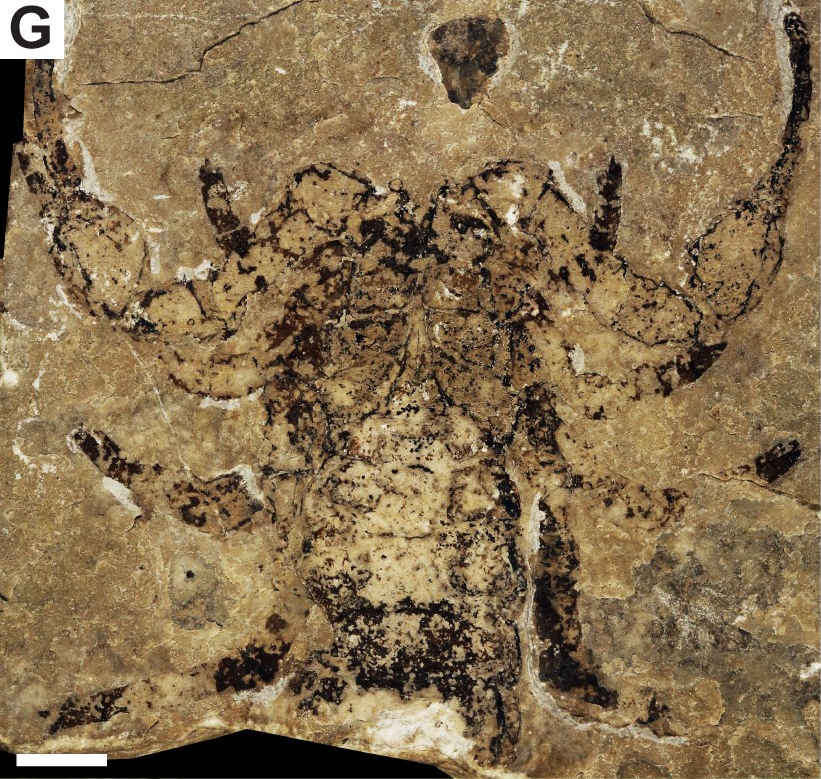
Eramoscorpius, a scorpion from this site likely able to walk on land

The rocks forming the Eramosa are mostly dolomites, but the composition varies from almost pure, grey-weathering, fine-grained dolomite (at Ancaster) to shaley, bituminous, brown-weathering, bioturbated dolomites. Fossils are common at some localities, scarce at others, and chert is generally a minor component. The most characteristic feature is bituminous shaley interbeds. Probably the Eramosa was deposited in several related environments, most likely including shallow, restricted (and poorly oxygenated) marine waters. Among the fossils, perhaps the most spectacular are the eurypterids. Some species lived in fresh or brackish water, but Silurian examples were marine. There also seems to be a fossil arthropod found at the site that shares similarities to Parioscorpio, an enigmatic arthropod known from the Waukesha biota site. In addition, a lobopodian with preserved patterning has been found.

The exceptionally preserved biota are present in a stratum of rock about 8 m thick, which extends for around 16 km (9.9 mi) in the South Bruce Peninsula, Ontario.

So-called "Eramosa marble" is actually a bituminous dolomite (see list).

== See also ==
- List of types of limestone
