= Pridoli =

Pridoli (Přídolí) may refer to:

- Pridoli epoch, part of the Silurian period
- Přídolí, a small town in the southern Czech Republic
- Pridoli (Bajina Bašta), a village in Serbia
