= Eramosa (disambiguation) =

The Eramosa is a Silurian stratigraphic unit (a geological feature) in Ontario, Canada, and western New York State, United States.

Eramosa may also refer to:

- Guelph/Eramosa, Ontario, a township in Wellington County, Ontario, Canada
- Eramosa Karst, an officially designated Area of Natural and Scientific Interest in Stoney Creek, Ontario
- Eramosa marble, a building stone obtained from the Eramosa
- Eramosa River, a river in Wellington County, Ontario
