= Columbus Limestone =

Geologic formation in the United States and Canada

- Stratigraphic range: Devonian
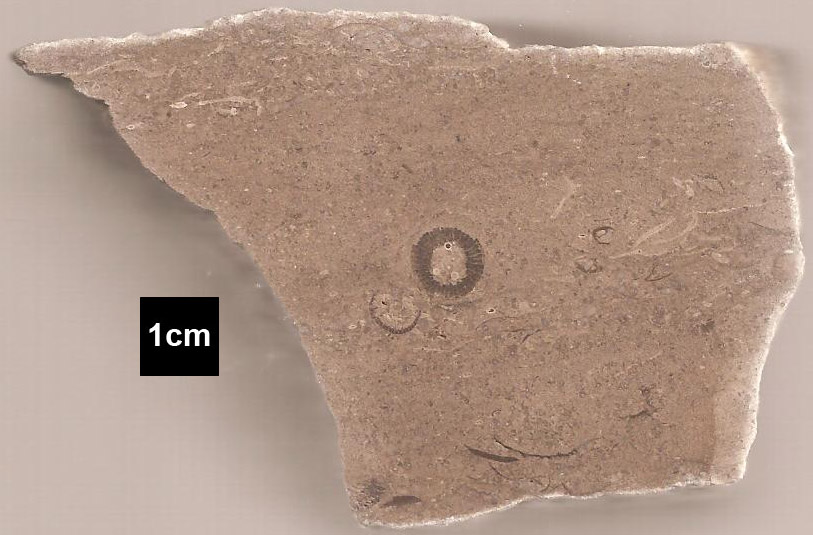
- Etched section of hand sample of Columbus Limestone from Kelleys Island
- Type: Sedimentary
- Unit of: Onondaga Group
- Sub-units: Bellepoint, Marblehead, Tioga Ash Bed, Venice, Delhi, Klondike, East Liberty
- Underlies: Bass Islands Formation, Delaware Formation, and Ohio Shale
- Overlies: Lucas Formation
- Thickness: 0 to 105 feet

Lithology
- Primary: Limestone
- Other: Sandstone

Location
- Region: Cincinnati Arch of North America
- Extent: Ohio, Pennsylvania, Virginia, Ontario

Type section
- Named for: Columbus, Ohio
- Named by: Mathur, 1859

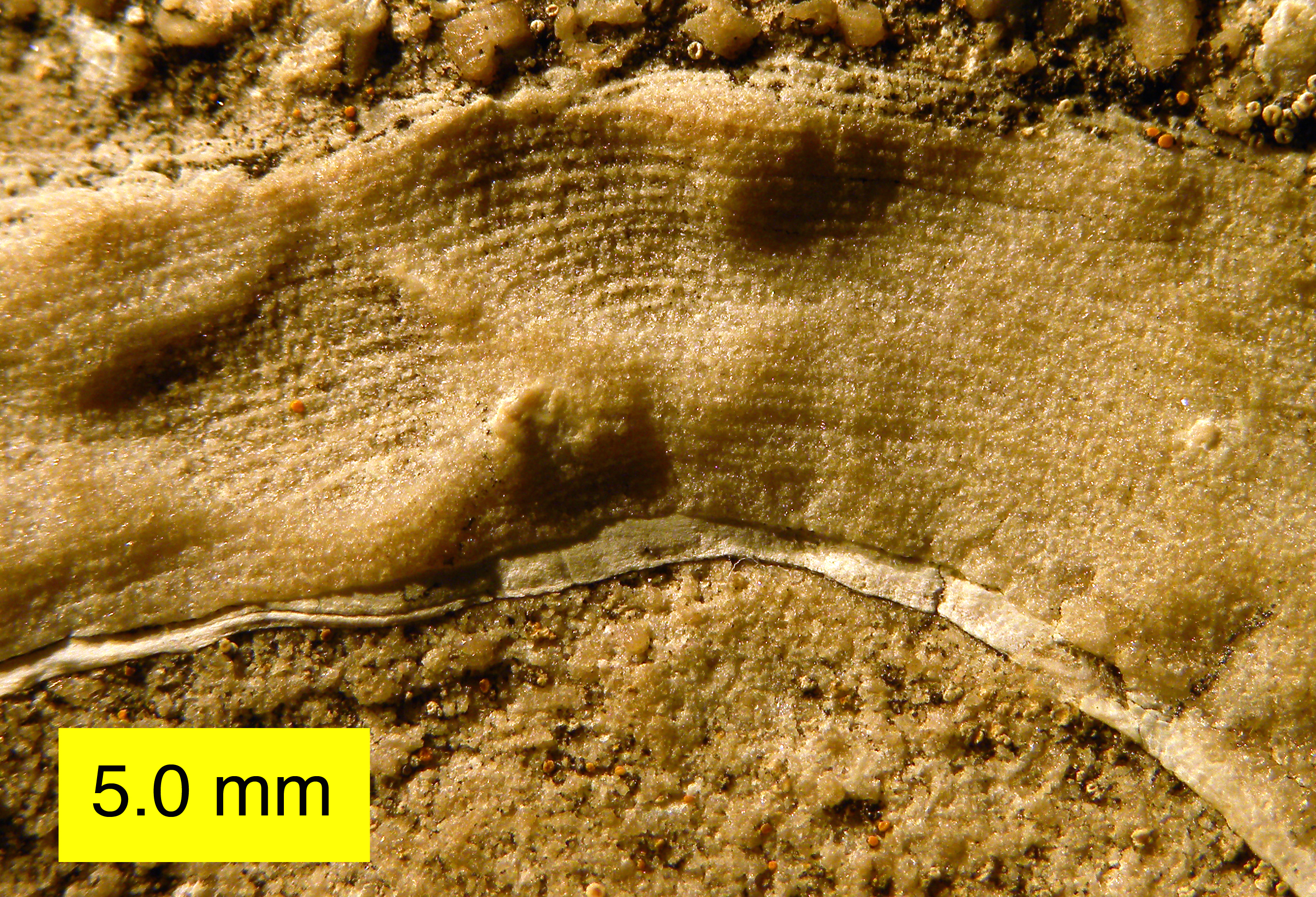
Side view of a stromatoporoid in the Columbus Limestone at Kelleys Island.

The Columbus Limestone is a mapped bedrock unit consisting primarily of fossiliferous limestone. It occurs in Ohio, Pennsylvania, and Virginia in the United States, and in Ontario, Canada.

== Description ==
=== Depositional environment ===
The depositional environment was most likely shallow marine.

=== Stratigraphy ===
The Columbus conformably overlies the Lucas Dolomite in northeastern Ohio, and unconformably overlies other dolomite elsewhere. It unconformably underlies the Ohio Shale in northwestern Ohio and the Delaware Limestone in eastern Ohio.

Its members include: Bellepoint, Marblehead, Tioga Ash Bed, Venice, Delhi, Klondike, and East Liberty.

=== Notable Exposures ===
- The type section is located in Columbus, Ohio.
- The glacial grooves on Kelleys Island are cut into the Columbus Limestone. It is also quarried there.
- An exposure in Ontario is located at Ingersoll, Ontario.

== Fossils ==
The Columbus Limestone contains brachiopods, trilobites, bryozoans, mollusks, corals, stromatoporoids and echinoderms (including crinoids).

Due to their mid-continent depositional environment, the fossils are almost free of deformation caused by tectonic activity common in the Appalachian Mountains.

=== Corals ===
Tabulata
Taxon	Species	Notes
Syringopora	S. tabulata	
Favosites	F. hemispherica minuta	
Emmonsia	E. polymorpha	
Thamnoptychia	T. alternans	
Pleurodictyum	Indeterminate	
Coenites	C. dublinensis	

Rugosa
Taxon	Species	Notes
Prismatophyllum	P. rugosum	
Hexagonaria	H. anna	
Eridophyllum	E. seriale	
Synaptophyllum	S. simcoense	
Amplexus	A. yandelli	
Zaphrenthis	Z. perovalis	
Heterophrentis	H. nitida	
Cystiphylloides	C. americanum	
Odontophyllum	O. convergens	
Siphonophrentis	S. gigantea	
Hadrophyllum	H. dorbignyi	

=== Cephalopods ===
Taxon	Species	Notes
Werneroceras	W. staufferi	Goniatite
Tornoceras	T. eberlei	Goniatite
Goldringia	G. cyclops	

=== Other Invertebrates ===
Taxon	Species	Notes
Spirifer	S. macrothyris	Brachiopod
Brevispirifer	B. gregarius	Brachiopod
Laevidentalhum	L. martinei	Gastropod
Nucleocrinus	N. verneulli	Crinoid

=== Fish ===
Taxon	Species	Notes
Drepanaspidae	Indeterminate	From the East Liberty Member ("East Liberty bone bed")
Cephalaspidae		From the East Liberty Member ("East Liberty bone bed")
Gyracanthus?		From the East Liberty Member ("East Liberty bone bed")
Plectrodus		From the East Liberty Member ("East Liberty bone bed")
Acanthodii		From the East Liberty Member ("East Liberty bone bed")
Machaeracanthus	M. major	From the East Liberty Member ("East Liberty bone bed")
"Acanthoides"	A. dublinensis	From the East Liberty Member ("East Liberty bone bed")
Coccosteus	C. spatulatus	From the East Liberty Member ("East Liberty bone bed")
Ptyctodus		From the East Liberty Member ("East Liberty bone bed")
Rhynchodus		From the East Liberty Member ("East Liberty bone bed")
Palaeomylus		From the East Liberty Member ("East Liberty bone bed")
Cladoselachidae		From the East Liberty Member ("East Liberty bone bed")
Phoebodus		From the East Liberty Member ("East Liberty bone bed")
Onychodus	O. sigmoides	From the East Liberty Member ("East Liberty bone bed")

== Age ==
Relative age dating of the Columbus Limestone places it in the Early to Middle Devonian period.

== Economic Uses ==
The Columbus has been mined for aggregate. Its Calcium carbonate content is 90% or higher.

== See also ==
- List of types of limestone
