= Dundee Limestone =

Geologic formation in Michigan, Ohio and Ontario

- Stratigraphic range: Middle Devonian, 397.5–391.8 Ma
- Type: Formation
- Underlies: Traverse Group, Rogers City Limestone, and Silica Formation
- Overlies: Anderdon Limestone, Detroit River Group, and Lucas Formation
- Thickness: 144.78 metres (475.0 ft)

Lithology
- Primary: limestone, dolomite, chert

Location
- Region: Ontario, Michigan, and Ohio
- Country: United States, Canada

Type section
- Named for: Dundee, Michigan

Dundee Limestone (also referred to as the "Columbus" Limestone) is a geologic formation in Michigan, Ohio and Ontario. It preserves fossils dating back to the Middle Devonian.

== Description ==
The Dundee Limestone is named after Dundee, the area where the original outcrops were found . It is, as the name states, made up of limestones, though the makeup of the limestone change throughout the strata. These are able to be divided into two units. The upper strata of Dundee are made up of medium to course grain limestone and is where most fossils from the limestone are present. The lower strata are made up of sandy dolomite along with limestone and nodular chert.

The limestone represents the Dundee Sea, a shallow sea named after the limestone. There is only a small amount of macrofossils known from the lower Dundee which contrasts the nearby Delaware Limestone. This lack of macrofossils can potentially be attributed to highly saline periods of time. As time went on, there is evidence that a lagoon or another near-shore environment formed, allowing for an influx of fauna.

== Paleobiotia ==
=== Annelida ===
Genus	Species	Notes	Image
Eunicites	E. effusus		
Eunicites	E. euconus		
Eunicites	E. extensus		
Ildraites	I. eminulus		
Marleneites	M. elatus		
Marleneites	M. explicatus		
Nereidavus	N. exploratus		
Paleoenonites	P. editus		
Paleoenonites	P. exsertus		
Staurocephalites	S. eucharis		
Staurocephalites	S. ejectus		

=== Anthozoa ===
Genus	Species	Notes	Image
Favosites	F. "turbinatus"		
Heterophrentis	H. prolifica		
Hexagonaria	H. alternata		
Hexagonaria	H. anna		
Hexagonaria	H. sp. aff. H. coalita		
Hexagonaria	H. parva		
Hexagonaria	H. stewartae		
Hexagonaria	H. tabulata		
Hexagonaria	H. tabulata convexa		
Hexagonaria	H. truncata		
Hexagonaria	H. sp. A aff. H. truncata		
Hexagonaria	H. sp. B aff. H. prisma		

=== Brachiopoda ===
Genus	Species	Notes	Image
Atrypa	A. costata		
Atrypa	A. elegans grabau		
Brachyspirifer	B. lucasensis		
Brachyspirifer	B. manni		
Cyrtospirifer	C. sp. aff. grieri		
Megastrophia	M. sp. aff. hemispherica		
Pholidostronhia	P. nacrea		
Protoleptostrophia	P. perplana		
Rhipidomella	R. variabilis		
Schizophoria	S. folevi		
Spinulicosta	S. spinulicosta		
Stropheodonta	S. sp. aff. demissa		

=== Bryozoa ===
Genus	Species	Notes	Image
Sulcoretepora	S. gilberti		

=== Charophyta ===
Genus	Species	Notes	Image
Trochiliscus	T. bellatulus		

=== Conodonta ===
Genus	Species	Notes	Image
Acodina	A. formosa		
Angulodus	A. walrathi		
Bryantodus	B. mundus		
Hibbardella	H. austinensis		
Hibbardella	H. hawkeyensa		
Hibbardella	H. separata		
Hibbardella	H. triangularis		
Hibbardella	H. n. sp. A		
Hibbardella	H. n. sp. B		
Icriodus	I. angustus		
Icriodus	I. "cymbiformis"		
Icriodus	I. nodosus		
Icriodus	I. sp. aff. I. eslaensi		
Icriodus	I. latericrescens subsp. A		
Icriodus	I. postifexus		
Neoprioniodus	N. alatus		
Neoprioniodus	N. bicuwatus		
Neoprioniodus	N. n. sp.		
Neoprioniodus	N. pronus		
Ozarkodina	O. congesta		
Ozarkodina	O. lata		
Paltodus	P. n. sp.		
Plectospathodus	P. n. sp.		
Polygnathus	P. eiflia		
Polygnathus	P. linguiformis		
Polygnathus	P. robusticostata		
Polygnathus	P. webbi		
Prioniodus	P. aversa		

=== incertae sedis ===
Genus	Species	Notes	Image
Coleolus	C. sp. aff. C. carbonarius		

=== Mollusca ===
Genus	Species	Notes	Image
Conocardium	C. subtrigonale		
Cornellites	C. flabella		
Michelinoceras	M. ohioensis		
Paracydas	P. proavia		
Platyceras	P. carinatum		
Platyceras	P. dumosum		
Platyceras	P. keoughi		
Pleuronotus	P. decewi		

=== Osteichthyes ===
Genus	Species	Notes	Image
Onychodus	O. eriensis		

=== Ostracoda ===
Genus	Species	Notes	Image
Barychilina	B. periptyches		
Dizygopleura	D. compsa		
Hollinella	H. variopapillata		
Keslingolophia	K. chariessa		
Octonaria	O. sp		
Trypetera	T. barathrota		

=== Tentaculitida ===
Genus	Species	Notes	Image
Tentaculites	T. scalariformis		

=== Trilobita ===
Genus	Species	Notes	Image
Basidechenella	B. rowi		
Coronura	C. sp. aff. C. aspectans		
Crassiproetus	C. crassimarginatus		
Dechenella	D. planimarginata		
Phacops	P. rana		
Trypaulites	T. sp. aff. T. calypso		
Viaphacops	V. cristatus		
