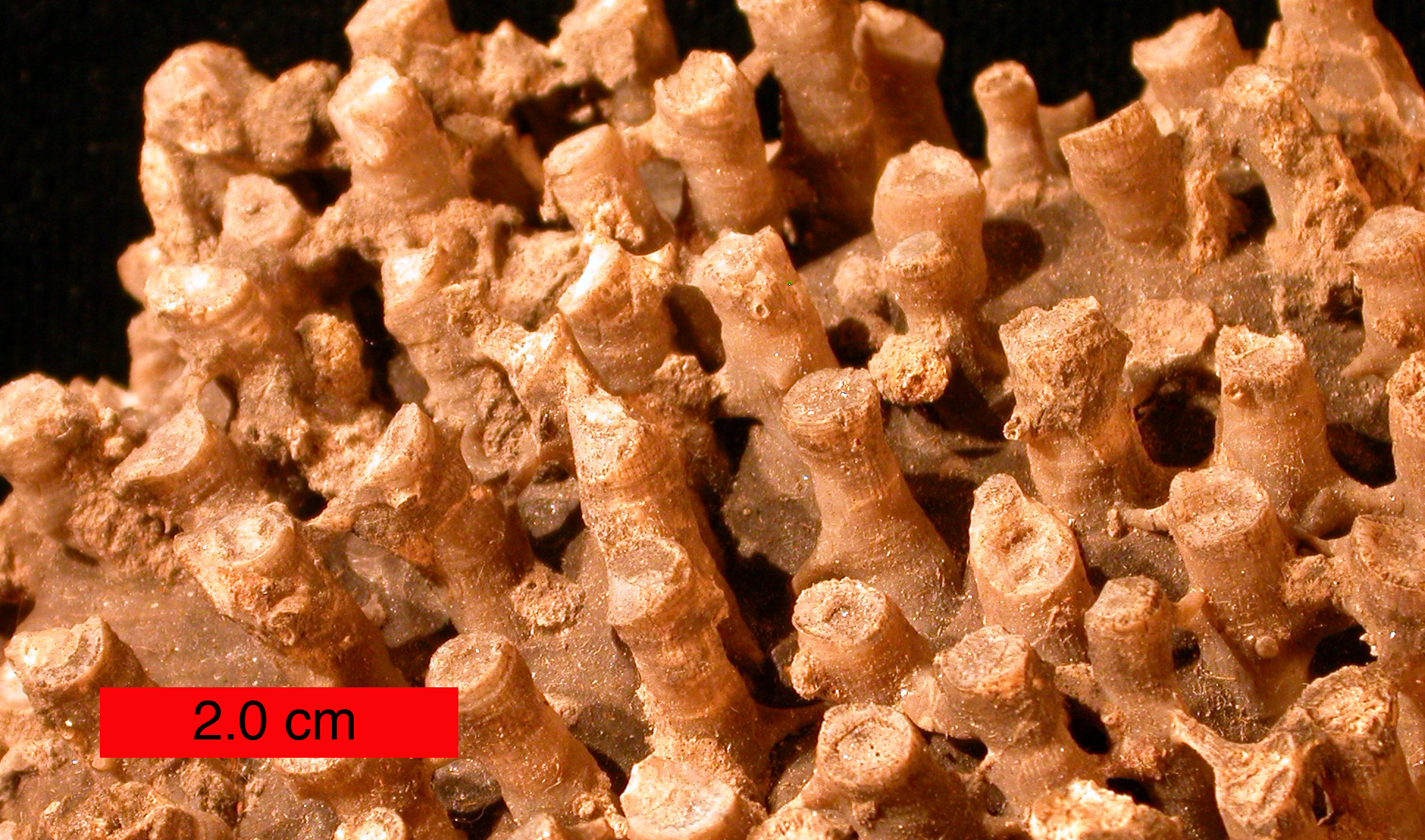
- Syringopora; Boone Limestone (Lower Carboniferous) near Hiwasse, Arkansas.

Scientific classification
- Kingdom: Animalia
- Phylum: Cnidaria
- Subphylum: Anthozoa
- Class: †Tabulata
- Family: †Syringoporidae
- Genus: †Syringopora; Goldfuss 1826

= Syringopora =

Syringopora Temporal range: Ordovician-Permian

Extinct genus of corals

Syringopora is an extinct genus of phaceloid tabulate coral. It has been found in rocks ranging in age from the Ordovician to the Permian, although it was most widespread during the Silurian, Devonian, and Carboniferous periods. Among other places, it has been found in the Columbus Limestone in Ohio, and in the Spring Branch Member of the Lecompton Limestone in Kansas.

== Syringopora ==
Syringopora is an extinct genus of phaceloid Tabulata corals. Fossils have been found in rocks ranging in age from the Ordovician to the Permian, although it was most widespread during the Silurian, Devonian, and Carboniferous periods. Notable fossil localities include the Columbus Limestone in Ohio and the Lecompton Limestone in Kansas.

== Description ==
Syringopora formed colonial structures composed of multiple tubular corallites. The corallites were typically arranged in a honeycomb or phaceloid pattern, a distinctive feature of many tabulate corals. Colonies varied in size and shape, with some forming branching or mound-like structures. As with other Tabulata, Syringopora lacked septa and relied on colonial growth to build reef frameworks.

== Distribution ==
Fossils of Syringopora have been recovered worldwide in marine sedimentary rocks, indicating a broad geographic distribution. Key localities include:

- Columbus Limestone, Ohio, USA
- Lake Michigan, USA
- Spring Branch Member of the Lecompton Limestone, Kansas, USA
- Additional occurrences in Europe and Asia, reflecting its success in Paleozoic shallow seas

== Paleoecology ==
Syringopora lived in warm, shallow marine environments, often forming reef-like colonies that provided habitat for other marine organisms. Its colonial growth patterns suggest it thrived in well-lit, nutrient-rich waters. Like other tabulate corals, Syringopora contributed to reef-building during the Silurian, Devonian, and Carboniferous periods, playing an important role in early marine ecosystems.
