= Holland Quarry Shale =

Geologic formation in Ohio, United States

- Stratigraphic range: Devonian
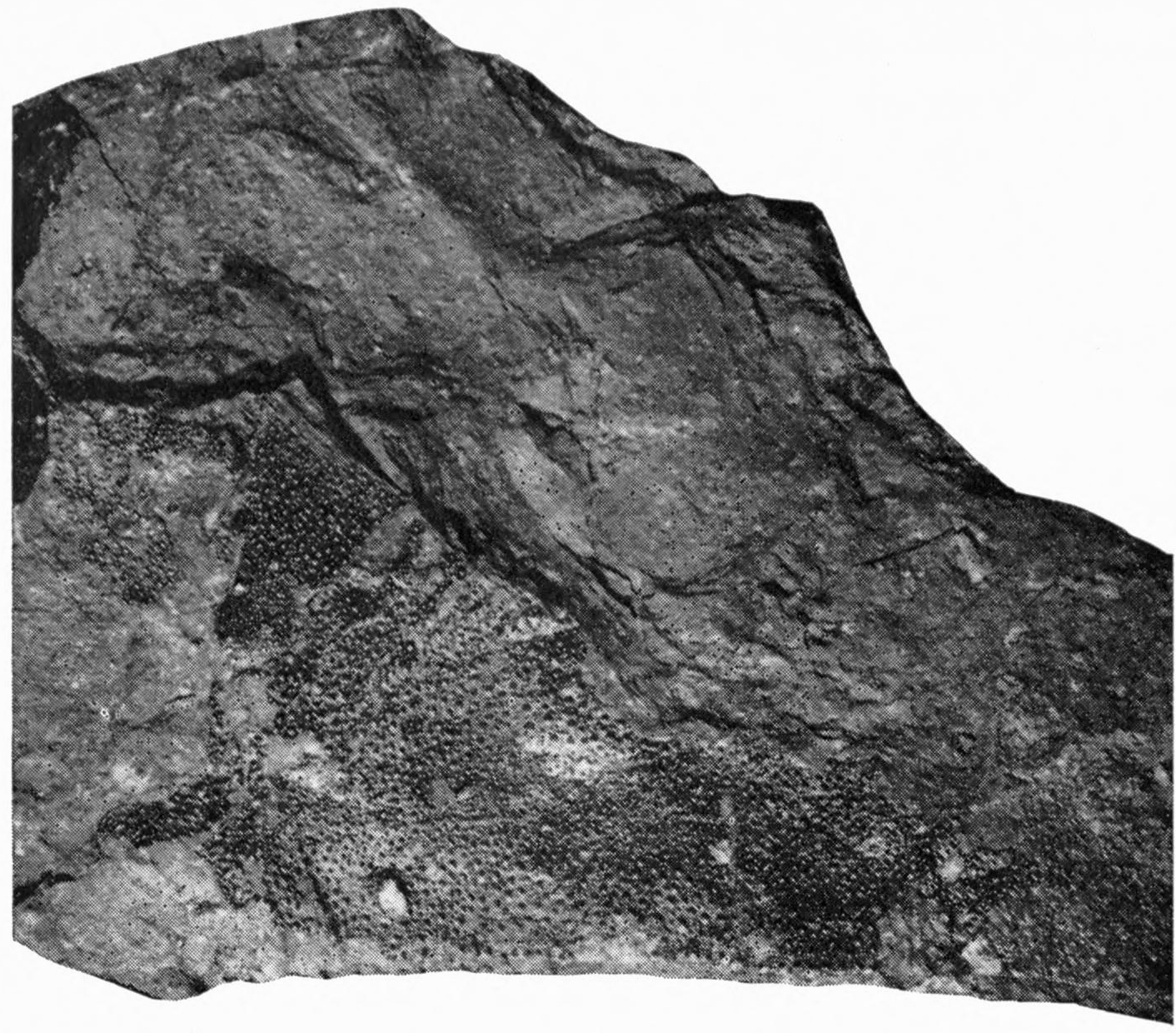
- Eurypterids of the Devonian Holland Quarry Shale
- Type: Formation
- Underlies: Detroit River Group and Sylvania Sandstone

Location
- Region: Ohio
- Country: United States

The Holland Quarry Shale is a geologic formation in Ohio. It preserves fossils dating back to the Devonian period.

== See also ==
- List of fossiliferous stratigraphic units in Ohio
