= Pointe aux Chenes Formation =

Geologic formation in Michigan

- Stratigraphic range: Silurian
- Type: Formation
- Unit of: Salina Group
- Underlies: St. Ignace Dolomite
- Overlies: Bush Bay Formation

Location
- Region: Michigan
- Country: United States

The Pointe aux Chenes Formation is a geologic formation in Michigan, USA. It preserves fossils dating back to the Silurian period.
