= Hillsboro Sandstone =

Geologic formation in Ohio, United States

- Stratigraphic range: Devonian
- Type: Formation
- Underlies: Olentangy Shale
- Overlies: Tymochtee Dolomite

Location
- Country: United States
- Extent: Ohio

The Hillsboro Sandstone is a geologic formation in Ohio. It dates back to the Devonian.
