= Anderdon Limestone =

Geologic formation

- Stratigraphic range: Middle Devonian
- Type: Formation
- Unit of: Detroit River Group
- Underlies: Dundee Limestone
- Overlies: Lucas Formation

Location
- Region: Michigan
- Country: United States

The Anderdon Limestone is a geologic formation in Michigan. It preserves fossils dating back to the Devonian period.
