= Guelph Formation =

Geological formation in New York and in Ontario, Canada

- Stratigraphic range: Silurian
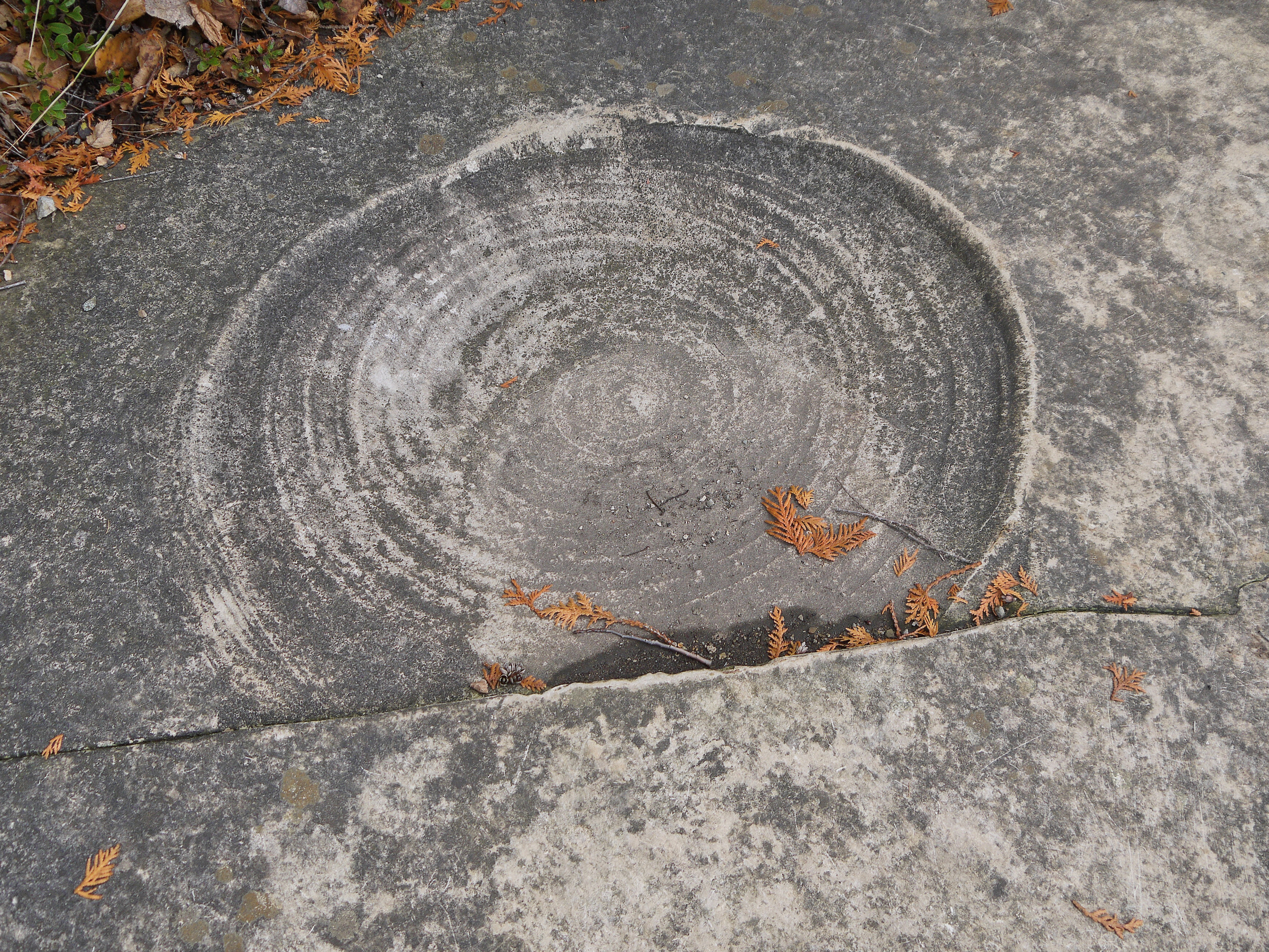
- Stromatolite from the Guelph Formation
- Type: Sedimentary
- Underlies: Vernon, Lockport Group
- Overlies: Eramosa Member
- Thickness: 160 feet

Lithology
- Primary: Dolomite

Location
- Region: New York
- Country: United States

Type section
- Named for: Guelph, Ontario
- Named by: William Edmond Logan

The Guelph Formation is a geologic formation in New York and in Ontario, Canada. It preserves fossils dating back to the Silurian period.

== Fossils ==
Fossils within the formation include:

- Pentamerus occidentalis (Hall)
- Megalomus canadensis (Hall)
- Murchisonia bivittata (Hall)
- M. macrospira (Hall)
- M. boydii (Hall)
- M. logani
- M. longispira
- M. uvittata
- M. turritiformis
- M. tullia
- Subulites ventricosus (Hall)
- Pleurotomaria solaroides (Hall)
- P. elora (Billings)
- P. galtensis (Billings)
- P. mora
- Cyclonema sulcata (Hall)
- C. galtensis
- C. thysbe
- C. psyche
- C. depressa
- Holopea guelphensis (Billings)
- Bellerophon angustata (Hall)
- Favosites gothlandica
- F. polymorpha
- Halysites catenulatus
- Columnaria galtensis
- Obolus sp.
- Orikoceras sp.
- Orthoceras darwini
- Cyrtoceras arcticameratum
- C. Jonesi
- Phragmoceras hector
- Calymene blumenbachii
- Diphyphyllum irregulare
- Amplexus laxatus
- Rhynchonella sp.
- Athyris sp.
