= Olentangy Shale =

Geologic formation in Ohio

- Stratigraphic range: Late Devonian
- Type: Formation
- Underlies: Ohio Shale
- Overlies: Hillsboro Sandstone and Tymochtee Dolomite

Location
- Region: Ohio
- Country: United States

The Olentangy Shale is a geologic formation in Ohio. It preserves fossils dating back to the Devonian period.

== See also ==
- List of fossiliferous stratigraphic units in Ohio
