= Rapson Creek Formation =

Geologic formation in Michigan

- Stratigraphic range: Silurian
- Type: Formation
- Unit of: Engadine Group
- Underlies: Bush Bay Formation
- Overlies: Rockview Formation

Location
- Region: Michigan
- Country: United States

The Rapson Creek Formation is a geologic formation in Michigan. It preserves fossils dating back to the Silurian period.
