= Garden Island Formation =

Geologic formation in Michigan

- Stratigraphic range: Early Devonian
- Type: Formation
- Underlies: Bois Blanc Formation
- Overlies: Raisin River Dolomite

Location
- Region: Michigan
- Country: United States

The Garden Island Formation is a geologic formation in Michigan. It preserves fossils dating back to the Devonian period.
