= Cordell Formation =

Geologic formation in Michigan

- Stratigraphic range: Silurian
- Type: Formation
- Unit of: Manistique Group
- Underlies: Rockview Formation
- Overlies: Schoolcraft Formation

Location
- Region: Michigan
- Country: United States

The Cordell Formation is a geologic formation in Michigan. It preserves fossils dating back to the Silurian period.
