= Lime Island Formation =

Geologic formation in Michigan, United States

- Stratigraphic range: Silurian
- Type: Formation
- Unit of: Burnt Bluff Group
- Underlies: Byron Formation
- Overlies: Cabot Head Shale

Location
- Region: Michigan
- Country: United States

The Lime Island Formation is a geologic formation in Michigan. It preserves fossils dating back to the Silurian period.

== See also ==
- List of fossiliferous stratigraphic units in Michigan
