= Bois Blanc Formation =

Geologic formation in Michigan

- Stratigraphic range: Middle Devonian
- Type: Formation
- Underlies: Onondaga Limestone and Sylvania Sandstone
- Overlies: Garden Island Formation and Oriskany Sandstone

Location
- Region: Michigan and Ohio
- Country: United States

The Bois Blanc Formation is a geologic formation in Michigan. It preserves fossils dating back to the Devonian period.
