= Raisin River Dolomite =

Geologic formation in Michigan, United States

- Stratigraphic range: Silurian
- Type: Formation
- Unit of: Bass Islands Group
- Underlies: Garden Island Formation
- Overlies: Put-in-Bay Dolomite

Location
- Region: Michigan
- Country: United States

The Raisin River Dolomite is a geologic formation in Michigan. It preserves fossils dating back to the Silurian period.
