= Rockview Formation =

Geologic formation in Michigan

Cordell Formation
- Stratigraphic range: Silurian
- Type: Formation
- Unit of: Engadine Group
- Underlies: Rapson Creek Formation
- Overlies: Cordell Formation

Location
- Region: Michigan
- Country: United States

The Rockview Formation is a geologic formation in Michigan. It preserves fossils dating back to the Silurian period.
