= Byron Formation =

Geologic formation in Michigan and Wisconsin, United States

- Stratigraphic range: Silurian
- Type: Formation
- Unit of: Burnt Bluff Group
- Underlies: Hendricks Formation
- Overlies: Lime Island Formation

Location
- Region: Michigan and Wisconsin
- Country: United States

The Byron Formation is a geologic formation in Michigan and Wisconsin. It preserves fossils dating back to the Silurian period.

== See also ==
- List of fossiliferous stratigraphic units in Wisconsin
- Paleontology in Michigan
- Paleontology in Wisconsin
