= Sylvania Sandstone =

Geologic formation in Michigan and Ohio

- Stratigraphic range: Middle Devonian
- Type: Formation
- Unit of: Detroit River Group
- Underlies: Amherstburg Formation
- Overlies: Bois Blanc Formation

Location
- Region: Michigan and Ohio
- Country: United States

The Sylvania Sandstone is a geologic formation in Ohio and Michigan. Its type locality is Sylvania, Ohio. It preserves fossils dating back to the Devonian period.

== See also ==
- List of fossiliferous stratigraphic units in Ohio
