= Silica Formation =

Geologic formation in Michigan

- Stratigraphic range: Devonian
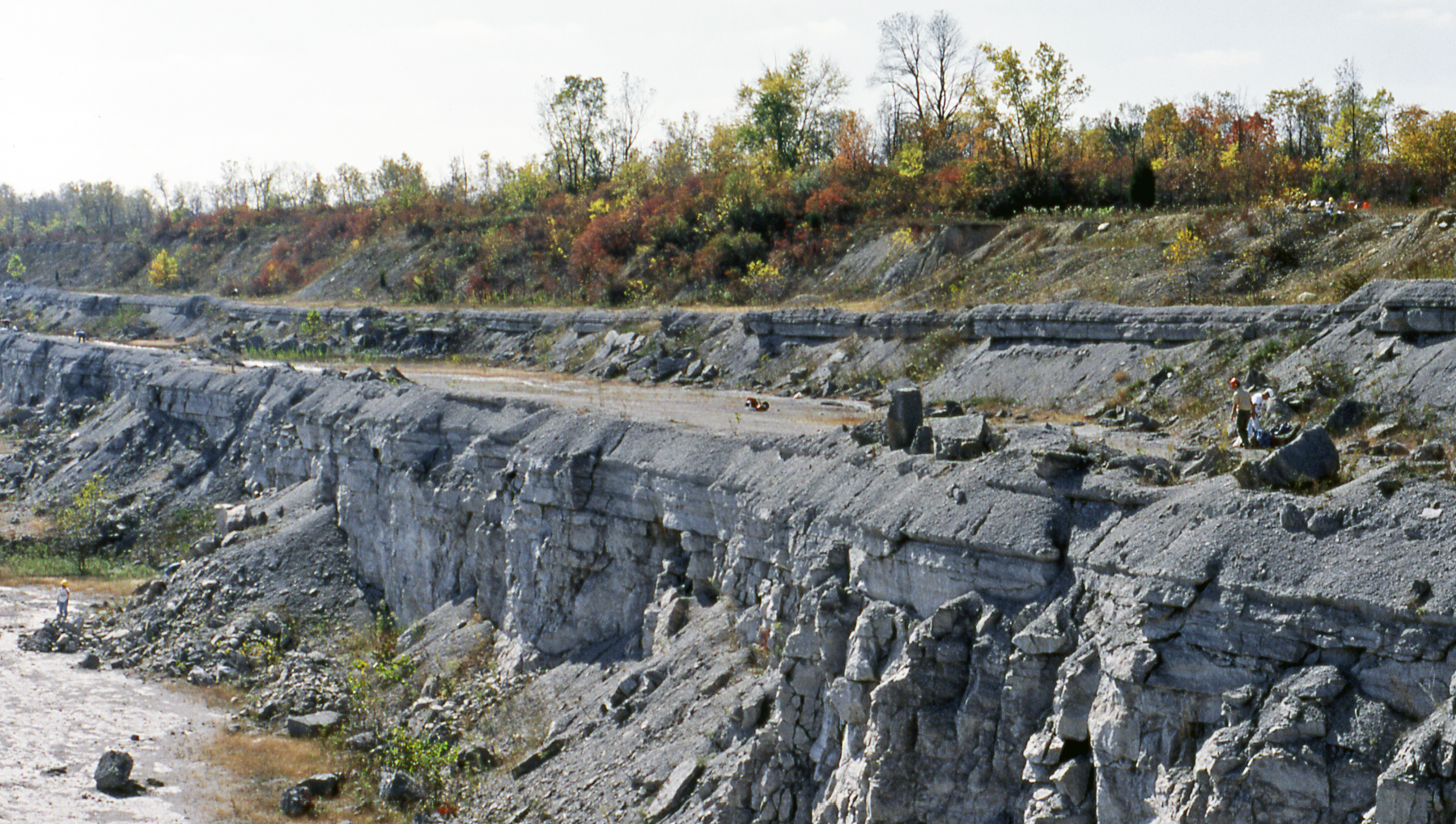
- Silica Formation (Quarry in Lucas County, Ohio)
- Type: Formation
- Underlies: Tenmile Creek Dolomite
- Overlies: Dundee Limestone

Location
- Region: Michigan and Ohio
- Country: United States

The Silica Formation is a geologic formation in Michigan. It preserves fossils dating back to the Devonian period.
