= Amherstburg Formation =

Geologic formation in Ontario, Canada and Michigan, USA

- Stratigraphic range: Middle Devonian
- Type: Formation
- Unit of: Detroit River Group
- Underlies: Lucas Formation
- Overlies: Sylvania Sandstone

Location
- Region: Michigan, Ohio, and Ontario
- Country: Canada and United States

The Amherstburg Formation is a geologic formation in Ontario, Canada and Michigan, United States. It preserves fossils dating back to the Devonian period.

== See also ==
- List of fossiliferous stratigraphic units in Ontario
