= Lucas Formation =

Geologic formation in Michigan

- Stratigraphic range: Middle Devonian
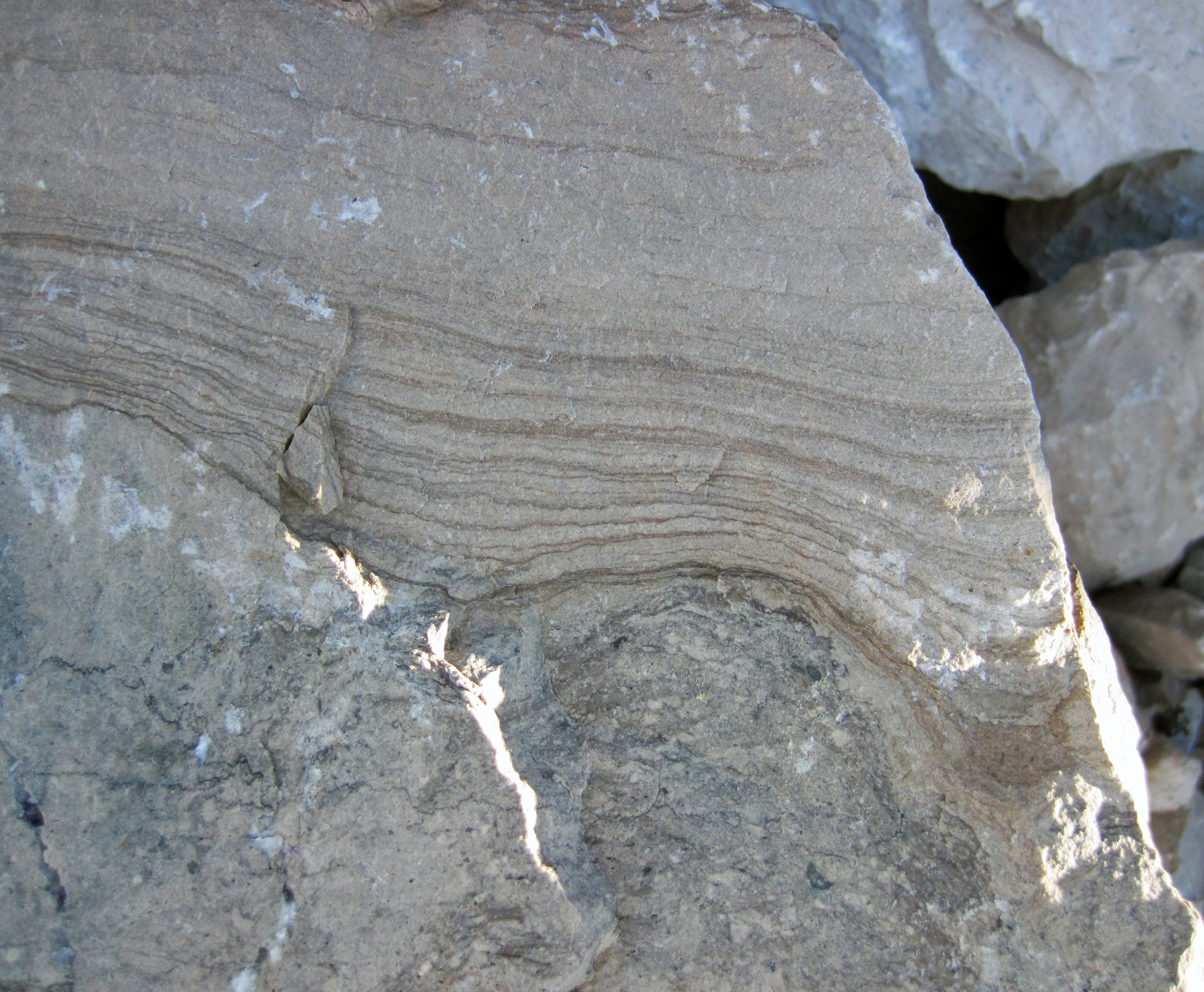
- Lucas Dolomite (Middle Devonian; quarry near Junction, Ohio)
- Type: Formation
- Unit of: Detroit River Group
- Underlies: Anderdon Limestone and Dundee Formation
- Overlies: Amherstburg Formation

Location
- Region: Michigan and Ohio
- Country: United States

The Lucas Formation is a geologic formation in U.S. states of Michigan and Ohio. It preserves fossils dating back to the middle Devonian period.

== Fossil content ==
Cnidarians
| Genus | Species | Presence | Material | Notes | Images |
|---|---|---|---|---|---|
| Siphonophrentis | S. gigantea | | | A coral | |
