= Delaware Limestone =

Geologic formation in Ohio, United States

- Stratigraphic range: Devonian
- Type: Formation
- Underlies: Olentangy Shale and Plum Brook Shale
- Overlies: Columbus Limestone

Location
- Country: United States
- Extent: Ohio

The Delaware Limestone is a geologic formation in Ohio. It dates back to the Devonian.
