= Schoolcraft Formation =

Geological formation in Michigan, USA

- Stratigraphic range: Silurian
- Type: Formation
- Unit of: Manistique Group
- Underlies: Cordell Formation
- Overlies: Hendricks Formation

Location
- Region: Michigan
- Country: United States

The Schoolcraft Formation is a geologic formation in Michigan. It preserves fossils dating back to the Silurian period.
