= Gasport Formation =

Geologic formation in the United States and Canada

- Stratigraphic range: Sheinwoodian; ~433-432 Ma
- Type: Formation
- Unit of: Lockport Group
- Sub-units: Pekin Member; Gothic Hill Member
- Underlies: Goat Island Formation
- Overlies: Clinton Group

Lithology
- Primary: Limestone, Dolomite
- Other: Chert

Location
- Region: New York, Ohio, Pennsylvania, West Virginia, Ontario
- Country: United States, Canada

Type section
- Named for: Gasport, New York
- Named by: Brett C.E.

The Gasport Formation is a geologic formation in the Appalachian Basin and Michigan Basin. This is one of the reef formations separating the Appalachian Basin from the Michigan Basin and the Ohio Basin. It is a part of the Lockport Group of carbonates. It is the lowest and oldest formation within the Lockport. The Gasport is found in Michigan, New York, Ohio, and Pennsylvania. Outcrops are limited to the area around the Great Lakes. It is part of a large reef structure dating back to the Silurian period. Being part of the Lockport Group it is a feature of the Niagara Escarpment.

== Description ==
The Gasport represents a period of reef building with the upper Pekin Member containing large stromatolite structures. The lower Gothic Hill Member contains bryozoans, corals, and crinoids. The upper Pekin Member is a dark grey argillaceous limestone. The texture of the member tends to be grainstone to wackestone. Bioherms are common throughout this member. Many large structures can be observed in outcrops and quarries up to 25 feet tall and 100 eet in length. At its base there is an erosional disconformity contact with the underlying Clinton Group.
