= Hendricks Formation =

Geologic formation in Michigan

- Stratigraphic range: Silurian
- Type: Formation
- Unit of: Burnt Bluff Group
- Sub-units: Fiborn Limestone
- Underlies: Schoolcraft Formation
- Overlies: Byron Formation

Location
- Region: Michigan and Wisconsin
- Country: United States

The Hendricks Formation is a geologic formation in Michigan. It preserves fossils dating back to the Silurian period.
