= Bush Bay Formation =

Geologic formation in Michigan

- Stratigraphic range: Silurian
- Type: Formation
- Unit of: Engadine Group
- Underlies: Pointe aux Chenes Formation
- Overlies: Rapson Creek Formation

Location
- Region: Michigan
- Country: United States

The Bush Bay Formation is a geologic formation in Michigan. It preserves fossils dating back to the Silurian period.

== Bibliography ==
- Various Contributors to the Paleobiology Database. "Fossilworks: Gateway to the Paleobiology Database".
