= Put-in-Bay Dolomite =

Geologic formation in Michigan and Ohio

- Stratigraphic range: Silurian
- Type: Formation
- Unit of: Bass Islands Group
- Underlies: Raisin River Dolomite
- Overlies: St. Ignace Dolomite

Location
- Region: Michigan
- Country: United States

The Put-in-Bay Dolomite is a geologic formation in Michigan and Ohio. It preserves fossils dating back to the Silurian period. The type locality is South Bass Island in western Lake Erie.
