= Eramosa Karst =

Karst in Stoney Creek, Ontario, Canada

Eramosa Karst Conservation Area
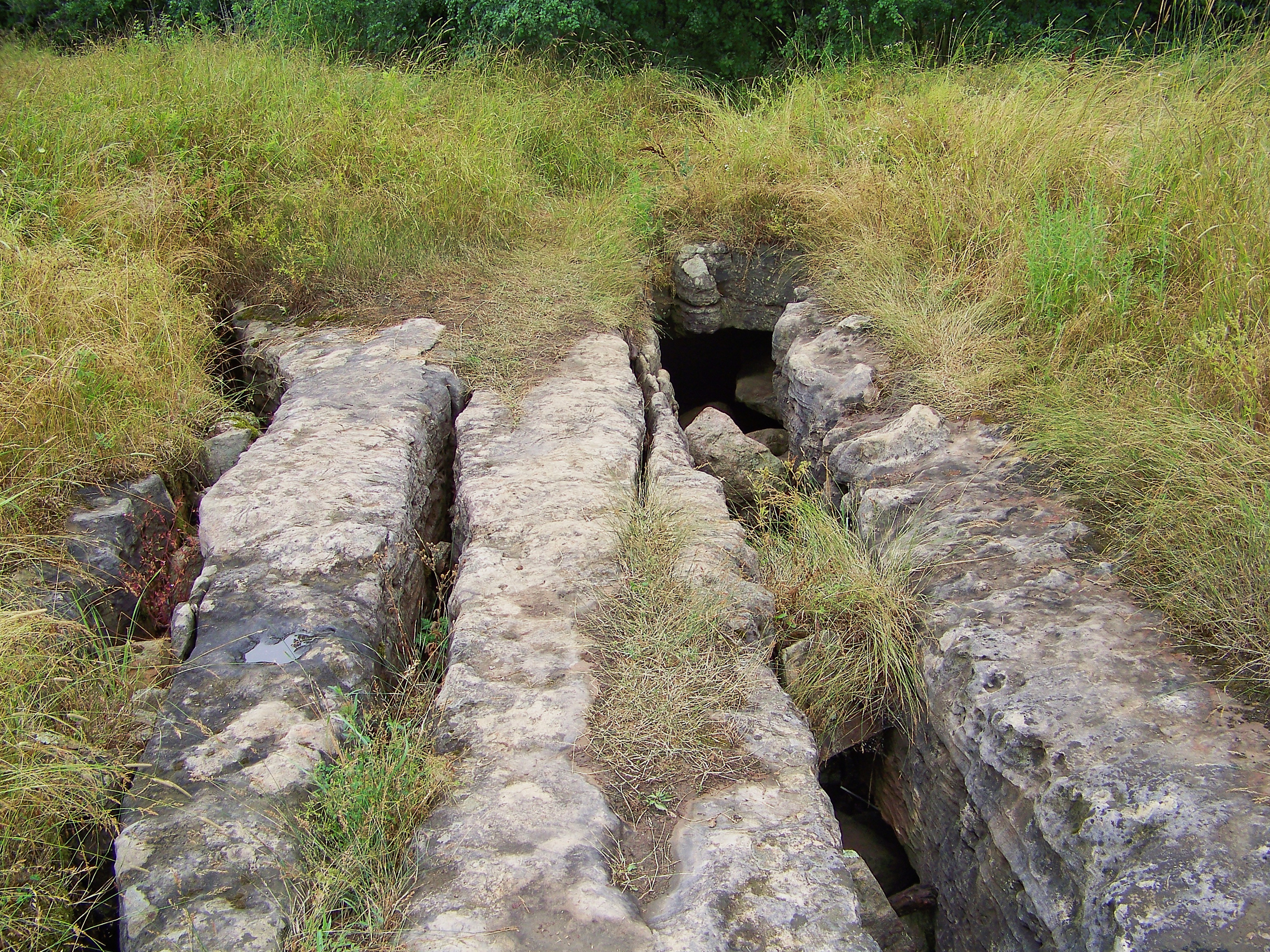
- Entrance of Nexus Cave.
- Interactive map of Eramosa Karst Conservation Area
- Location: Canada
- Nearest city: Hamilton, Ontario
- Coordinates: 43°11′9″N 79°48′27″W
- Area: 78 ha (190 acres)
- Established: 2008
- Governing body: Hamilton Conservation Authority

The Eramosa Karst is a provincially significant Earth Science Area of Natural and Scientific Interest in Ontario, Canada, located in Stoney Creek, a constituent community of the City of Hamilton, and immediately south of the Niagara Escarpment.

It exhibits sixteen different karstic geological features, of which seven are provincially significant, and is considered to be the best example of karst topography found in Ontario. The area is composed of parcels of land that are provincially, municipally and privately owned. It received ANSI-ES designation on February 13, 2003.

== Conservation area ==
In October 2006, Ontario donated 73 ha of land to the Hamilton Conservation Authority to create a new conservation area, followed by another donation of 3.1 ha in April 2007. The City of Hamilton has also contributed in June 2007 by transferring 1.6 ha. The area opened to the public on June 20, 2008.

== Landform ==
The area is crossed by the Eramosa Escarpment. It is morphologically similar to the Niagara Escarpment, as both are composed of dolomites of the Lockport Formation. However, the Eramosa Escarpment is much smaller in height (no more than 10 metres); its crest is only occasionally defined by cliffs, which are no higher than 3 metres. Most of the bedrock is buried by till.

The area exhibits a great concentration of various karstic features.

=== Soil pipes ===
These tubular cavities, a few millimetres to a few centimetres in diameter, conduct water from the surface to the karst bedrock below.

=== Dolines ===
Dolines (or sinkholes) are mostly found in its suffusion form. Suffusion dolines are depressions formed above caves and smaller cavities in unconsolidated sediments. Many dolines in the Eramosa Karst are formed by a combination of soil piping and erosion of the glacially deposited sediments, overlying the bedrock.

=== Karst windows ===
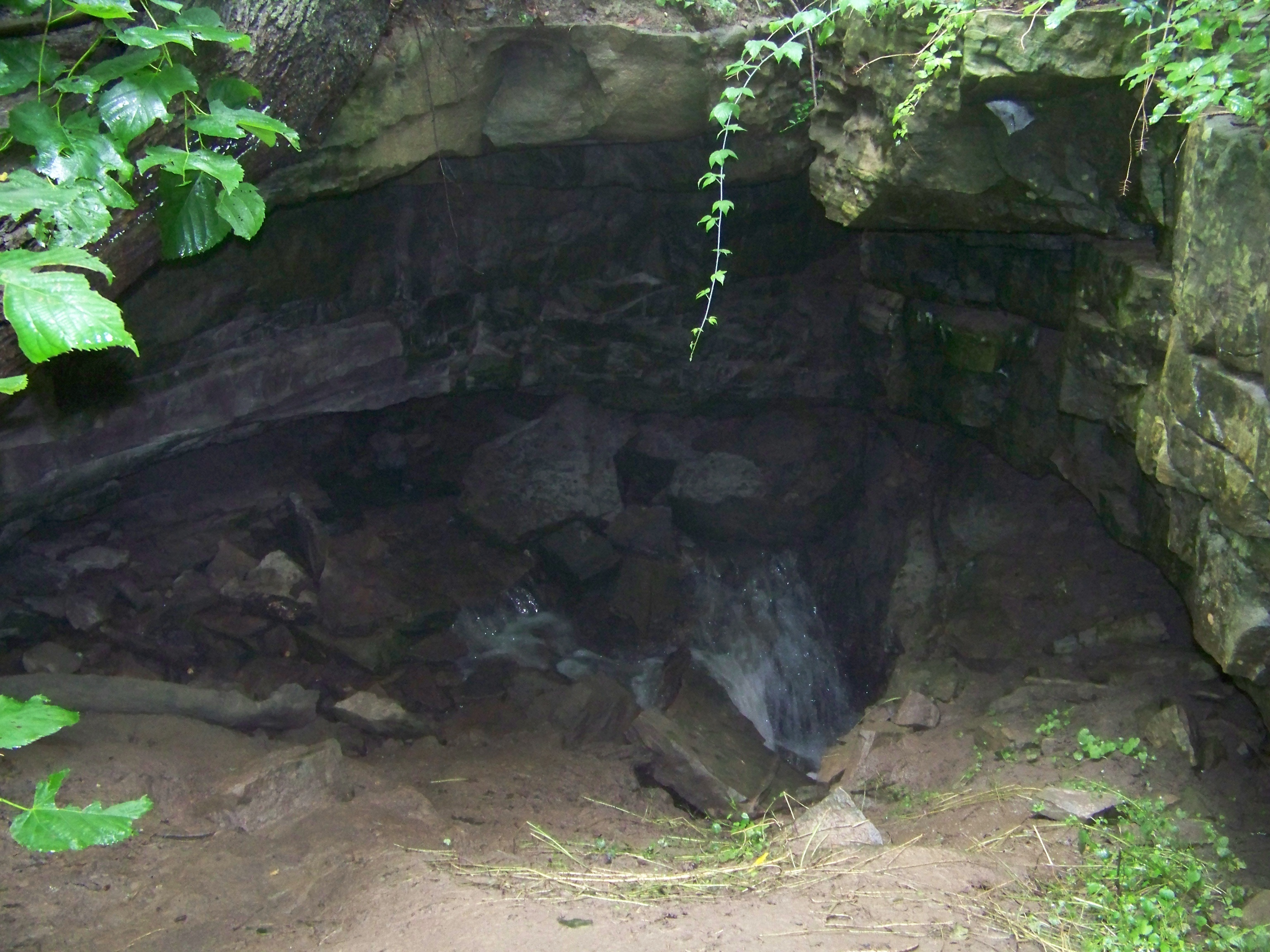
Entrance of Pottruff Cave.

These features are created when a cave's bedrock roof collapses. Pottruff Cave's entrance is an example of such a formation.

=== Valleys ===
Streams flowing through the area have formed valleys that are typical of a karstic landscape. Blind valleys are formed when a stream sinks underground. As there is no farther surface flow, such valleys ends abruptly. A half-blind valley is similar, except that a surface flow is occasionally present downstream of the sinkpoint. Dry valleys were formed prior to the development of underground stream passages, representing a former route of springs before they were diverted by sinkholes. Depending on the stage of evolution, these valleys may or may not have surface flow.

=== Caves ===
Five dissolutional caves, large enough for human entry, have been identified within the area. Nexus Cave is the largest, measuring 335 metres in length, and is the 10th longest cave in Ontario.

== Conservation efforts ==
The ANSI status of the area does not imply automatic protection. The conservation area's boundaries roughly correspond to the Core Area of the ANSI. However, the Feeder Area, where the streams originate, is managed by the Ontario Realty Corporation, which intends to sell it for residential development. Local scientists and politicians urge the Ontario government to abandon its plans and incorporate these lands into the conservation area, arguing that geological and biological diversity of Eramosa Karst will be severely diminished, should the development take place.

It is planned to connect the conservation area to Felker's Falls, Mount Albion Conservation Area, and Bruce Trail via the 10 kilometre East Mountain Loop Trail. Furthermore, a link to Olmstead Cave, located in a Hamilton park, is being considered.
