= Syracuse Formation =

Geologic formation in New York

- Stratigraphic range: Homerian; ~428–425 Ma
- Type: Formation
- Unit of: Salina Group
- Sub-units: Unit F1, Unit F2, Unit F3, Unit F4, Unit F5, Unit E, Unit D
- Underlies: Bertie Formation
- Overlies: Vernon Formation
- Area: Appalachian Basin, Michigan Basin

Lithology
- Primary: Dolomite, Halite
- Other: Anhydrite, Gypsum, Shale, Limestone

Location
- Region: New York, Ohio, Pennsylvania, West Virginia, Michigan
- Country: United States

Type section
- Named for: Town of Syracuse
- Named by: J.M. Clarke

The Syracuse Formation is a geologic formation in the Appalachian Basin. It is the main salt bearing formation of the Salina Group. This formation depending on location contains up to six salt beds. Aside from salt the formation is made up of dolomite, shale, gypsum and anhydrite. Salt is commercially extracted in Michigan, New York and Ohio. Gypsum mining operations in Michigan and New York are also noted.

== Description ==
Outcrops in New York and Michigan contain very little if any salt, since surface water would have dissolved it long ago. Most of what we know about the formation comes from oil and natural gas drilling operations. The formation is broken up into several units each represented by a major salt bed.

== Stratigraphy ==
The upper section or the F1-5 units are where commercially viable salt beds are found. In the E unit the salt beds are not as pure and therefor of little interest.
