= Akron Formation =

Geologic formation in New York, United States

- Stratigraphic range: Silurian
- Type: Formation

Location
- Region: New York, Ontario
- Country: United States, Canada

The Akron Formation is a geologic formation in New York. It preserves fossils dating back to the Silurian period. The Akron Formation is primarily a mottled dolomite. Type section is at Murder Creek, Akron Falls, Akron, New York.

== See also ==
- List of fossiliferous stratigraphic units in New York
