= Bass Islands Formation =

Geologic formation in Michigan

- Stratigraphic range: Silurian
- Type: Formation
- Sub-units: St. Ignace Dolomite, Put-in-Bay Dolomite, Tymochtee Dolomite
- Underlies: Amherstburg Formation, Columbus Limestone, and Helderberg Group
- Overlies: Salina Formation

Location
- Region: Michigan
- Country: United States

The Bass Islands Formation is a geologic formation in Michigan. It preserves fossils dating back to the Silurian period.

== See also ==
- List of fossiliferous stratigraphic units in Michigan
