= Lockport Group =

- Stratigraphic range: Sheinwoodian-Homerian; ~433–427 Ma
- Type: Group
- Unit of: Cayugan Series
- Sub-units: Guelph Formation; Eramosa Formation; Goat Island Formation; Gasport Formation
- Underlies: Vernon Formation
- Overlies: Clinton Group

Lithology
- Primary: Dolomite
- Other: Limestone, Chert

Location
- Region: New York, Ohio, Pennsylvania, West Virginia, Ontario
- Country: United States, Canada
- Extent: Appalachian Basin, Michigan Basin

The Lockport Group is a geologic group in the Appalachian Basin and Michigan Basin in the northeastern United States and Canada. This unit makes up the Niagara Escarpment. Its most famous feature is Niagara Falls. The unit outcrops in New York, Ontario, Michigan, Wisconsin, and Illinois.

== Description ==
The Lockport Group is made up of four formations. From base to top: Gasport Formation, Goat Island Formation, Eramosa Formation and Guelph Formation. The entire unit is composed of dolomite, with the exception of the Gasport which can be limestone, as well as occasional chert nodules.

== Stratigraphy ==
The Guelph Formation is at the top of the Lockport Group. It has been called the "Vernon Transition Zone" due to thin beds and laminations between carbonates, claystones and evaporates. Its base is delimited by a stromatolite bed.

Below the Guelph is the Eramosa Formation. This formation is typically a thinly laminated packstone and grainstone. There are stromatolite beds as well as corals preserved in this formation. Near the base the unit becomes vuggy. Again the top of this formation is marked by a sharp change between grainstone and a stromatolite bed.
