= St. Ignace Dolomite =

Geologic formation in Michigan, USA

Pointe aux Chenes Formation
- Stratigraphic range: Silurian
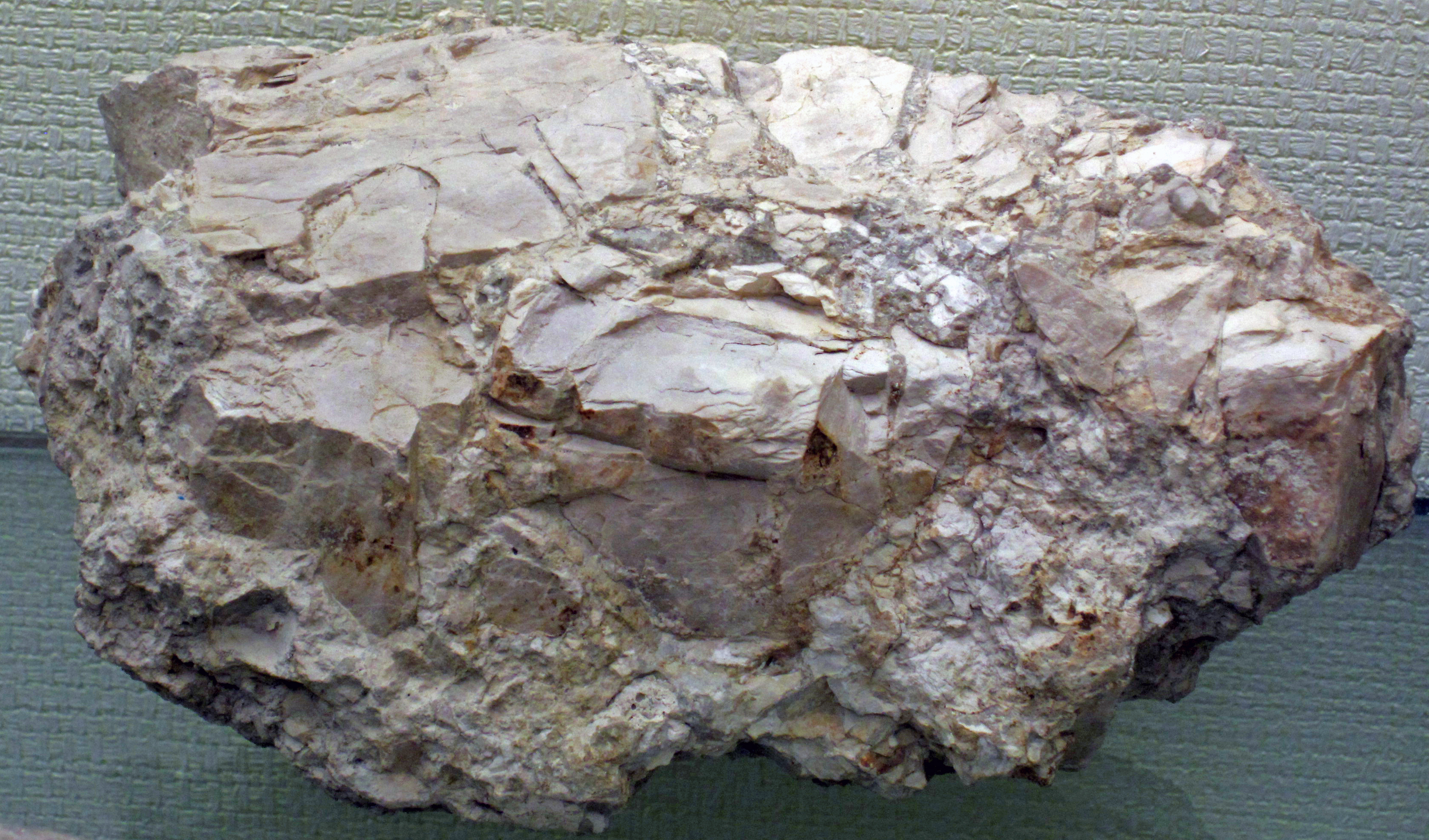
- Mackinac Breccia, Devonian (St. Ignace Dolomite; Upper Peninsula of Michigan)
- Type: Formation
- Unit of: Bass Islands Group
- Underlies: Put-in-Bay Dolomite
- Overlies: Pointe aux Chenes Formation

Location
- Region: Michigan
- Country: United States

The St. Ignace Dolomite is a geologic formation in Michigan. It preserves fossils dating back to the Silurian period.
