= Goat Island Formation =

Fossil-bearing rock in Ontario

- Stratigraphic range: Silurian
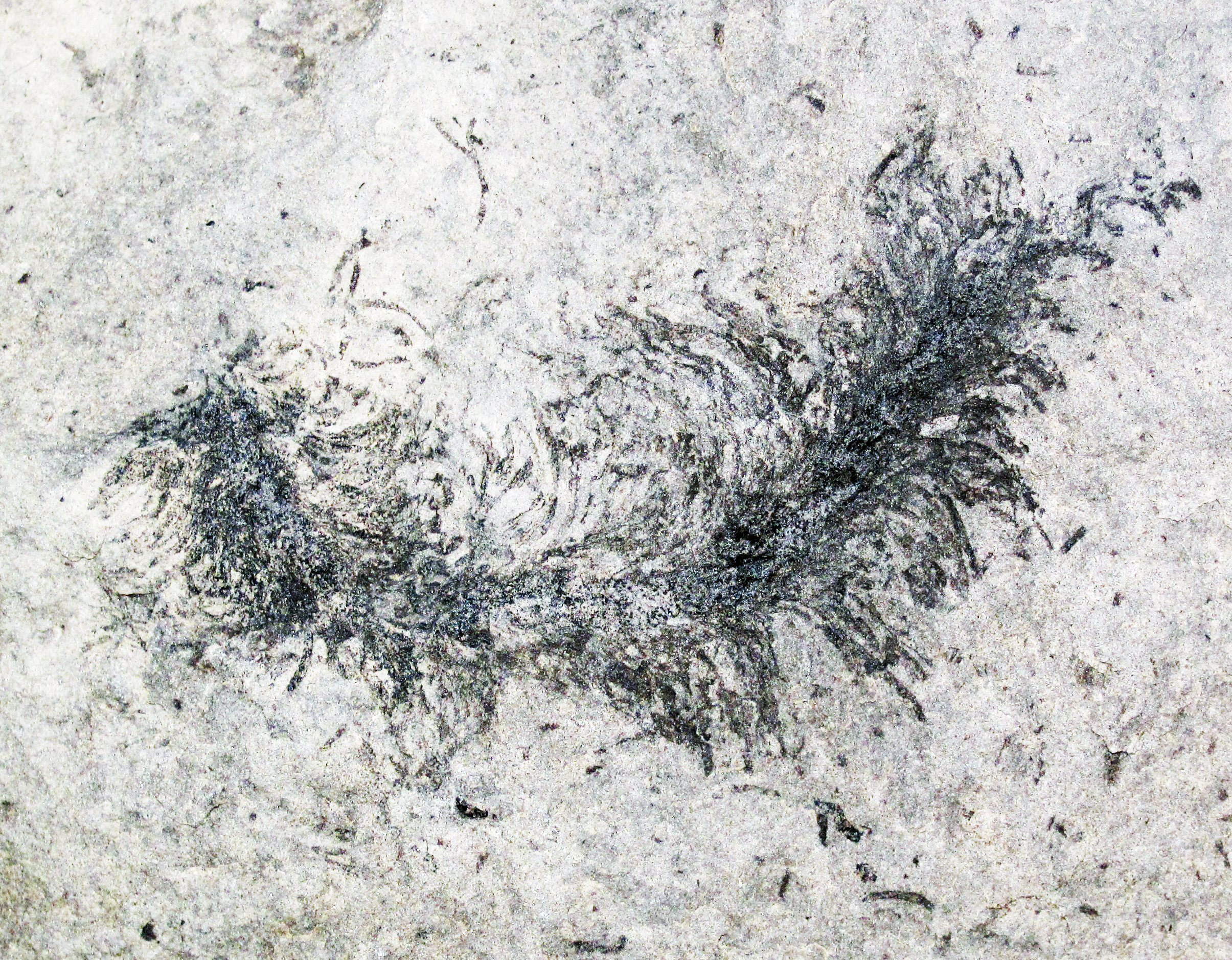
- Algae fossil from the Goat Island Formation (New York State)
- Type: Formation

Location
- Region: Ontario, New York (state)
- Country: Canada, United States

The Goat Island Formation is a geologic formation within the Appalachian Basin. It is one of the formations that make up the Lockport Group of the Silurian period.
