= Salina Group =

Large Geologic Group

- Stratigraphic range: Homerian-Přídolí; ~430–420 Ma
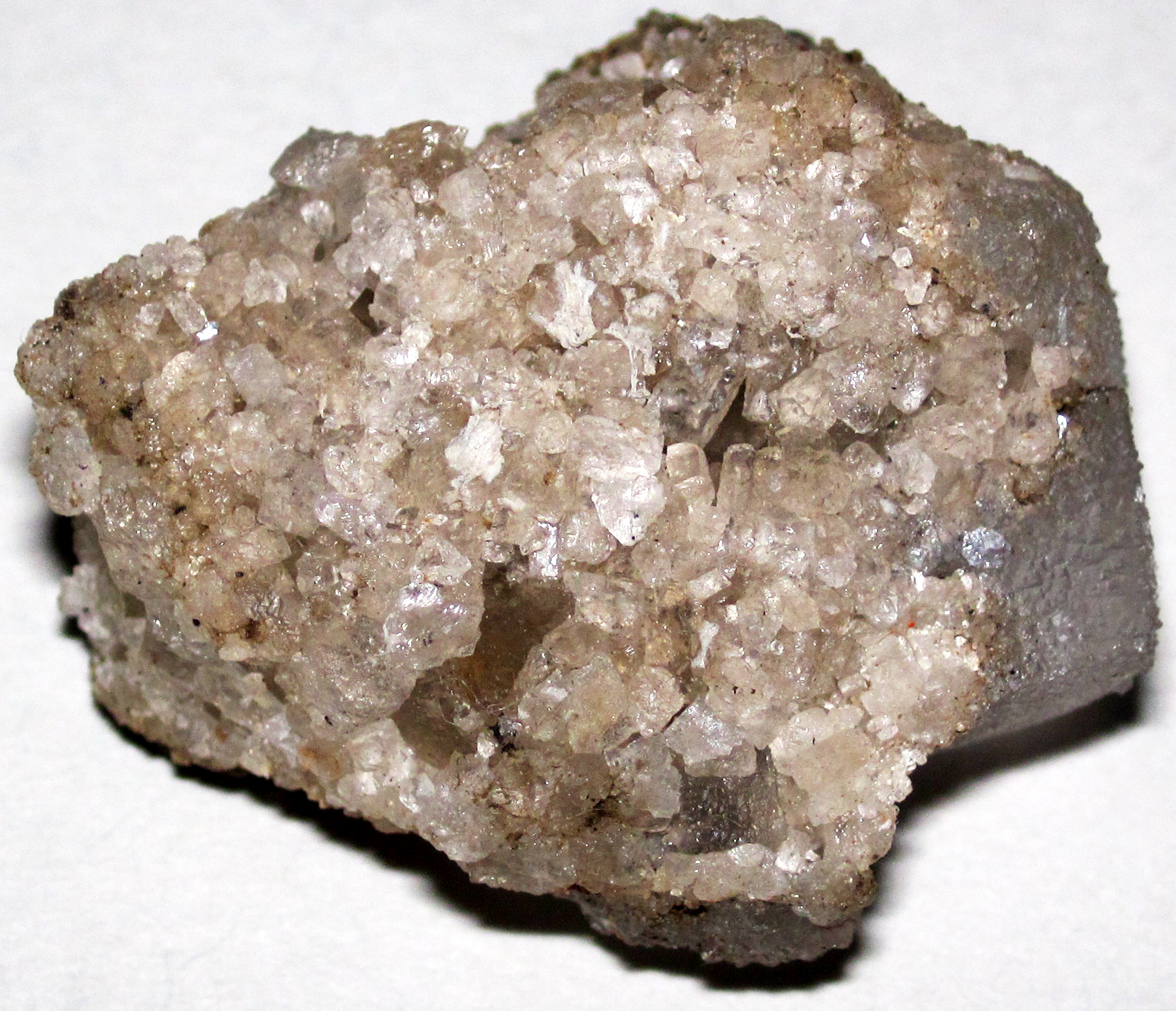
- Halite (Salina Group, Silurian; Detroit Salt Company mine, Detroit, Michigan, USA)
- Type: Geological group
- Unit of: Cayugan Series
- Sub-units: Appalachian Basin & Michigan Basin: Bertie Formation; Camillus Formation; Syracuse Formation; Vernon Formation; Illinois Basin: Wabash Formation; Liston Creek Member; Kenneth Limestone Member; Kokomo Limestone Member; Misslssinewa Shale Formation; Pleant Mills Limestone; Limberlost Member
- Underlies: Helderberg Group
- Overlies: Lockport Group & Bloomsburg Formation

Lithology
- Primary: Dolomite & Shale
- Other: Anhydrite, Limestone, Gypsum & Halite

Location
- Region: Appalachian Basin & Michigan Basin of eastern North America
- Country: United States of America and Canada

Type section
- Named for: Salt found within the formation
- Named by: James Dwight Dana

The Salina Group or Salina Formation is a Late Silurian-age, stratigraphic unit of sedimentary rock that is found in Northeastern and Midwestern North America. Named for its Halite beds, the phrase "Salina Group" was first used as a descriptive term by James D. Dana in 1863.

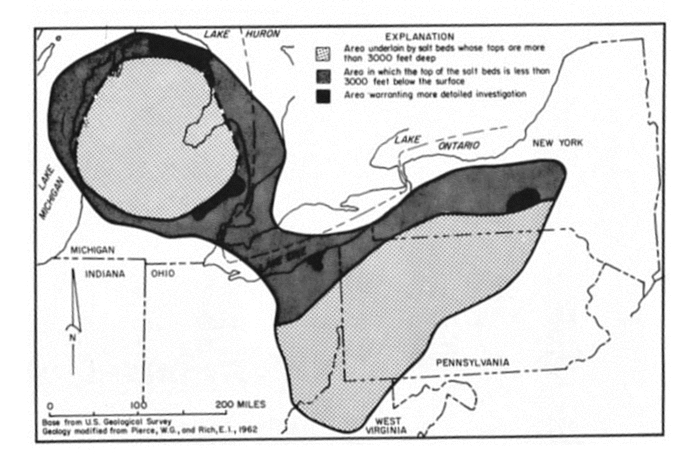
Figure 1: Extent of the Silurian salt deposits in Michigan, Ohio, New York, and adjacent states

The Salina is an extensive formation. It ranges from West Virginia up through Pennsylvania into Ohio and then Michigan in the United States, and from Pennsylvania into New York. It is also found in the Canadian province of Ontario. (See Figure 1.)

The thickness of the Salina Group varies greatly within the two basins, ranging from 84 feet in the southwestern corner of Michigan to an estimated 5,000 feet in that state's Gladwin County.

This formation is of economic importance for salt mining, oil reservoir creation, gypsum mining, and potential natural gas storage. Research has also been done on the viability of storing radioactive waste in the salt beds of the Salina.

== Description ==
The Salina Formation is composed chiefly of dolomite and shale, interbedded with anhydrite, gypsum, and salt.

== Stratigraphy ==
Stratigraphically, the Salina is placed in the Late Silurian age and is the lower member of the Cayugan Series. It overlies predominantly the Lockport; in parts central to northeast Pennsylvania it overlies the Bloomsburg Formation. It also underlies the Helderberg Group.

=== Appalachian & Michigan Basins ===
Being a thick formation, the Salina has subunits, as well as letter designations for the different formations. The letters originate at the base (oldest) with the A unit to the stratigraphic top H unit (youngest) made up of Anhydrite.

During an extensive study in the state of Michigan, each unit was mapped. Unit A consists of dolomite and shaly dolomite, and is the bottom of the Vernon. Where the formation thickens, there may also be one or two large salt beds within the unit. Anhydrite can be found throughout this unit. Due to unit A having two salt or anhydrite beds, it is often divided into the A1 and A2, with A1 being the basal unit.

Unit B is another salt unit and marks the Middle Vernon. The percentage of salt can range from 90% to 100%. Thin dolomite beds run through this unit. In comparison, Unit C marks the top of the Vernon Formation. It is a shaly dolomite; however, it can range from pure shale to pure dolomite beds within the unit. Anhydrite can be prevalent within this unit as well.

Unit D, the bottom of the Syracuse formation, is almost pure salt. Some dolomite may also occur within this unit. It is the thinnest unit of the Salina, and is not always present.

Unit E consists of shale, but can include dolomitic shale and dolomite. Anhydrite may also be present within this unit and is also part of the Syracuse.

Unit F is the youngest and largest salt in the group, also known as the Syracuse Formation. Where thicker, the F has beds of salt separated by rock grading from shale to dolomite, often with anhydrite present especially in the shale.

Unit G is the Camillus, which consists of dolomite and anhydrite while unit H is known as the Bertie Formation. In the Michigan Basin, the Bertie is pinched out; the Bass Islands Formation makes up the upper most Salina.

=== Cincinnati Arch & Findlay Arch ===
In this region the Salina is made of primarily dolostone and shale. The B - G groups are undifferentiated and have localized occurrences of salt and anhydrite general just called Salina formation.

Below the Undifferentiated Salina is the Tymochtee Formation. This can be light to dark gray dolomite. Moving west it becomes more shaley to the point that it maybe considered dolomitic shale. It contains traces of anhydrite and gypsum nodules. Locally fowling water wells with a sulphureous (rotten egg) odor.

=== Illinois Basin ===
==== Wabash Formation ====
Wabash Formation made up of the Liston Creek Member, Kenneth Limestone Member, Kokomo Limestone Member and the Mississinewa Shale member.

==== Pleasant Mills Formation ====
The Pleasant Mills Formation is made up of the Louisville Equivalent Member and Waldon Equivalent Member and Limberlost Dolomite Member. The Pleasant Mills Formation is equivalent to the entire "A Unit" in the Appalachian Basin.

== Economic Resources ==
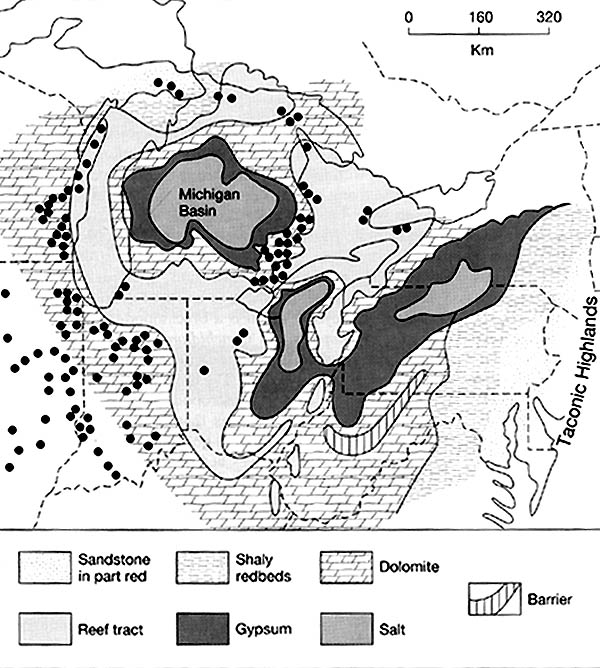
Carbonite and Evaporite deposits in North East United States

=== Salt ===
Salt mines and brine wells are located in Western New York, Northeast Ohio and Detroit, Michigan with Ohio's salt production predating European settlement of the area as Native Americans collected and processed brine from springs in several locations, including "salt licks" where minerals were deposited by brine seeping out of the ground. Licking County was named for this natural phenomenon. Mahoning County's name is derived from a Native American term "ma-hon-ink" meaning "at the lick."

Throughout the early 1800s, Ohio's salt demand exceeded its production from brine wells and licks. Oil and gas exploration facilitated the discovery of salt during the 1860s; however, it was not until 1886 when the Cleveland Rolling Mill was drilling its second natural gas well that it hit brine. The salt was located at a depth of approximately 1,900 feet.

By the 1890s, brine wells were drilled and operating in Cleveland. During this period, five salt-producing companies operated in Northeast Ohio. Sterling Morton built a salt mine at a depth of 1800 feet on Cleveland's east side and Clarence Foster examined drilling records from Standard Oil along Lake Erie.

=== Gypsum ===
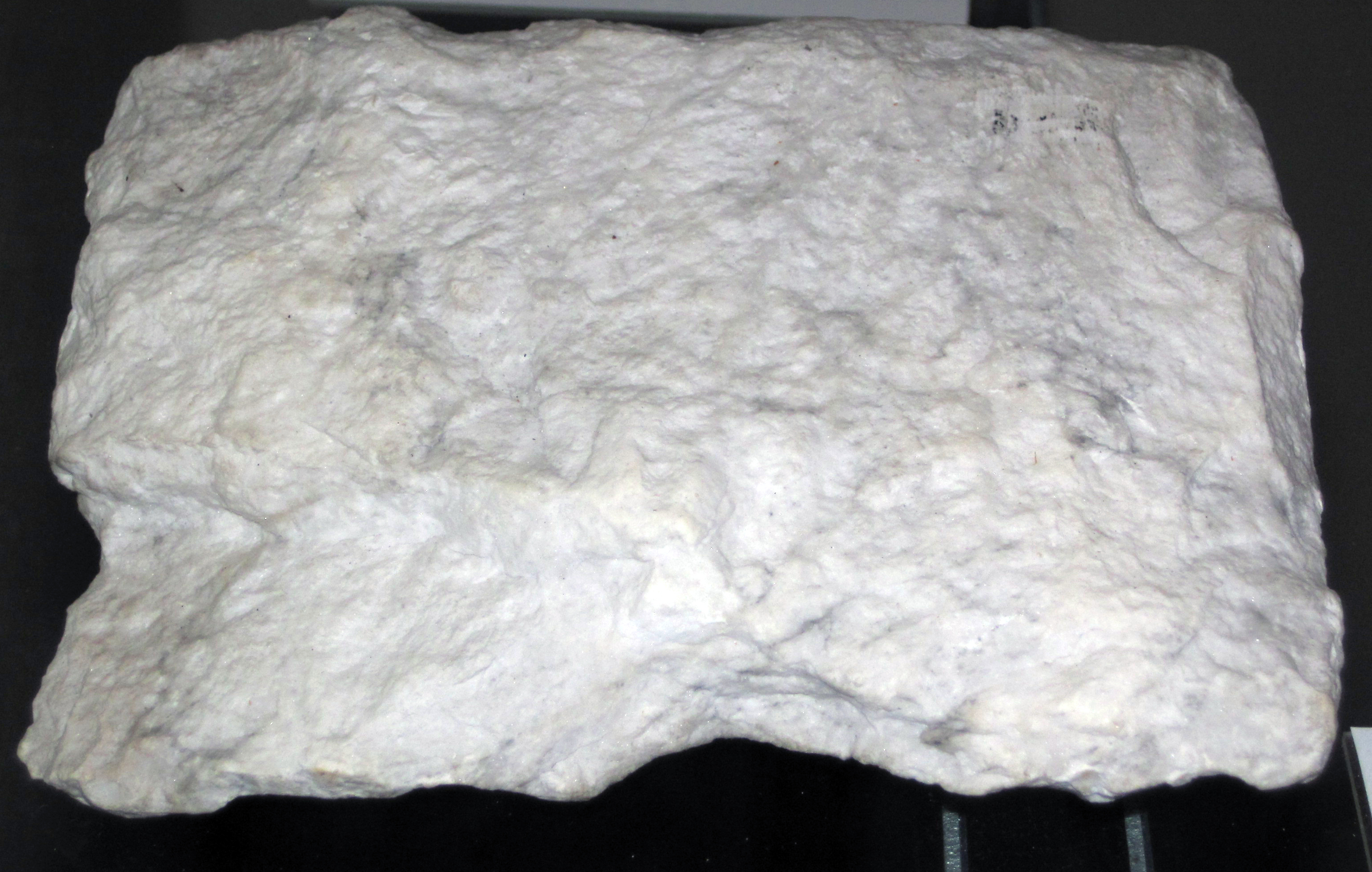
Rock gypsum (gyprock) (Salina Group, Upper Silurian; Ottawa County, Ohio, USA)

In 1827, Gypsum was first identified in Michigan, near Grand Rapids. An Odawa man discovered it in a rock outcrop along Plaster Creek where it enters Grand River.

In 1838, Michigan's first state geologist, Douglass Houghton, arrived to select a site for salt mining and reported an abundance of gypsum in the area. That same year, he and Bela Hubbard discovered an outcrop of gypsum at the mouth of the Au Gres River in Saginaw Bay. In 1841, Daniel Ball and business partner Warren Granger built a mill to process gypsum in 1841; a mill built by Houghton and Hubbard in Alabaster, Michigan became operational in 1862.

=== Oil and Gas ===
The Salina serves as an oil reservoir formation along the Findlay Arch from Southwestern Michigan down into Northwest Ohio. Salt is not present along the Arch System.

== Fossils ==
=== Algae ===
Medusaegraptus graminiformis (Ruedemann 1925)

=== Brachiopoda ===
Orbiculoidea bertiensis (Ruedemann)

Lingula semina (Ruedemann)

=== Coral ===
Cyathophyllum hydraulicum (Simpson)

=== Eurypterida ===
Eurypterus remipes (DeKay, 1825)

Archaeophonus eurypteroides (Kjellesvig-Waering 1966)

Proscorpius osborni (Whitfield 1885)

Paracarcinosoma scorpionis (Grote & Pitt)

Eurypterus lacustris (Harlan, 1834)

Erettopterus waylandsmithi (Kjellesvig-Waering & Caster 1955)

Waeringopterus cumberlandicus (Leutze, 1961)

Waeringopterus apfeli (Leutze, 1961)

Dolichopterus herkimerensis (Caster and Kjellesvig-Waering 1956)

=== Ostracodes ===
Leperditia scalaris (Jones 1856)

=== Mollusca ===
==== Bivalvia ====
Megalomus canadensis (Hall, 1852)
