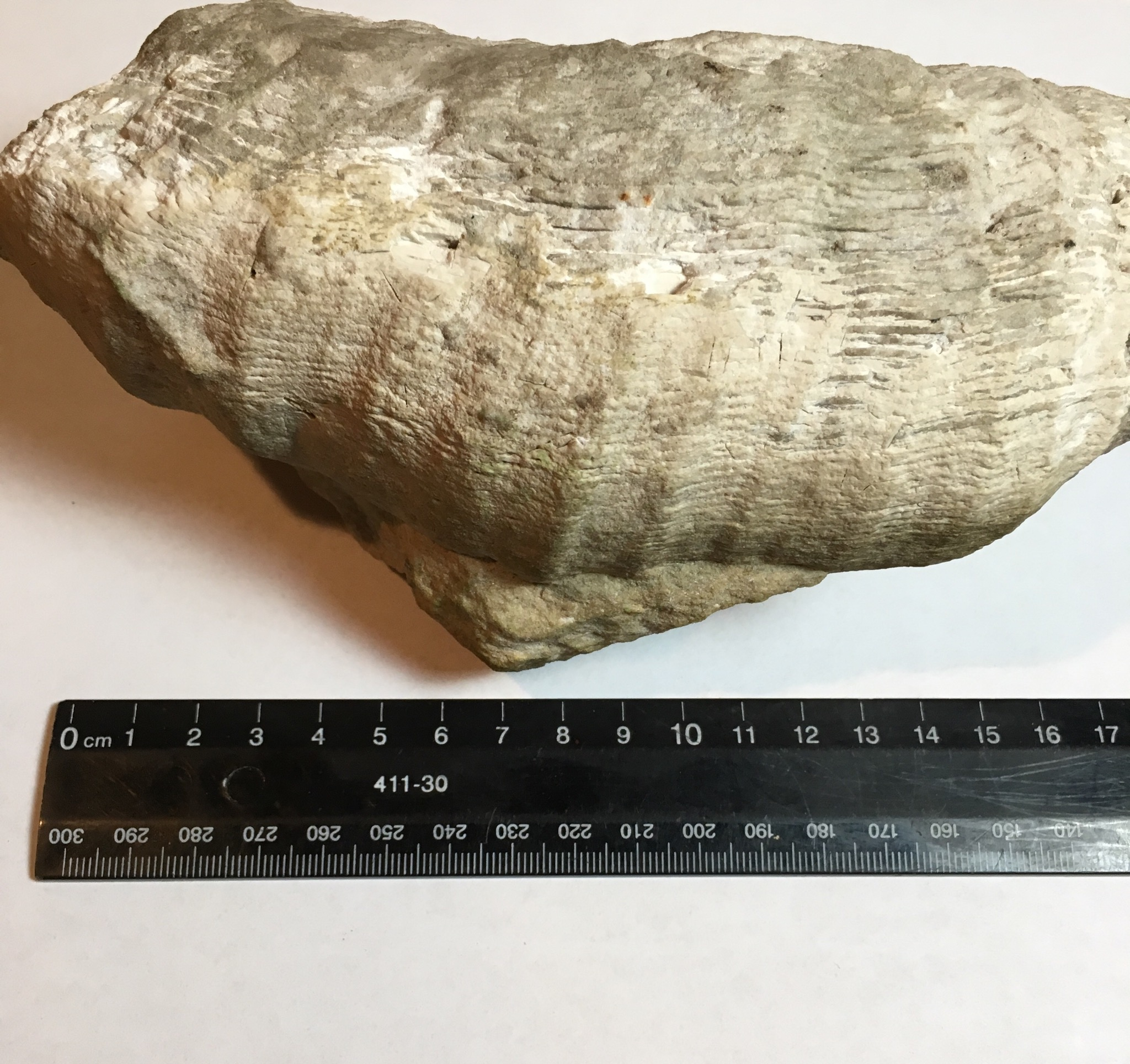

Scientific classification
- Kingdom: Animalia
- Phylum: Cnidaria
- Class: Anthozoa
- Order: Rugosa
- Family: Streptelasmatidae
- Genus: Siphonophrentis O'Connell 1914
- Species: S. gigantea

Binomial name
- Siphonophrentis gigantea (Lesueur 1821)

= Siphonophrentis gigantea =

Siphonophrentis gigantea Temporal range: Middle Devonian

Extinct species of coral

Siphonophrentis gigantea is an extinct species of giant rugose coral. It lived during the Middle Devonian period of the Paleozoic era.

== Paleoecology ==
Siphonophrentis gigantea was a solitary marine stony coral. Like all stony corals, it possessed a soft-tissue polyp that lived inside of and upon its calcite calyx. In life this species would have anchored itself by the apical end to the seabed, or perhaps reclined on its side, while the tentacles of the polyp caught prey or marine snow.

According to one study, Siphonophrentis gigantea may have been a deep-water species of coral. The matrix around one specimen was rich in nutrients when the rock was formed, meaning it likely formed in sediment whose nutrients were not completely consumed before the sediment lithified. In such deep water, light would likely have been insufficient to support symbiotic Zooxanthellae, and so the polyp was likely colorless.
