= Vernon Formation =

- Stratigraphic range: Homerian; ~430–428 Ma
- Type: Formation
- Unit of: Salina Group, Wills Creek and Bloomsburg
- Sub-units: Lower Vernon (unit A); Middle Vernon (unit B); Upper Vernon (unit C)
- Underlies: Syracuse Formation
- Overlies: Lockport

Location
- Region: New York, Pennsylvania
- Country: United States

Type section
- Named for: Vernon, New York
- Named by: J.M. Clarke

The Vernon Formation is a geologic formation in the Appalachian Basin. It is the lowest unit of the Salina Group. It is made up of red and green shales, siltstone, dolomite, anhydrite and halite. It is made up of three distinct units starting at the bottom (oldest) A, B and C units. These units correspond to units of the same name in its parent group the Salina.

== Description ==
The Vernon Formation mostly is within the Salina Group. However, in Central Pennsylvania and Central New York onward East the Vernon is part of both the Wills Creek and Bloomsburg due to erosional deposits migrating from the east.

== Stratigraphy ==
Lower Vernon (or Unit A) is the base of both the Vernon and Salina in western Pennsylvania and New York, continuing into Ohio and Michigan. In north central Pennsylvania and central New York it is a part of the Bloomsburg. The Bloomsburg is an ancient delta system carrying sediment westward from the Taconic Highlands slowly filling the basin. In the west the basin was filled with carbonates and shales.

The Base of the Vernon is marked in the west typically by a sharp drop in gamma logs. This is due to the disappearance of shale and moving into a crystalline near pure carbonite unit. The would be either the Lockport or the Guelph dolomites, depending on location. Within the Michigan Basin and Ohio the Lower Vernon is further into two units the A1 and A2. Each unit has a lower division of evaporite (salt or anhydrite) and the upper section is a carbonate, typically dolomite. In the east the Lower Vernon contains predominantly red shale. Moving west this is gradually replaced with green shale, then grey shale. Finally dolomite, anhydrite and halite in the western extent. The Middle Vernon (Unit B) is within the Salina from western Pennsylvania and New York on west. In the central part of theses states on east in is the lowest member of the Wills Creak. This difference again is due to erosional clastic material moving westward from the Taconic Highlands.

In the East or Wills Creak area, the Middle Vernon has occasional red shales, particularly in the southeast. Generally, however it is predominantly green shale, with interbedded dolomite and siltstone. Moving west dolomite replaces shale and anhydrite becomes prevalent. Within the Salina parts of the formation there may be up to seven distinct salt beds. The base of the Middle Vernon is marked in the Salina by the last salt bed, and a slight overall rise in gamma. With in the Wills Creek area, it is marked by a general overall rise in gamma.

The Upper Vernon, is composed of shale and siltstone. Red and green shale to the east with grey and green to the west. In western Pennsylvania dolomite and anhydrite appear. Generally evaporites are not common in this section. The base is marked by a sharp drop in gamma, due to a salt bed in the west and dolomite to the east.
