= Detroit River Group =

Geologic group in Michigan and Ohio

- Stratigraphic range: Devonian
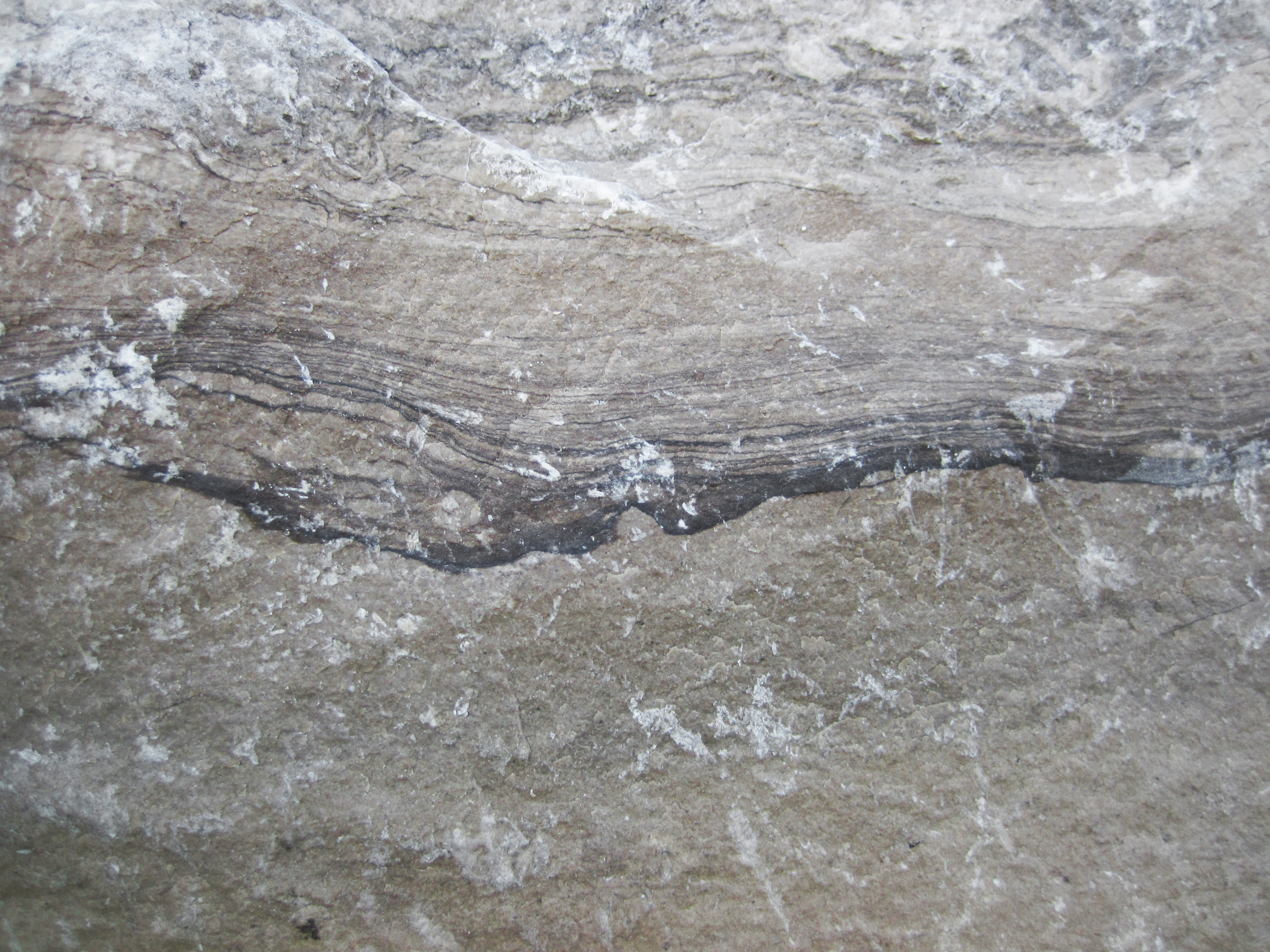
- Lucas Dolomite, upper Detroit River Group, Middle Devonian (quarry near Junction, Ohio)
- Type: Group
- Sub-units: Lucas Dolomite, Formosa Reef Limestone
- Underlies: Dundee Limestone and Traverse Formation
- Overlies: Holland Quarry Shale and Wabash Formation

Location
- Region: Indiana, Michigan and Ohio
- Country: United States

The Detroit River Group is a geologic group in Michigan and Ohio. It preserves fossils dating back to the Devonian period.
