= Přídolí =

- Market town
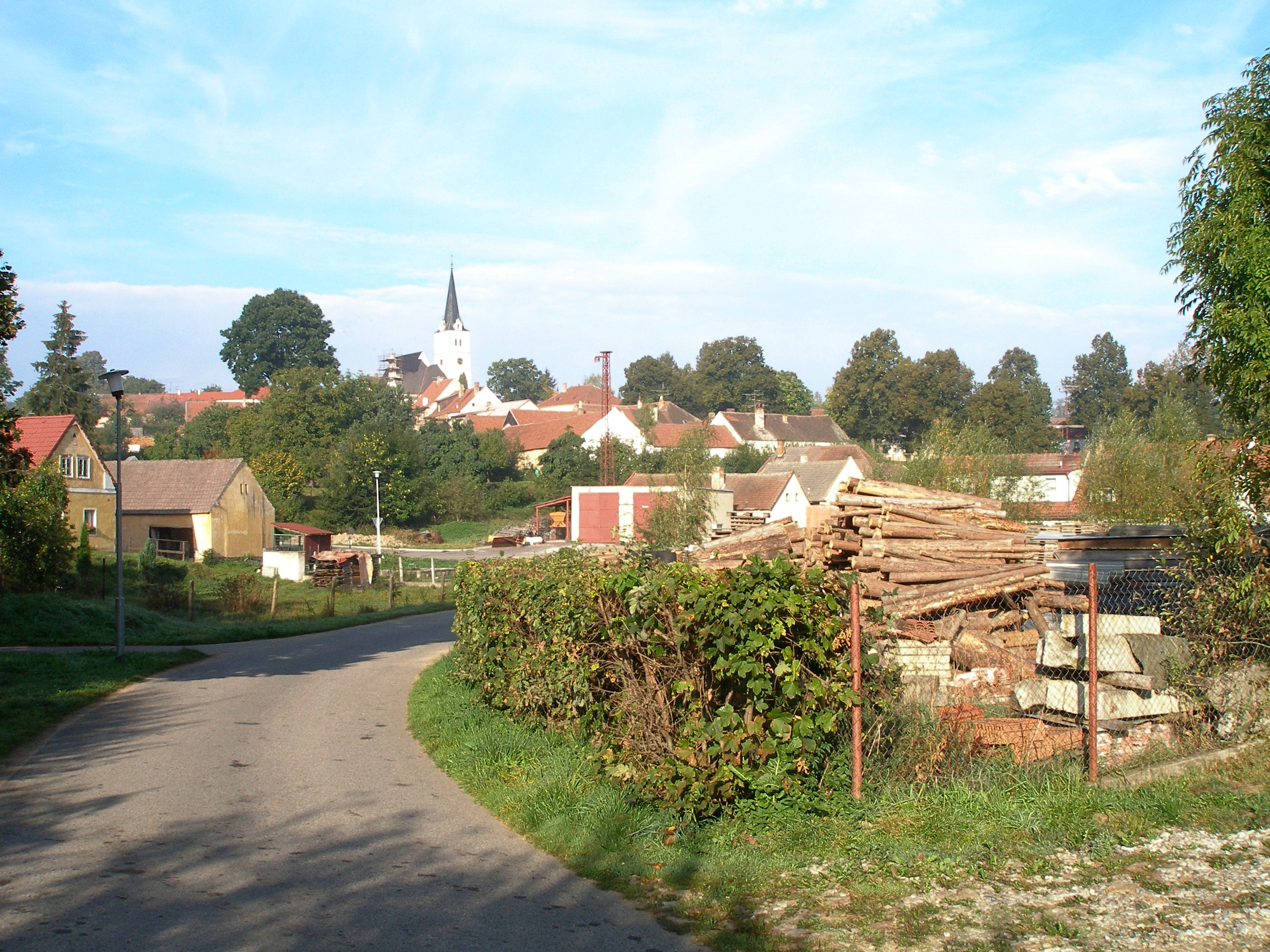
- View towards the centre of Přídolí

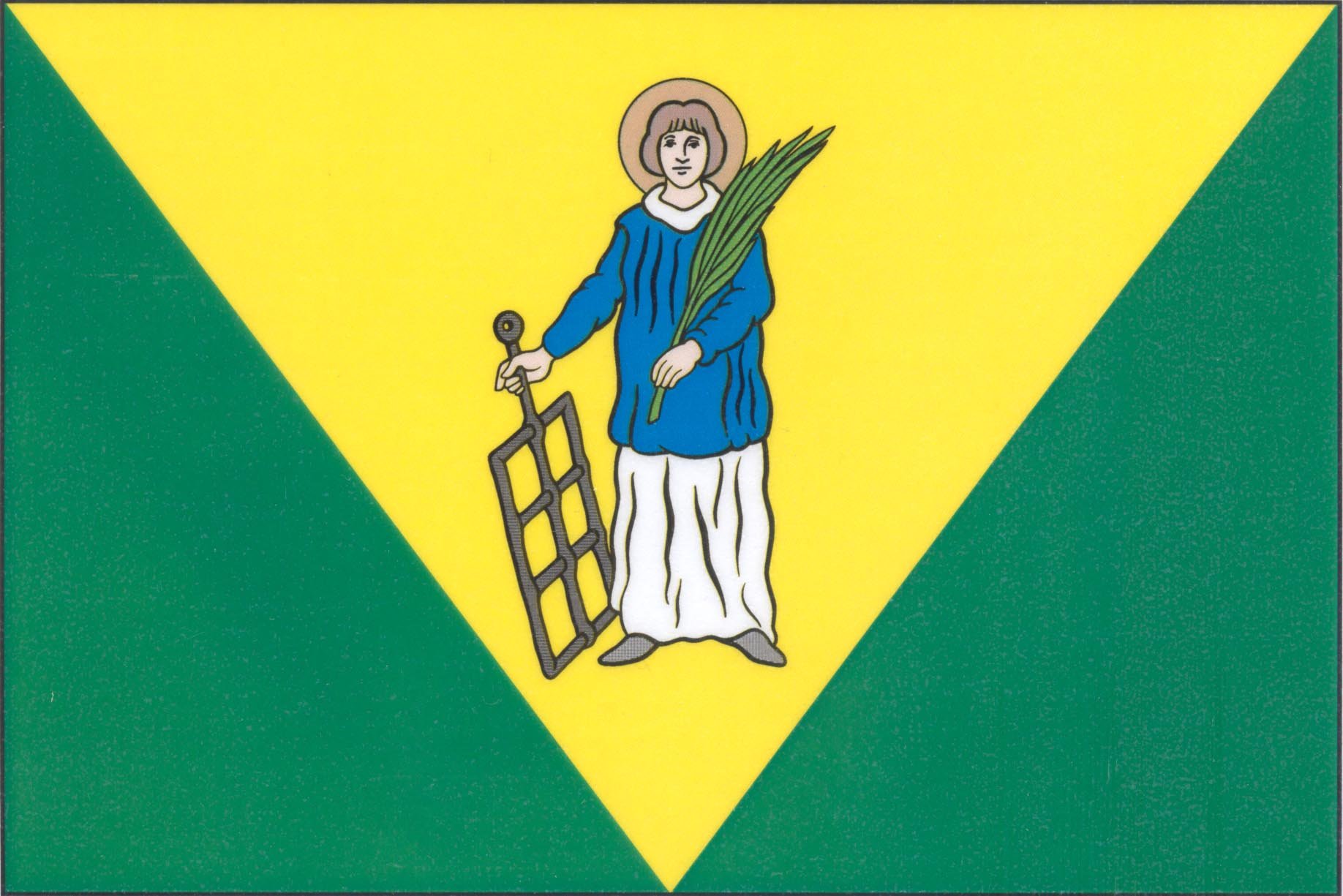
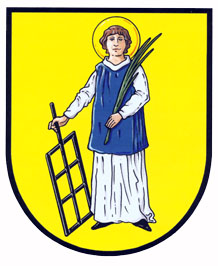
- Flag Coat of arms

- Location in the Czech Republic
- Coordinates: 48°46′55″N 14°21′8″E
- Country: Czech Republic
- Region: South Bohemian
- District: Český Krumlov
- First mentioned: 1220

Area
  - Total: 40.04 km^{2} (15.46 sq mi)
- Elevation: 670 m (2,200 ft)

Population (2026-01-01)
  - Total: 719
  - Density: 18.0/km^{2} (46.5/sq mi)
- Time zone: UTC+1 (CET)
  - Summer (DST): UTC+2 (CEST)
- Postal code: 382 01
- Website: www.pridoli.cz

Přídolí (Czech pronunciation: [ˈpr̝̊iːdoliː]; German: Priethal) is a market town in Český Krumlov District in the South Bohemian Region of the Czech Republic. It has about 700 inhabitants.

== Administrative division ==
Přídolí consists of eight municipal parts (in brackets population according to the 2021 census):

- Přídolí (460)
- Dubová (10)
- Práčov (87)
- Sedlice (10)
- Spolí (32)
- Všeměry (12)
- Zahořánky (34)
- Záluží (15)

== Etymology ==
The name evolved from the Old Czech word přiedolé, which meant "a place in front of a valley".

== Geography ==
Přídolí is located about 4 kilometres (2 mi) southeast of Český Krumlov and 22 km (14 mi) southwest of České Budějovice. It lies in the Bohemian Forest Foothills, only a small part of the municipal territory in the north extends into the Gratzen Foothills. The highest point is at 879 m (2,884 ft) above sea level. The market town is situated on the right bank of the Vltava River.

== History ==
The first written mention of Přídolí is in a deed of Vítek III of Prčice (founder of the Rosenberg family) from 1220. In 1231, Vítek III of Prčice is documented as the owner of Přídolí. In 1336, Přídolí was promoted to a market town. During the rule of the Rosenberg family, before the start of the Hussite Wars in 1419, Přídolí was experiencing the period of its greatest prosperity. During the Hussite Wars, the market town was badly damaged and never fully recovered from it.

In 1622, the Český Krumlov estate, including Přídolí, was donated to the Eggenberg family. During their rule, the territory was colonised by the Germans, because the Eggenbergs needed miners to mine silver here. In 1719, the estate was inherited by the Schwarzenberg family.

== Demographics ==
Historical population

Year	Pop.	±%
1869	1,506	—
1880	1,404	−6.8%
1890	1,405	+0.1%
1900	1,435	+2.1%
1910	1,522	+6.1%

Year	Pop.	±%
1921	1,510	−0.8%
1930	1,873	+24.0%
1950	934	−50.1%
1961	624	−33.2%
1970	540	−13.5%

Year	Pop.	±%
1980	514	−4.8%
1991	512	−0.4%
2001	552	+7.8%
2011	656	+18.8%
2021	660	+0.6%

Source: Censuses

== Transport ==
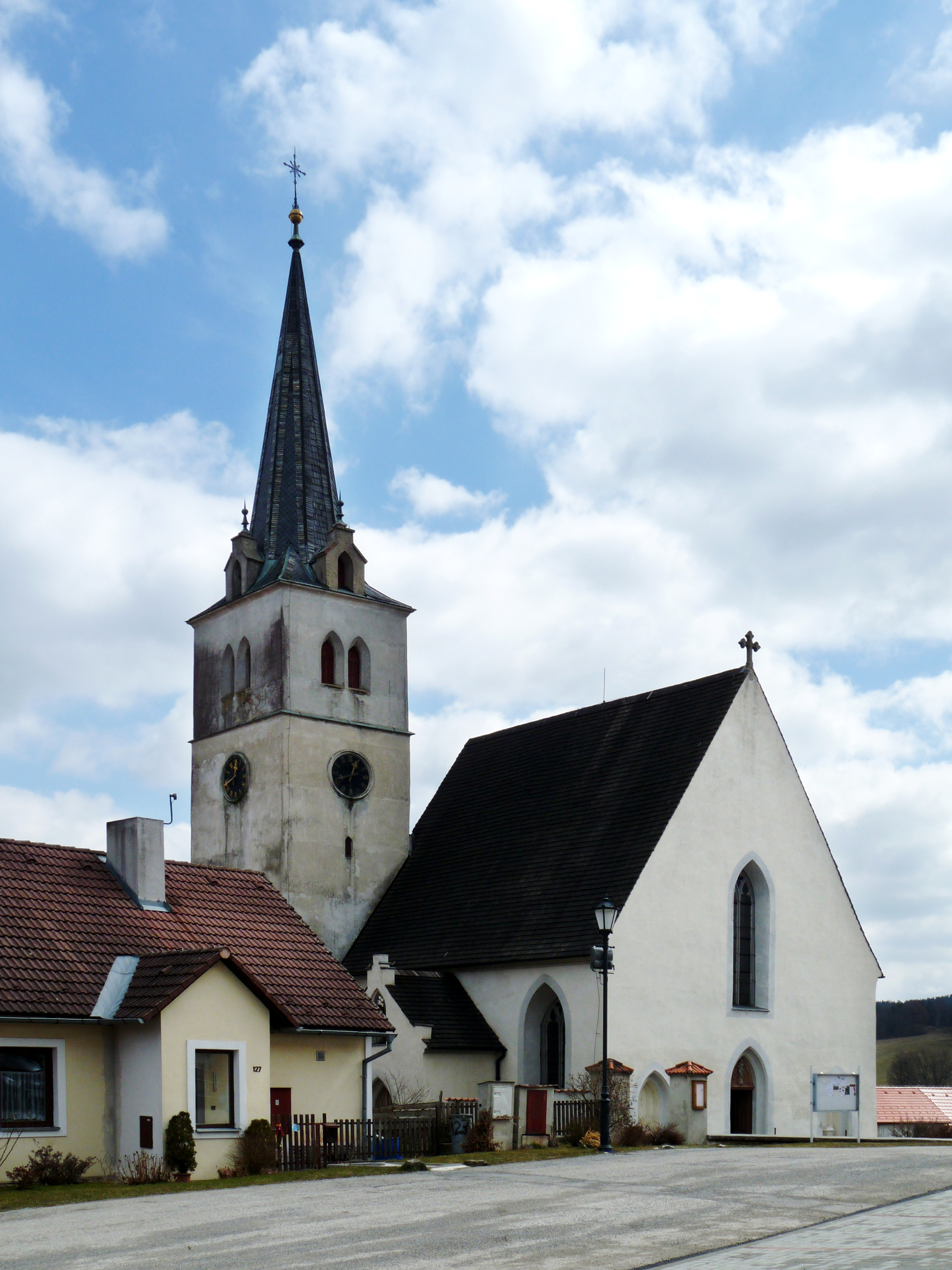
Church of Saint Lawrence

There are no railways or major roads passing through the municipality.

== Sights ==
The main landmark of Přídolí is the Church of Saint Lawrence. It has a Gothic core from the 14th century. In 1870, it was rebuilt into its present neo-Gothic form.
