= Four Mile Dam Formation =

Geological feature in Michigan USA

- Stratigraphic range: Middle Devonian (Givetian)
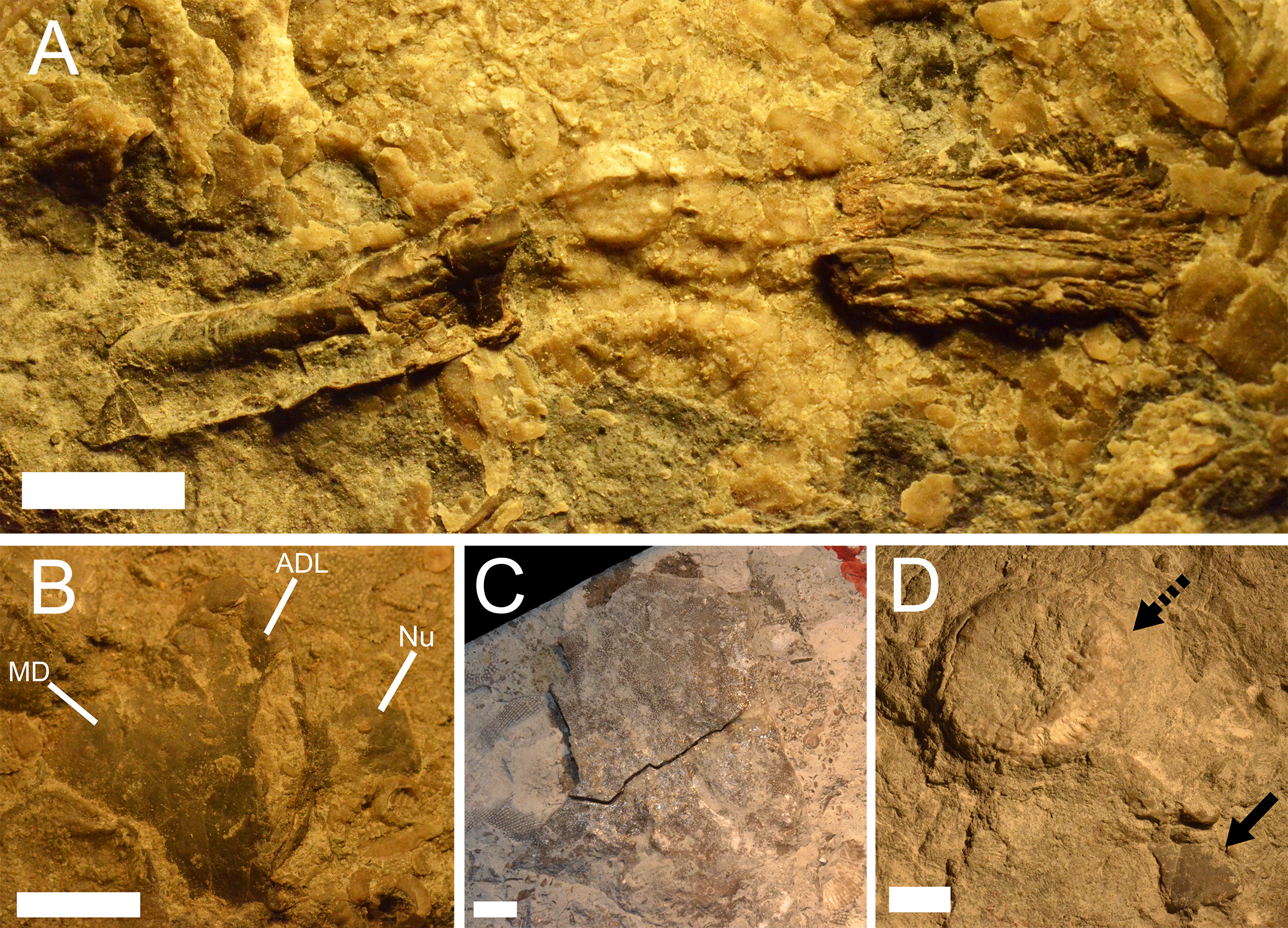
- Vertebrate remains from the Four Mile Dam Formation.
- Type: Geological formation
- Unit of: Traverse Group

Lithology
- Primary: Limestone

Location
- Region: Michigan
- Country: United States

Type section
- Named by: Cooper & Warthin
- Year defined: 1941

The Four Mile Dam Formation, also called the Four Mile Dam Limestone, is a geologic formation in Michigan. It preserves fossils dating back to the middle Devonian period.

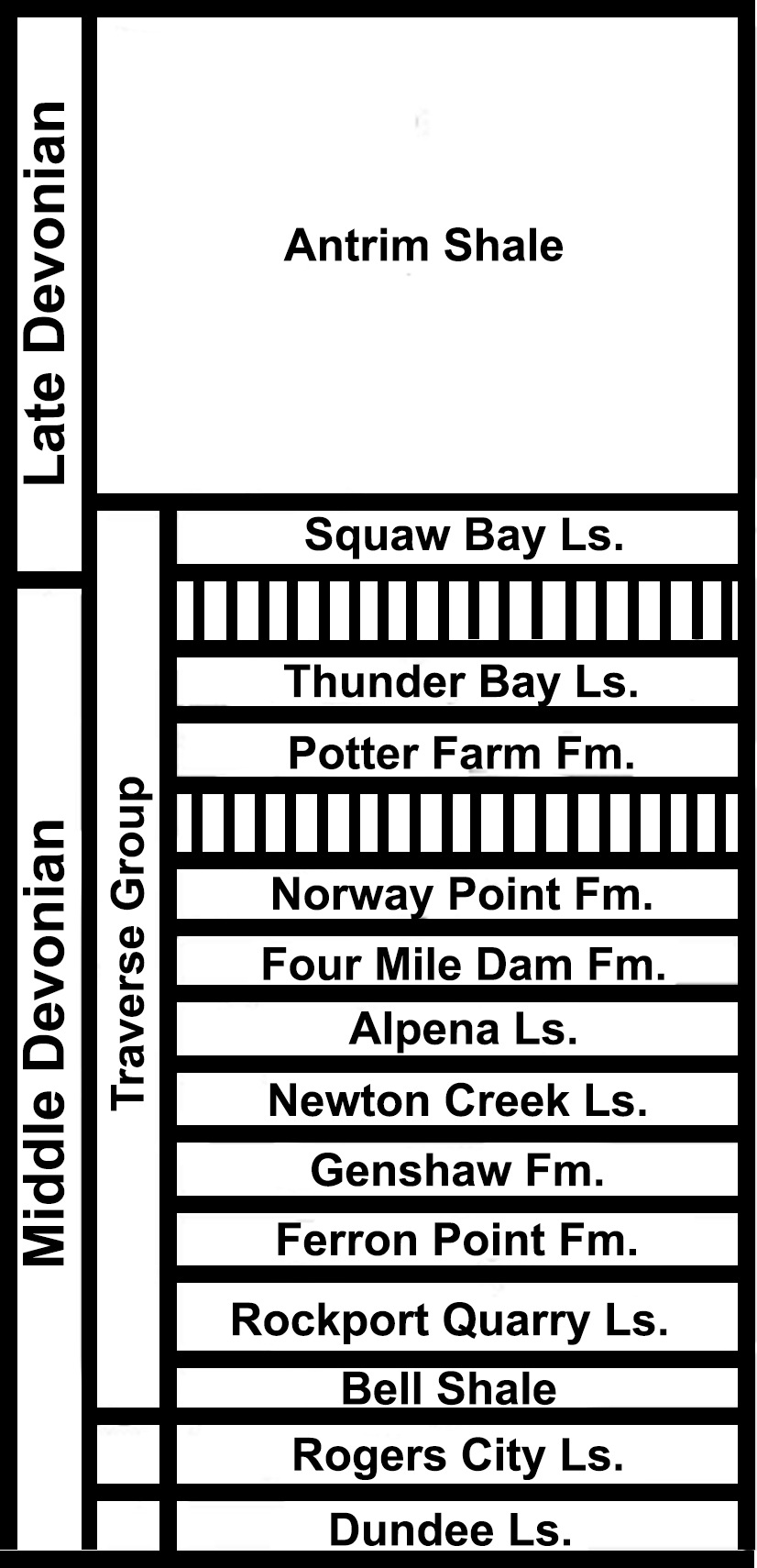
Stratigraphy of the Devonian deposits of the northern part of the Lower Peninsula of Michigan, showing the Four Mile Dam Formation

== Fossil content ==
=== Vertebrates ===
==== Acanthodians ====
Acanthodians reported from the Four Mile Dam Formation
Genus	Species	Presence	Material	Notes	Images
'Acanthodii'	Unidentified		"Two partial fin spines (JS 120, JS 121)".	"Distinct from named acanthodians (Gyracanthus, Machaeracanthus, and Oracanthus) and chondrichthyans (Tamiobatis and Acondylacanthus) reported from Michigan".	

==== Conodonts ====
Conodonts reported from the Four Mile Dam Formation
Genus	Species	Presence	Material	Notes	Images
Acodina	A. formosa			Also found in the Detroit River, Traverse, Dundee, Bell, Alpena and Norway Point formations.	
Belodella	B. devonicus			Also found in the Detroit River, Traverse, Antrim, Alpena and Norway Point formations.	
Icriodus	I. latericrescens latericrescens			Also found in the Traverse, Bell, Ferron Point, Genshaw, Newton Creek, Alpena, Norway Point, Potter Farm and Thunder Bay formations.	
Ozarkodina	O. willsi			Also found in the Detroit River, Traverse, Antrim, Dundee, Alpena and Norway Point formations.	
Polygnathus	P. varcus			Also found in the Traverse, Antrim, Alpena, Norway Point and Thunder Bay formations.	

==== Placoderms ====
Placoderms reported from the Four Mile Dam Formation
Genus	Species	Presence	Material	Notes	Images
?Macropetalichthys	?M. sp.		"A partial head shield (32M)".	A petalichthyid.	
?Mylostoma	?M. sp.		39 specimens, including potential juveniles.		
'Placodermi'	Unidentified		"One specimen of an armour plate (JS 4)".		
Protitanichthys	P. rockportensis		"One specimen of an armor fragment (JS 101)".	A coccosteid.	

=== Invertebrates ===
Color key: Taxon / Reclassified taxon / Taxon falsely reported as present / Dubious taxon or junior synonym / Ichnotaxon / Ootaxon / Morphotaxon	Notes; Uncertain or tentative taxa are in small text; ~~crossed out~~ taxa are discredited.

==== Brachiopods ====
Brachiopods reported from the Four Mile Dam Formation
Genus	Species	Presence	Material	Notes	Images
Douvillina	D. distans	Four Mile Dam, Thunder Bay River, Alpena County, Michigan.		Also found in the Hungry Hollow Formation and Logansport Formation.	
Leptalosia	L. radicans	Four Mile Dam, Thunder Bay River, Alpena County, Michigan.		Also found in the Norway Point, Gravel Point, Alpena and Genshaw formations.	
Longispina	L. emmetensis	Dock Street clay member.		Also found in the Alpena Limestone and Gravel Point Formation.	
Megastrophia	M. gibbosa	Four Mile Dam, Thunder Bay River, Alpena County, Michigan.		Also found in the Hungry Hollow Formation and Logansport Formation.	
Oligorhachis	O. oligorhachis	Four Mile Dam, Thunder Bay River, Alpena County, Michigan.		Also found in the Gravel Point Formation.	
Pentamerella	P. alpenensis	Dock Street clay member.		Also found in the Alpena Limestone and Gravel Point Formation.	
Pentamerella	P. sp. C	Dock Street clay.	A complete specimen.		
Protoleptostrophia	P. lirella	Dock Street clay member.		Also found in the Norway Point Formation and Alpena Limestone.	
Schuchertella	S. anomala	Possibly the Dock Street clay member.		Also found in the Gravel Point Formation.	
Schuchertella	S. sp.	Four Mile Dam, Thunder Bay River, Alpena County, Michigan.			
Spinulicosta	S. mutocosta	Four Mile Dam, Thunder Bay River, Alpena County, Michigan.		Also found in the Bell, Rockport Quarry, Ferron Point, Beebe School, Thunder Bay and Potter Farm formations.	
Strophodonta	S. erratica	Dock Street clay member.		Also found in the Alpena Limestone and Gravel Point Formation.	
Strophodonta	S. fissicosta	Dock Street clay member.		Also found in the upper Gravel Point Formation.	
Strophodonta	S. nanus	Dock Street clay member.		Also found in the Alpena Limestone and Gravel Point Formation.	
Strophodonta	S. paula	Dock Street clay member.		Also found in the Alpena Limestone.	
Strophodonta	S. sp. B	Dock Street clay member and overlying crystalline limestone beds.	Several specimens.		
Rhipidomella	R. penelope traversensis	Thunder Bay River, Alpena County, Michigan.			

==== Corals ====
Corals reported from the Four Mile Dam Formation
Genus	Species	Presence	Material	Notes	Images
Aulocystis	A. cooperi			Also found in the Plum Brook shale, Silica shale and Potter Farm Formation.	
Aulocystis	A. jacksoni	Dock Street clay member.		Also found in the Silica Shale, Ferron Point Formation, Petoskey Formation, Hungry Hollow Formation, Widder Shale, Wanakah shale and Centerfield Limestone.	
Aulopora	A. conferta			Also found in the Bell, Ferron Point, Gravel Point, Genshaw, Alpena, Potter Farm, Petoskey and Hungry Hollow formations.	
Aulopora	A. gregaria			Also found in the Genshaw Formation, Alpena Limestone and Petoskey Formation.	
Pachyphragma	P. concentricum	Dock Street clay member.		Also found in the Ferron Point Formation, Gravel Point Formation and Alpena Limestone.	

==== Gastropods ====
Gastropods reported from the Four Mile Dam Formation
Genus	Species	Presence	Material	Notes	Images
Anematina	A. conica	Upper limestone unit.		An elasmonematid.	
Anematina	A. mellaria	Upper limestone unit.		An elasmonematid, very rare in the Four Mile Dam Limestone.	
Bembexia	B. (Genuspira) nodosa	Upper limestone unit.	About 35 specimens.	An eotomariid and the most abundant gastropod in the formation.	
Dictyobembix	D. bella	Upper limestone unit.	5 specimens.	An eotomariid.	
Mourlonia	M. lirata	Upper limestone unit.		An eotomariid.	
Murchisonia	M. (Murchisonia) subulata	Upper limestone unit.		A murchisoniid, extremely rare in the formation.	
Naticopsis	N. sp.	Upper limestone unit.		A neritopsid, extremely rare in the formation.	
Palaeoscurria?	P.? sp.	Upper limestone unit.	3 poorly preserved ventral molds.	A metoptomatid.	
Platyceras	P. (Platyceras) bartlettense	Dock Street Clay Member.		A platyceratid.	
Platyceras	P. (Euthyrachis) indianense	Dock Street Clay Member.		A platyceratid.	
Platyceras	P. (Orthonychia) variabilis	Upper limestone unit.		A platyceratid.	
Pseudozygopleuridae? Genus A	Genus A sp. A	Upper limestone unit.	Relatively numerous steinkerns.		
Pseudozygopleuridae? Genus B	Genus B sp. B	Upper limestone unit.	One very poorly preserved steinkern with a few small shell patches (YPM 23684).		
Spiroscala	S. sp.	Upper limestone unit.	One specimen (UMMP 47377).	An eotomariid.	
Straparollus	S. (Philoxene) sp.	Upper limestone unit.	3 poorly preserved specimens.	An euomphalid.	
Trepospira	T. (Angyomphalus) bella	Upper limestone unit.		A raphistomatid, very rare in the Four Mile Dam Limestone.	
Turbinilopsis	T. anacarina	Upper limestone unit.	Abundant specimens.	An anomphalid.	

==== Sponges ====
Sponges reported from the Four Mile Dam Formation
Genus	Species	Presence	Material	Notes	Images
Anostylostroma	A. anacolumna	On Thunder Bay River.		A stromatoporoid.	

==== Trilobites ====
Trilobites reported from the Four Mile Dam Formation
Genus	Species	Presence	Material	Notes	Images
Cordania	C. rara				
Dechenella	D. (Monodechenella) macrocephala			Also found in the Hamilton Group.	
Dechenella	D. (Basidechenella) rowi			Also known from the Hamilton Group.	
Eldredgeops	E. rana			Originally reported as Phacops rana. Also found in the Hamilton, Hungry Hollow, Widder, Plum Brook, Prout, Ten Mile Creek, Alpena, Norway Point and Gravel Point formations.	
Greenops	G. aequituberculatus	Dock Street clay member.		Also found in the Norway Point and Gravel Point formations.	
Greenops	G. traversensis	Dock Street clay member.		Also found in the Gravel Point Formation.	
Phacops	P. rana			Reassigned to the genus Eldredgeops.	
Proetus	P. (Crassiproetus) traversensis			Also known from the Gravel Point Formation.	

== See also ==
- List of fossiliferous stratigraphic units in Michigan
