= Norway Point Formation =

Geologic formation in Michigan, United States

- Stratigraphic range: Middle Devonian (Givetian)
- Type: Geological formation
- Unit of: Traverse Group
- Overlies: Four Mile Dam Formation

Location
- Region: Michigan
- Country: United States

The Norway Point Formation is a geologic formation in Michigan. It preserves fossils dating back to the middle Devonian period.

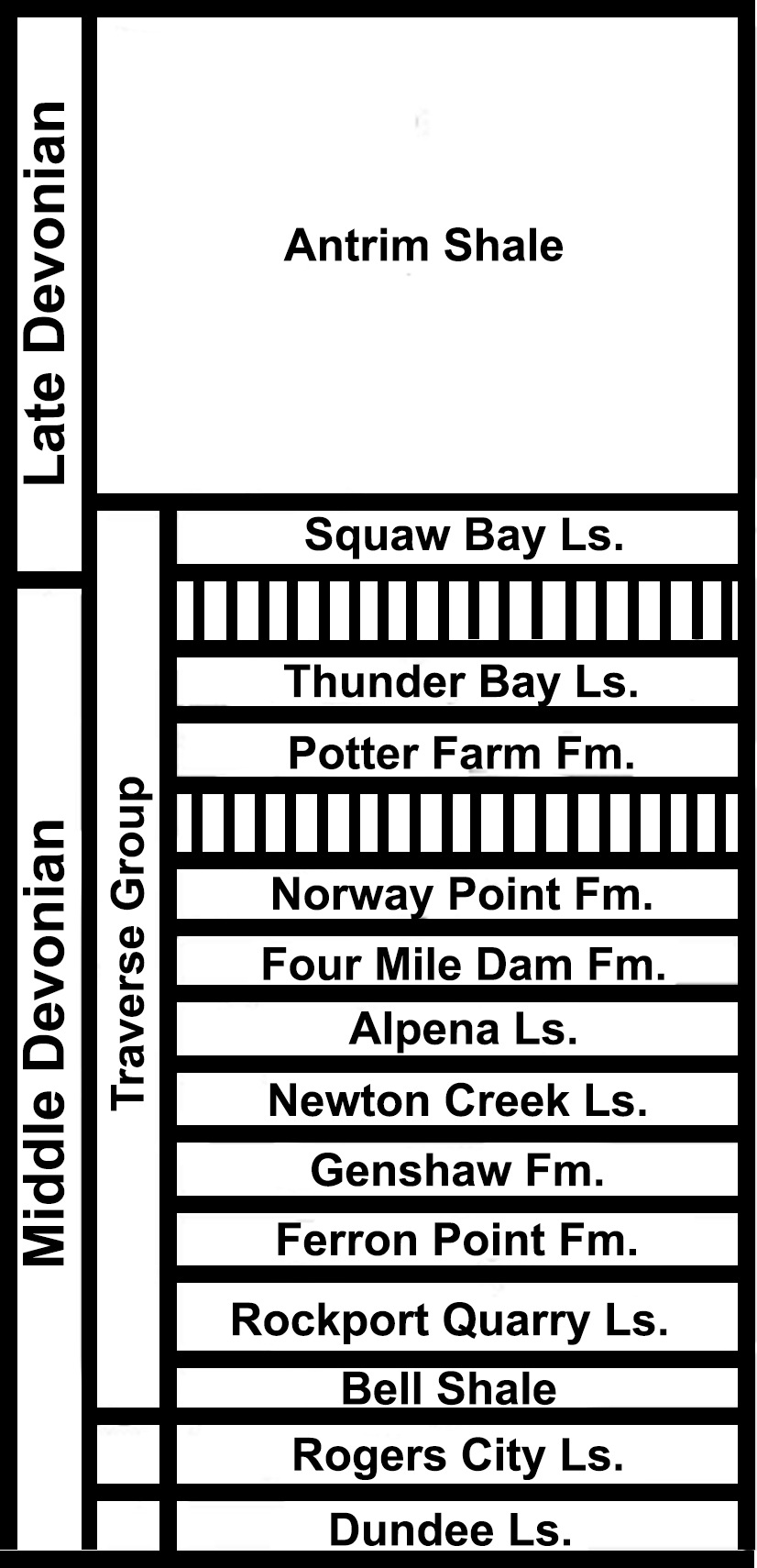
Stratigraphy of the Devonian deposits of the northern part of the Lower Peninsula of Michigan, showing the Norway Point Formation

== Fossil content ==
=== Vertebrates ===
Acanthodians
Genus	Species	Presence	Material	Notes	Images
Oracanthus	O. sp.	"Four Mile Dam, 6 kilometers northwest of Alpena, Alpena County, Michigan".	"A single spine (UMMP 23495)".		

Conodonts
Genus	Species	Presence	Material	Notes	Images
Acodina	A. formosa			Also found in the Detroit River, Traverse, Dundee, Bell, Alpena and Four Mile Dam formations.	
Acodina	A. lanceolata			Also found in the Traverse Formation.	
Belodella	B. devonicus			Also found in the Detroit River, Traverse, Antrim, Alpena and Four Mile Dam formations.	
Hindeodella	H. germana			Also found in the Detroit River, Traverse and Antrim formations.	
Icriodus	I. cymbiformis			Also found in the Detroit River, Traverse, Antrim, Ferron Point, Genshaw, Alpena and Thunder Bay formations.	
Icriodus	I. expansus			Also found in the Detroit River, Traverse, Antrim, Lucas, Anderdon, Dundee, Bell, Ferron Point, Genshaw, Alpena, Potter Farm and Thunder Bay formations.	
Icriodus	I. latericrescens latericrescens			Also found in the Traverse, Bell, Ferron Point, Genshaw, Newton Creek, Alpena, Four Mile Dam, Potter Farm and Thunder Bay formations.	
Ligonodina	L. falciformis			Also found in the Traverse Formation and Alpena Limestone.	
Ozarkodina	O. willsi			Also found in the Detroit River, Traverse, Antrim, Dundee, Alpena and Four Mile Dam formations.	
Polygnathus	P. linguiformis linguiformis			Also found in the Detroit River, Traverse, Antrim, Dundee, Bell and Alpena formations.	
Polygnathus	P. varcus			Also found in the Traverse, Antrim, Alpena, Four Mile Dam and Thunder Bay formations.	
Synprioniodina	S. regularis			Also found in the Detroit River, Traverse, Antrim, Dundee, Bell and Alpena formations.	

=== Invertebrates ===
Color key: Taxon / Reclassified taxon / Taxon falsely reported as present / Dubious taxon or junior synonym / Ichnotaxon / Ootaxon / Morphotaxon	Notes; Uncertain or tentative taxa are in small text; ~~crossed out~~ taxa are discredited.

Brachiopods
Genus	Species	Presence	Material	Notes	Images
Chonetes	C. pachyactis				
Leptalosia	L. radicans			Also found in the Gravel Point, Alpena, Four Mile Dam, Genshaw, Arkona and Hungry Hollow formations.	
Pentamerella	P. pericosta			Also found in the Beebe School, Widder, Hungry Hollow and Logansport formations.	
Pholidostrophia	P. ovata			Also found in the upper Widder Formation.	
Protoleptostrophia	P. lirella			Also found in the Four Mile Dam Formation and Alpena Limestone.	
Schuchertella	S. lirella	At Thunder Bay River.			
Sphenophragmus	S. nanus			Also found in the Beebe School, Ludlowville, Wanakah and Widder formations.	
Strophodonta	S. alpenensis			A strophomenid.	
Truncalosia	T. gibbosa			Also found in the Genshaw, Alpena, Gravel Point, Petoskey, Potter Farm and Arkona formations, and the Hamilton Group.	
Tylothyris	T. subvaricosa			Also found in the Cedar Valley, Milwaukee, Mineola, Bell, Rockport Quarry, Ferron Point, Genshaw, Alpena, Gravel Point and Potter Farm formations.	

Corals
Genus	Species	Presence	Material	Notes	Images
Aulocystis	A. commensalis			Also found in the Ipperwash Limestone and Wanakah Shale.	
Aulocystis	A. stummi	Thunder Bay River below Four Mile Dam, Alpena County, Michigan.			

Ostracods
Genus	Species	Presence	Material	Notes	Images
Aechmina	A. choanobasota		2 right valves.		
Aechmina	A. sp. A		2 right valves.		
Aechmina	A. sp. B		A carapace, No. 29828.		
Arcyzona	A. aperticarinata				
Arcyzona	A. diademata		A carapace and right valve.		
Arcyzona	A. sp.		2 carapaces.		
Barychilina	B. embrithes		A left valve		
Barychilina	B. labyrinthea		A carapace.		
Barychilina	B. sp.		A left valve.		
Birdsallella	B. delawarensis				
Birdsallella	B. tumida				
Bythocypris	B. devonica borealis		A carapace.		
Bythocypris	B. parsonia		A carapace.		
Bythocypris	B. subquadrata		2 carapaces.		
Coelonella	C. scapha		2 carapaces.		
Ctenoloculina	C. cicatricosa				
Dizygopleura	D. euglyphea		A left valve.		
Euglyphella	E. compressa		A right valve.		
Euglyphella	E. sigmoidalis				
Euglyphella	E. simplex				
Eukloedenella	E. doverensis		One female left valve and one male left valve.		
Falsipollex	F. equipapillatus				
Glyptopleura	G. bipunctata				
Halliella	H. bellipuncta		2 right valves.		
Healdia	H. gibba				
Healdia	H. sp.		A right valve.		
Hollinella	H. ampla		A left valve.		
Hollinella	H. inclinisulcata				
Hollinella	H. labrosa		3 right valves.		
Hollinella	H. tendilobata				
Hollinella	H. sp. A		"Two carapaces, Nos. 27352 and 27353".		
Hollinella	H. sp. B		"A male carapace, No. 27354".		
Hyphasmaphora	H. textiligera		2 right valves.		
Jenningsina	J. catenulata				
Jenningsina	J. scalpta		A left valve.		
Lucasella	L. mundula				
Monoceratina	M. casei		"2 carapaces, Nos. 27374 and 27375".		
Octonaria	O. crescentiformis				
Octonaria	O. quadricostata				
Parabolbina	P. acinina		2 male right valves.		
Ponderodictya	P. punctulifera				
Ponderodictya	P. sp.		One specimen (No. 29891).	May be an early instar of P. punctulifera.	
Punctoprimitia	P. subaequalis		1 right valve and 4 left valves.		
Quasillites	Q. binodosus				
Quasillites	Q. jubatus				
Quasillites	Q. lobatus		A right valve.		
Quasillites	Q. obliquus		A carapace.		
Quasillites	Q. cf. Q. ornatus		A carapace.		
Quasillites	Q. ornatus		3 carapaces and a right valve.		
Reticestus	R. acclivitatus				
Ropolonellus	R. papillatus		A right valve.		
Ropolonellus	R. plenus		A right valve.		
Ruptivelum	R. bacculatum				
Subligaculum	S. biorthogonium				
Subligaculum	S. trullatum		2 male left valves and a broken female right valve.		
Tetrasacculus	T. paeneloculatus				
Ulrichia	U. fragilis		1 carapace and 2 left valves.		
Ulrichia	U. spinifera		3 right valves.		

Trilobites
Genus	Species	Presence	Material	Notes	Images
Dechenella	D. (Basidechenella) sp. A		"Nos. 25506, 28719, 28720, and 28721".		
Dipleura	D. dekayi	"Shales just above the Spinocyrtia zone".		Also found in the Thunder Bay Limestone.	
Eldredgeops	E. rana			Originally reported as Phacops rana. Also found in the Hamilton, Hungry Hollow, Widder, Plum Brook, Prout, Ten Mile Creek, Alpena, Four Mile Dam and Gravel Point formations.	
Greenops	G. aequituberculatus			Also found in the Gravel Point Formation and Dock Street clay of the Four Mile Dam Formation.	
Phacops	P. rana			Moved to the genus Eldredgeops.	

== See also ==
- List of fossiliferous stratigraphic units in Michigan

== Bibliography ==
- Various Contributors to the Paleobiology Database. "Fossilworks: Gateway to the Paleobiology Database".
