= Gravel Point Formation =

Geological formation

- Stratigraphic range: Middle Devonian (Givetian)
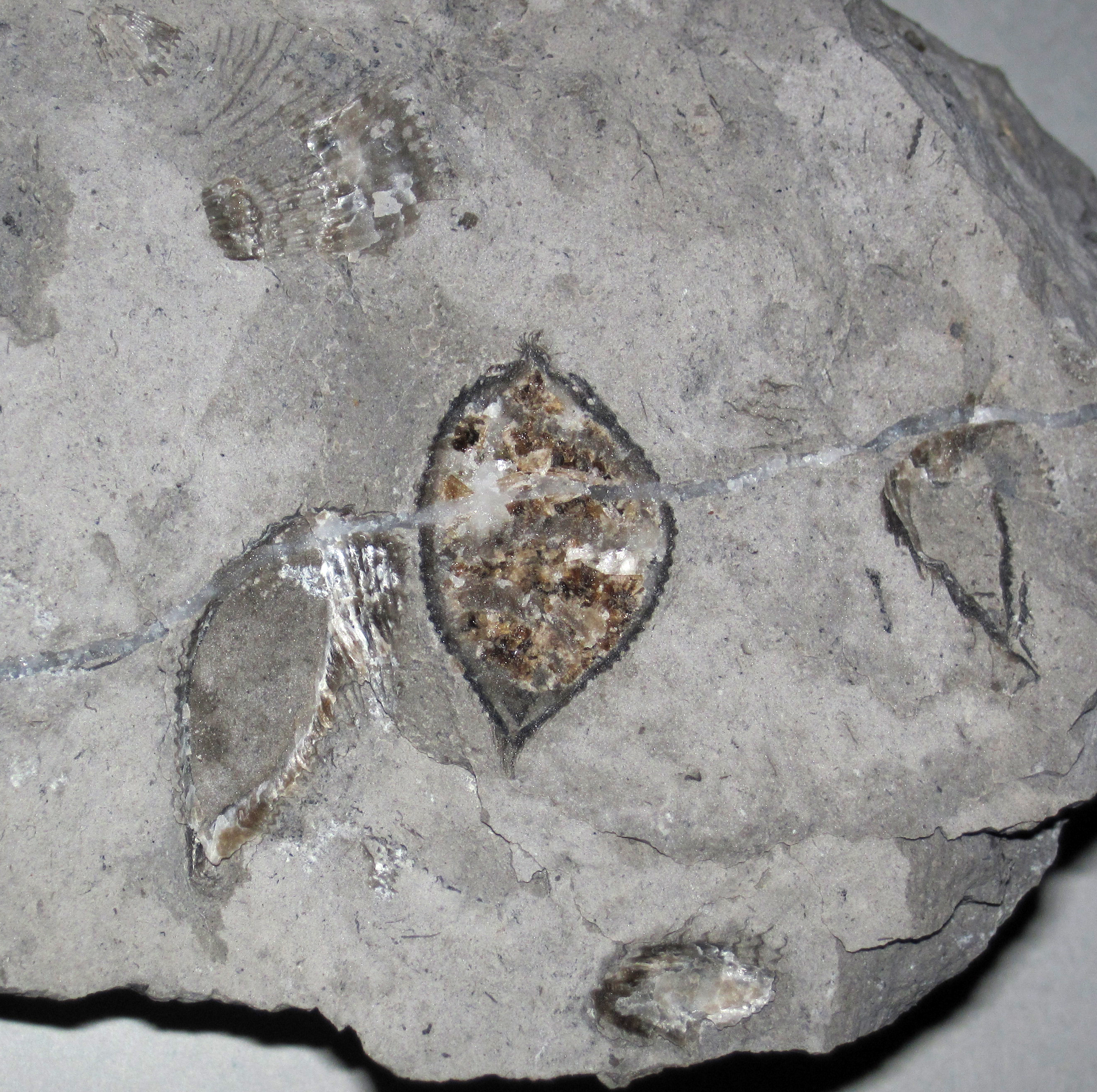
- Fossiliferous limestone from the Gravel Point Formation
- Type: Geological formation
- Unit of: Traverse Group

Lithology
- Primary: Limestone

Location
- Region: Michigan
- Country: United States

The Gravel Point Formation is a geologic formation in western Michigan, United States. It preserves fossils dating back to the middle Devonian period and correlates with the Long Lake Limestone and Alpena Limestone.

== Description ==
The Michigan Basin was a shallow marine shelf during the middle Devonian, located between 30º South and 20º North latitude in central Laurasia. According to stratigraphic and paleontological examination, the sediments of the Gravel Point Formation were deposited in a shallow lagoonal reef environment.

== Fossil content ==
=== Vertebrates ===
==== Acanthodians ====
Acanthodians of the Gravel Point Formation
Genus	Species	Presence	Material	Notes	Images
Gyracanthus	G. sp.	South Point (Gravel Point), Little Traverse Bay, Charlevoix County.	A single specimen (UMMP 1329).	A gyracanthid.	

==== Bony fish ====
Bony fish of the Gravel Point Formation
Genus	Species	Presence	Material	Notes	Images
?Onychodus	?O. sp.	South Point (Gravel Point), Little Traverse Bay, Charlevoix County.	A single specimen (UMMP 14370).	An onychodontiform.	

==== Placoderms ====
Placoderms of the Gravel Point Formation
Genus	Species	Presence	Material	Notes	Images
Holonemiid		South Point (Gravel Point), Little Traverse Bay, Charlevoix County.	A single specimen (UMMP 3129).		

=== Invertebrates ===
Several species of ostracods, an unidentified arthropod 'hook', crinoid columnals and several species of polychaetes and scolecodonts are known from the formation.

==== Brachiopods ====
Brachiopods of the Gravel Point Formation
Genus	Species	Presence	Material	Notes	Images
Atrypa	A. corrugata				
Douvillina	D. sp.	Lower part of the formation.	2 specimens.		
Heteralosia	H. sp. B		2 pedicle valves.		
Leptalosia	L. radicans			Also found in the Norway Point, Alpena, Four Mile Dam, Genshaw, Arkona and Hungry Hollow formations.	
Longispina	L. emmetensis			Also found in the Alpena Limestone and Four Mile Dam Formation.	
Mucrospirifer	M. latus			A spiriferid.	
Mucrospirifer	M. sp.			A spiriferid.	
Oligorhachis	O. oligorhachis			Also found in the Four Mile Dam Formation.	
Orthopleura	O. sp. A	"Large Atrypa zone".	One specimen (U.S.N.M. no. 124258).		
Orthopleura	O. sp. B	"Upper Blue shale".	One specimen (U.S.N.M. no. 124280).		
Pentamerella	P. aftonensis	Gorbut Member.			
Pentamerella	P. alpenensis			Also found in the Alpena Limestone and Four Mile Dam Formation.	
Pentamerella	P. sp. D		A small collection of large shells (the largest being 38 millimeters).		
Pholidostrophia	P. geniculata			Also found in the Alpena, Widder and Hungry Hollow formations.	
Pseudoatrypa	P. keslingi				
Schuchertella	S. anomala			Possibly also found in the Four Mile Dam Formation.	
Strophodonta	S. costata			A strophomenid.	
Strophodonta	S. cf. S. erotica			A strophomenid.	
Strophodonta	S. erratica			Also found in the Alpena Limestone and Four Mile Dam Formation.	
Strophodonta	S. fissicosta	Upper part of the formation.		Also found in the Four Mile Dam Formation.	
Strophodonta	S. nanus			Also found in the Alpena Limestone and Four Mile Dam Formation.	
Strophodonta	S. titan titan			Also known from the Alpena Limestone.	
Truncalosia	T. gibbosa			Also found in the Alpena, Genshaw, Norway Point, Petoskey and Potter Farm formations, the Arkona Shale and the Hamilton Group.	
Tylothyris	T. subvaricosa			Also found in the Cedar Valley, Milwaukee, Mineola, Bell, Rockport Quarry, Ferron Point, Genshaw, Alpena, Norway Point and Potter Farm formations.	

==== Bryozoans ====
Bryozoans of the Gravel Point Formation
Genus	Species	Presence	Material	Notes	Images
Fenestellapolypore	F. magnifica			A fenestellid.	

==== Cnidarians ====
Cnidarians of the Gravel Point Formation
Genus	Species	Presence	Material	Notes	Images
Aulocystis	A. alectiformis			Also found in the Alpena Limestone.	
Aulocystis	A. fenestrata	6 specimens.		Also found in the Alpena Limestone.	
Aulopora	A. conferta			Also found in the Bell, Ferron Point, Genshaw, Alpena, Four Mile Dam, Potter Farm, Petoskey and Hungry Hollow formations.	
Aulopora	A. socialis	Upper part of the formation.			
Favosites	F. mammilatus			A tabulate coral.	
Pachyphragma	P. concentricum			Also found in the Ferron Point, Four Mile Dam and Alpena formations.	
Pachyphragma	P. erectum			Also found in the Potter Farm and Petoskey formations.	

==== Sponges ====
Sponges of the Gravel Point Formation
Genus	Species	Presence	Material	Notes	Images
Parallelopora	P. winchelli			A stromatoporoid.	

==== Tentaculitans ====
Tentaculitans of the Gravel Point Formation
Genus	Species	Presence	Material	Notes	Images
Tentaculites	T. sp.			A tentaculitid.	

==== Trilobites ====
Color key: Taxon / Reclassified taxon / Taxon falsely reported as present / Dubious taxon or junior synonym / Ichnotaxon / Ootaxon / Morphotaxon	Notes; Uncertain or tentative taxa are in small text; ~~crossed out~~ taxa are discredited.

Trilobites of the Gravel Point Formation
Genus	Species	Presence	Material	Notes	Images
Ancyropyge	A. romingeri	"Longispina emmetensis zone".			
Dechenella	D. (Basidechenella) pulchra			Also found in the Alpena Limestone and Dock Street clay of the Four Mile Dam Formation.	
Eldredgeops	E. rana alpenensis			Originally reported as Phacops rana alpenensis. Also found in the Alpena Limestone.	
Greenops	G. aequituberculatus			Also found in the Norway Point and Four Mile Dam formations.	
Greenops	G. traversensis			Also found in the Dock Street clay of the Four Mile Dam Formation.	
Phacops	P. rana alpenensis			Reassigned to the genus Eldredgeops.	
Proetus	P. (Crassiproetus) traversensis			Also found in the Four Mile Dam Formation.	

=== Flora ===
Algal colonies are known from the formation.

==== Acritarchs ====
Acritarchs of the Gravel Point Formation
Genus	Species	Presence	Material	Notes	Images
Lophosphaeridium	L. sp.				
Tasmanites	T. sp.				

==== Plants ====
Plants of the Gravel Point Formation
Genus	Species	Presence	Material	Notes	Images
Ancyrospora	A. sp.		Miospores.		

== See also ==
- List of fossiliferous stratigraphic units in Michigan
