= List of fossiliferous stratigraphic units in Michigan =

This article contains a list of fossil-bearing stratigraphic units in the state of Michigan, U.S.

== Sites ==
Group or Formation	Period	Notes
Antrim Shale	Devonian	
Bass Islands Group	Silurian	
Bill's Creek Shale	Ordovician	
Chandler Falls Formation	Ordovician	
Collingwood Formation	Ordovician	
Cordell Formation	Silurian	
Corniferous Formation	Devonian	
Lucas Formation	Devonian	
Georgian Bay Formation	Ordovician	
Groos Quarry Formation	Ordovician	
Marshall Formation	Carboniferous	
Pointe aux Chenes Formation	Silurian	
Richmond Formation	Ordovician	
Stonington Formation	Ordovician	
Rogers City Formation	Devonian	
Saginaw Group	Devonian - Carboniferous	
Silica Formation	Devonian	
Stonington Formation	Ordovician	
Four Mile Dam Formation	Devonian	
Alpena Formation	Devonian	
Gravel Point Formation	Devonian	
Norway Point Formation	Devonian	
Petosky Limestone	Devonian	
Potter Farm Formation	Devonian	
Thunder Bay Limestone	Devonian	
Trenton Formation	Ordovician	
Waverly Sandstone	Carboniferous	

== See also ==
- Paleontology in Michigan
