= Rockport Quarry Limestone =

Geologic formation in Michigan, United States

- Stratigraphic range: Middle Devonian (Givetian)
- Type: Geological formation
- Unit of: Traverse Group
- Underlies: Ferron Point Formation
- Overlies: Bell Shale
- Thickness: Approximately 14 meters

Location
- Region: Michigan
- Country: United States

The Rockport Quarry Limestone is a geologic formation in Michigan. It preserves fossils dating back to the middle Devonian period.

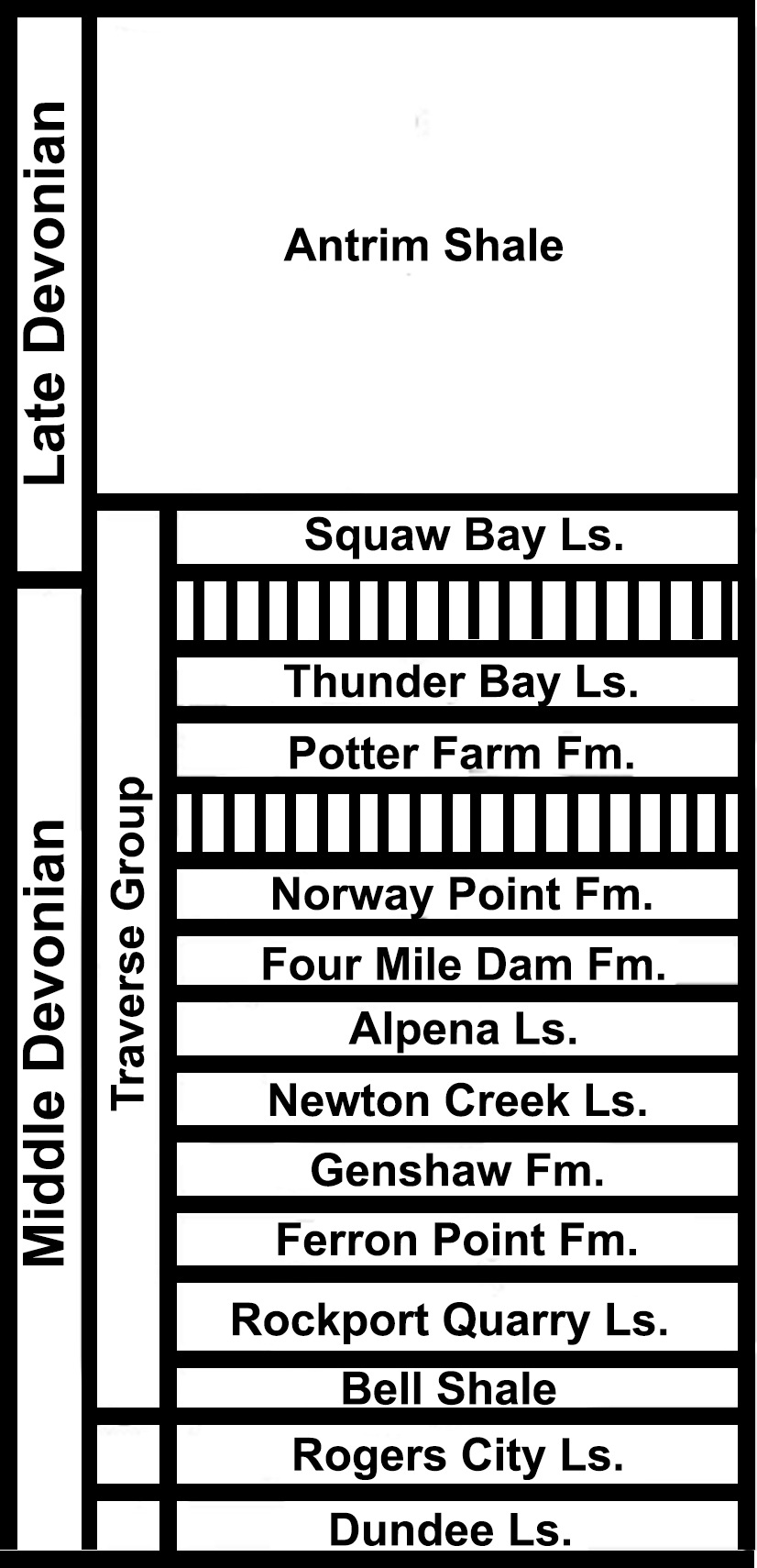
Stratigraphy of the Devonian deposits of the northern part of the Lower Peninsula of Michigan, showing the Rockport Quarry Limestone

== Fossil content ==
Color key: Taxon / Reclassified taxon / Taxon falsely reported as present / Dubious taxon or junior synonym / Ichnotaxon / Ootaxon / Morphotaxon	Notes; Uncertain or tentative taxa are in small text; ~~crossed out~~ taxa are discredited.

=== Vertebrates ===
The Devonian vertebrate fauna of the Rockport Quarry Limestone is the most diverse in Michigan.

==== Acanthodians ====
Acanthodians reported from the Rockport Quarry Limestone
Genus	Species	Presence	Material	Notes	Images
?Machaeracanthus	?M. sp.		A single specimen (UMMP 13047).		

==== Cartilaginous fish ====
Cartilaginous fish reported from the Rockport Quarry Limestone
Genus	Species	Presence	Material	Notes	Images
Phoebodus	P. cf. P. sophiae	Alpena, Michigan.	A tooth.	An early elasmobranch.	
?Tamiobatis	?T. sp.	"At the abandoned Kelly Island Limestone Quarry at Rockport State Park, Alpena County".	A single small spine (UMMP 13147).	A ctenacanthoid.	

==== Placoderms ====
Placoderms reported from the Rockport Quarry Limestone
Genus	Species	Presence	Material	Notes	Images
Dinomylostoma	D. sp.			An arthrodire.	
Dunkleosteus	D. sp.	Rockport Quarry, Alpena County.	A single incomplete right anterior ventrolateral (UMMP 16152).	An arthrodire.	
Holonema	?H. rugosum		A single specimen (UMMP 3898).	An arthrodire.	
Holonema	H. sp.		26 specimens.	An arthrodire.	
Mylostoma	M. sp.		A single specimen (UMMP 13612).	An arthrodire.	
Placodermi		At the abandoned Kelly Island Limestone Quarry at Rockport State Park, Alpena County.	2 specimens (7M, VP. 522.)	Placoderms of unknown affinity.	
Protitanichthys	P. rockportensis		59 specimens.	An arthrodire.	
Ptyctodus	P. sp.		A single specimen (UMMP 13045).	A ptyctodontid.	

=== Invertebrates ===
==== Brachiopods ====
Brachiopods reported from the Rockport Quarry Limestone
Genus	Species	Presence	Material	Notes	Images
Chonetes	C. mediolatus			Also found in the Bell Shale, Ferron Point Formation and St. Laurent Limestone.	
Pentamerella	P. sp. B	Basal 8 inches of the formation.	2 specimens.		
Pholidostrophia	P. gracilis gracilis			Also found in the Bell, Ferron Point and Genshaw formations.	
Schizophoria	S. ferronensis	Basal 8 inches of the formation.		Also found in the Bell Shale, Ferron Point Formation and Silica Shale.	
Schuchertella	S. crassa			Also found in the lower Bell Shale, Ferron Point Formation and Arkona Shale.	
Spinulicosta	S. mutocosta			Also found in the Bell, Ferron Point, Four Mile Dam, Beebe School, Thunder Bay and Potter Farm formations.	
Strophodonta	S. extenuata rockportensis	Lower 8 inches of the formation.			
Tylothyris	T. rockportensis			Appears to be endemic to the Michigan Basin.	
Tylothyris	T. subvaricosa			Also found in the Cedar Valley, Milwaukee, Mineola, Bell, Ferron Point, Genshaw, Alpena, Gravel Point, Norway Point and Potter Farm formations.	

==== Bryozoans ====
Bryozoans reported from the Rockport Quarry Limestone
Genus	Species	Presence	Material	Notes	Images
Fenestellidae	Species A				
Fenestellidae	Species B				
Fenestellidae	Species C				
Trepostomata	Species A				
Trepostomata	Species B				

==== Crustaceans ====
Crustaceans reported from the Rockport Quarry Limestone
Genus	Species	Presence	Material	Notes	Images
Ostracoda					
Phlyctiscapha	P. rockportensis	Basal part of the formation.		An ostracod.	

==== Echinoderms ====
Echinoderms reported from the Rockport Quarry Limestone
Genus	Species	Presence	Material	Notes	Images
Crinoidea			"Observed as disaggregated ossicles, ossicles stacked en echellon, and fragments of columnals".		

==== Molluscs ====
Molluscs reported from the Rockport Quarry Limestone
Genus	Species	Presence	Material	Notes	Images
Cephalopoda			"All specimens collected as single-hand specimens".		
Gastropoda					

==== Sponges ====
Sponges reported from the Rockport Quarry Limestone
Genus	Species	Presence	Material	Notes	Images
Clathrodictyidae					
Idiostromatidae					
Stromatoporidae					

==== Trilobitomorphs ====
Trilobitomorphs reported from the Rockport Quarry Limestone
Genus	Species	Presence	Material	Notes	Images
Trilobitomorpha		200 m south of the large sinkhole on the west wall of Rockport Quarry.			

=== Plants and algae ===
Plants and algae reported from the Rockport Quarry Limestone
Genus	Species	Presence	Material	Notes	Images
Calcisphera	C. sp. A	"Abandoned quarry of the Onaway Limestone Company on the shore of Black Lake".			
Calcisphera	C. sp. B	"Abandoned quarry of the Onaway Limestone Company on the shore of Black Lake".			
Rhodophyta	Indeterminate	200 m south of the large sinkhole on the west wall of Rockport Quarry.			
Vermiporella			"Observed as transverse sections, most specimens now irregular in shape due to crushing".		

=== Cyanophytes ===
Cyanophytes reported from the Rockport Quarry Limestone
Genus	Species	Presence	Material	Notes	Images
Genus and species indeterminate	Indeterminate		"Spherical bodies 3-5 microns in diameter".		
Oncolite				"Some post-depositional crushing of the sample has occurred".	
Renalcis		"Abandoned quarry of the Onaway Limestone Company on the shore of Black Lake".			

=== Foraminifera ===
Foraminifera reported from the Rockport Quarry Limestone
Genus	Species	Presence	Material	Notes	Images
Family indet.			"Found sparsely as solitary individuals in 6 specimens".		
Nodosinellidae					

== See also ==
- List of fossiliferous stratigraphic units in Michigan
