= Squaw Bay Limestone =

Geologic formation in Michigan, United States

- Stratigraphic range: Givetian-Frasnian; ~387.7–372.2 Ma
- Type: Geological formation
- Unit of: Traverse Group
- Underlies: Antrim shale
- Overlies: Thunder Bay Limestone
- Thickness: 10 metres (33 ft)

Lithology
- Primary: limestone
- Other: mudstone

Location
- Region: Michigan
- Country: United States

Type section
- Named for: Squaw Bay (Michigan)

Squaw Bay Limestone (referred to as the Traverse Formation in older literature) is a geologic formation in Michigan. It is a part of the Traverse Group, which preserves fossils dating to the Middle to Late Devonian. It is the uppermost formation in the group, overlying the Thunder Bay Limestone and underlying the Antrim shale. It preserves a marine environment in the last section of the area's transition from an oxygen-rich shallow carbonate platform to an oxygen-poor deep sea floor. Though most well known for the diversity of conodonts, the formation also contains fossils from other groups such as cephalopods and brachiopods.

== Discovery and Naming ==
The Squaw Bay Limestone was originally named in 1943 by Warthin and Cooper. Being based on the type locality located in the Squaw Bay, renamed the Birdsong Bay in 2022, of Lake Heron. The original exposure was 1 m thick and was made up of brown limestone. This, however, wasn't the first time beds of the formation had been published on. In 1938, Miller had described a section now referred to as the Koenenites beds as an "unnamed limestone at the base of the Antrim Formation.". Most of the limestone, however, is underwater with only the upper layers of the formation being accessible with the water levels are lower. The major collection of about 9 kg of limestone was done by Cooper in the early summer of 1953 during a period of low water. Though not the current consensus, the formation was at one point thought to represent a much more shallow environment, specifically a coastal swamp.

== Description ==
The Squaw Bay Limestone is the uppermost formation of the Traverse Group, overlying the Thunder Bay Limestone and underlying the Antrim Shale. The contact between Squaw Bay and Thunder Bay is located in a lowland swamp while its contact with the Antrim Shale is located at the Paxton Quarry in Alpina, Michigan. The formation as a whole is relatively thin, having an average thickness of 3 m but reaching 10 m thick in some places. Even with this being the case, the Squaw Bay Limestone is made up of 3 distinct beds being the Zoophycos bed, Molluscan bed, and the Calcareous mudstone bed.

=== Zoophycos Bed ===
The Zoophycos Bed is the lowermost section of the formation, being made up of olive to brownish-gray dolomitic limestone containing pyrite or limonite depending on the section. The bed as a whole is around 0.7 m thick with only the upper 0.5 m being exposed as a pavement. The bed contains a large amount of Zoophycos along with a small amount of vertical Skolithos on the top surface.

=== Molluscan Bed ===
The Molluscan Beds represent the small amount of limestone layers present at the upper section of the formation, being present on the edges of the beach and under the water of the bay. The limestone itself is brown and irregular bedding is present. As the name suggests, the Molluscan bed preserves a large amount of mollusks, mostly being made up of a low-diversity assemblage of cephalopods. There is almost no sessile-benthic fauna preserved at the bed, excluding a single agglutinated tube potentially coming from some sort of annelid. At the type locality of the formation, there is also a large diversity of conodonts preserved.

=== Calcareous Mudstone Bed ===
The Calcareous Mudstone Bed is the uppermost bed of the formation, only being present at the Paxton Quarry near the contact with the Antrim Shale. It is at least 1.5 m thick, mostly being made up of green calcareous mudstone. A large amount of conodonts are present in the argillaceous limestone which is present in the forms of interbedding and thin lenses. This bed is the only section of the formation that dates to the Late Devonian.

== Paleobiota ==
=== Conodonta ===
Genus	Species	Notes	Image
Ancyrodella	A. rotundiloba		
Angulodus	A. demissus		
Bryantodus	B. colligatus		
Bryantodus	B. curvatus		
Bryantodus	B. multidens		
Bryantodus	B. radiatus		
Centrognathodus	C. sp		
Diplododella	D. aurita?		
Enantiognathus	E. lipperti		
Hibbardella	H. cf. separata		
Hindeodella	H. alternata		
Hindeodella	H. subtilis		
Ligonodina	L. aff. L. recedens		
Ligonodina	L?. sp		
Ligonodina	L. recedens		
Lonchodina	L. cooperi		
Lonchodina	L. curta		
Neoprioniodus	N. alatus		
Neoprioniodus	N. pronus		
Ozarkodina	O. immersa		
Polygnathus	?P. ancyrognathoideus		
Polygnathus	P. dengleri		
Polygnathus	P. dubius		
Polygnathus	P. pennatus		
Prioniodina	P. nasuta		

=== Mollusca ===
Genus	Species	Notes	Image
Bactrites	B. warthini		
Buchiola	B. sp		
Diaphorostoma	D. pugnus		
Koenenites	K. cooperi		
Praecardium	P. sp		
Tornoceras	T. arcuatum		
Tornoceras	T. uniangulare		

=== Tentaculita ===
Genus	Species	Notes	Image
Styliolina	S. fissurella		

== Paleoenvironment ==
Throughout the Traverse Group, there is a general transition between a shallow carbonate platform and a deep water sea floor with the Squaw Bay Limestone representing the end of this transition. Even with this transition being in place, there is also evidence of a rise in sea level which would have resulted in a stop to carbonate depositions. Within the contact of the limestone with the overlying shale, there is bedding present that suggests periodic deposition of a large amount of sediment coming from a prodelta in a deep water environment. This sediment was overall deposited as a result of a major tectonic event with the sediment coming from the Appalachian highlands. Estimates of the depth that this event would have been taken place range from 150–200 meters. Due to the fauna lacking sessile-benthic members, it has been suggested that the area's stratified water would have lacked a large amount of oxygen that would have made it harder for the sea-floor dwelling animals to survive.
