= Long Lake Limestone =

Geologic formation in Michigan, United States

- Stratigraphic range: Middle Devonian
- Type: Formation
- Unit of: Traverse Group
- Sub-units: Killians Member and Genshaw Member
- Underlies: Alpena Limestone
- Overlies: Ferron Point Formation

Location
- Region: Michigan
- Country: United States

The Long Lake Limestone is a geologic formation in Michigan. It preserves fossils dating back to the Devonian period.
