= Saginaw Group =

Geological Group in Michigan

- Stratigraphic range: Carboniferous
- Type: Group

Location
- Region: Michigan
- Country: United States

The Saginaw Group is a geologic group in Michigan composed of sedimentary rock deposited during the Pennsylvanian Period (circa 323.2 million years ago to 298.9 million years ago. Saginaw group rocks include sandstone, shale, coal, and limestone of fresh water, brackish, and marine origin. Fossils dating back to the Penssylvanian Period (Late or Upper Carboniferous period) can be found in Saginaw Group formations.

== See also ==
- List of fossiliferous stratigraphic units in Michigan
