= Phanerotrematidae =

Scientific classification
- Kingdom: Animalia
- Phylum: Mollusca
- Class: Gastropoda
- Subclass: Vetigastropoda
- Order: Pleurotomariida
- Superfamily: †Eotomarioidea
- Family: †Phanerotrematidae; Knight, 1956

Extinct family of gastropods

Phanerotrematidae is an extinct family of fossil sea snails, marine gastropod mollusks in the clade Vetigastropoda (according to the taxonomy of the Gastropoda by Bouchet & Rocroi, 2005). This family has no subfamilies.
