= Groos Quarry Formation =

Geologic formation in Michigan, United States

- Stratigraphic range: Ordovician
- Type: Formation
- Unit of: Trenton Group

Location
- Region: Michigan
- Country: United States

The Groos Quarry Formation is a geologic formation in Michigan. It preserves fossils dating back to the Ordovician period.

== See also ==
- List of fossiliferous stratigraphic units in Michigan
