= Stonington Formation =

Geologic formation in Michigan

- Stratigraphic range: Late Ordovician
- Type: Formation
- Unit of: Richmond Group (geology)
- Sub-units: Ogontz Member and Bay de Noc Member
- Underlies: Big Hill Formation
- Overlies: Bill's Creek Shale

Location
- Region: Michigan
- Country: United States

The Stonington Formation is a geologic formation in Michigan. It preserves fossils dating back to the Ordovician period.

== See also ==
- List of fossiliferous stratigraphic units in Michigan
