= Arkonips =

Arkonips Temporal range: Middle Devonian

Scientific classification
- Domain: Eukaryota
- Kingdom: Animalia
- Phylum: Annelida
- Clade: Pleistoannelida
- Subclass: Errantia
- Order: Phyllodocida
- Genus: †Arkonips
- Species: †A. topororum

Binomial name
- †Arkonips topororum Farrell & Briggs 2007

Extinct genus of annelid worms

Arkonips is a Devonian polychaete known from the pyritized specimens in the Hungry Hollow Formation of Ontario, Canada.
