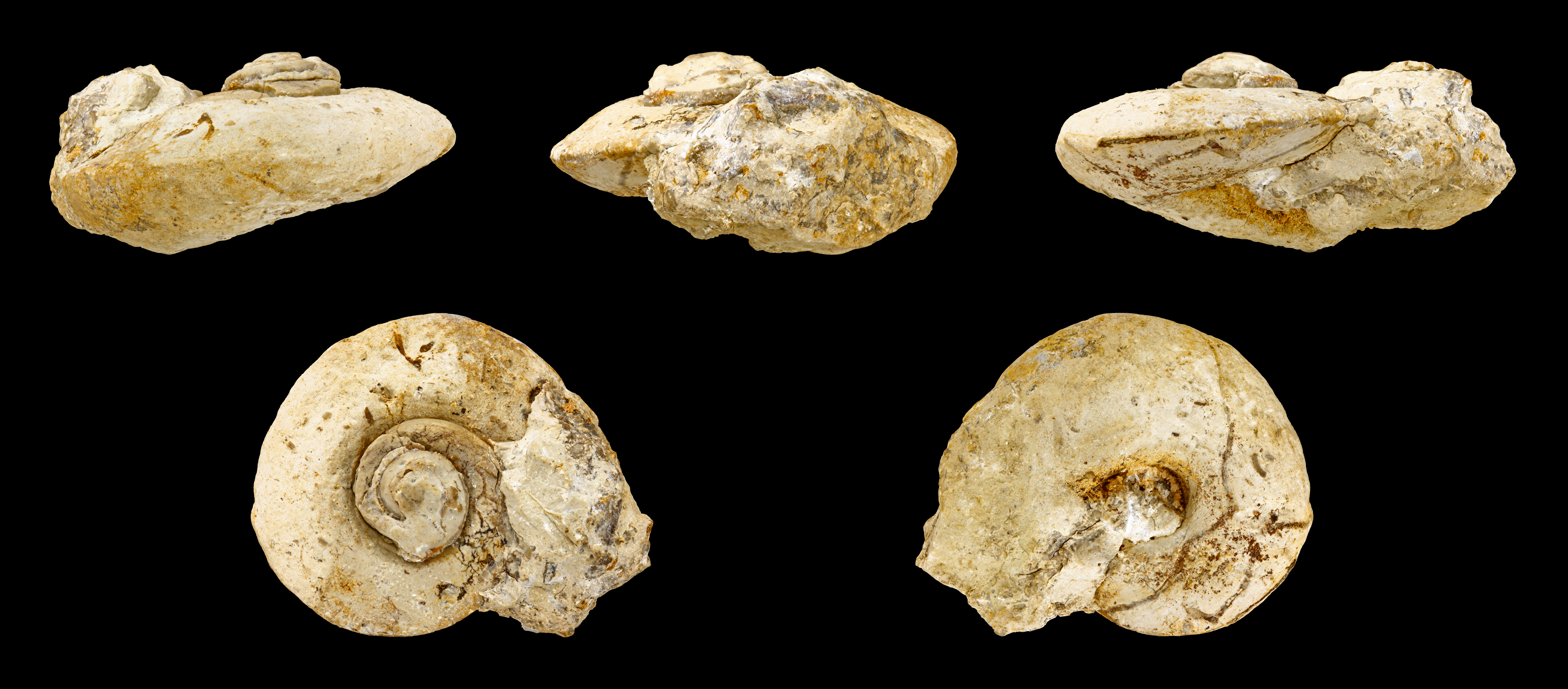
- Liospira angustata

Scientific classification
- Kingdom: Animalia
- Phylum: Mollusca
- Class: Gastropoda
- Subclass: Vetigastropoda
- Order: Pleurotomariida
- Suborder: †Murchisoniina
- Superfamily: †Eotomarioidea; Wenz, 1938

= Eotomarioidea =

Extinct superfamily of gastropods

Eotomarioidea is an extinct superfamily of small to large sea snails, marine gastropod mollusks in the clade Vetigastropoda.

== Taxonomy ==
- Family Eotomariidae Wenz, 1938
- Family Gosseletinidae Wenz, 1938
- Family Luciellidae Knight, 1956
- Family Phanerotrematidae Knight, 1956
