= Richmond Formation =

Geologic formation in Michigan and Ohio

- Stratigraphic range: Ordovician
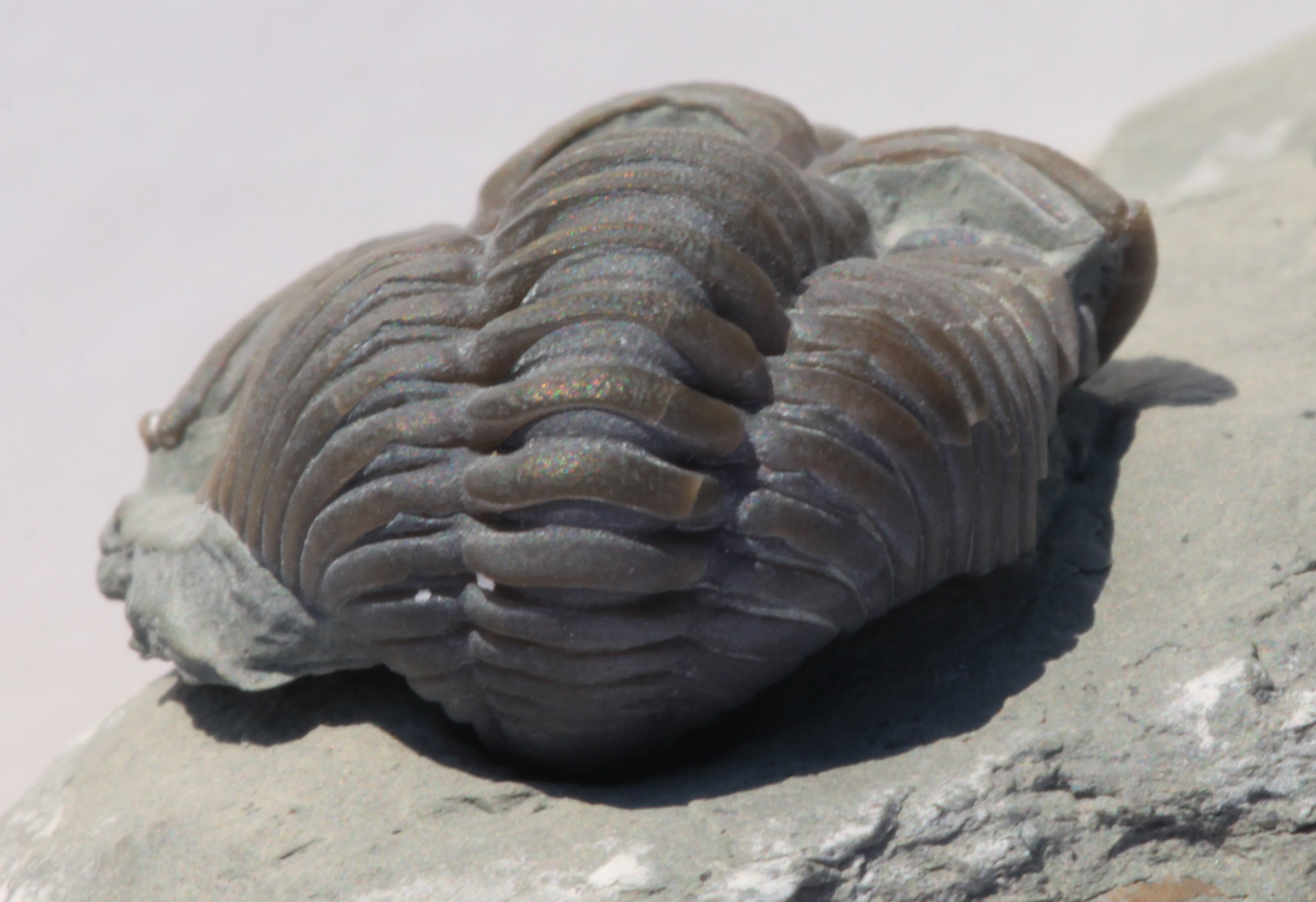
- Fossil from the Richmond Formation (Ohio)
- Type: Formation

Location
- Region: Michigan, Ohio
- Country: United States

The Richmond Formation is a geologic formation in Michigan and Ohio. It preserves fossils dating back to the Ordovician period.

== See also ==
- List of fossiliferous stratigraphic units in Michigan
