= Collingwood Shale =

Geologic formation in Michigan

- Stratigraphic range: Middle Ordovician
- Type: Formation
- Underlies: Bill's Creek Shale
- Overlies: Trenton Formation

Location
- Region: Michigan
- Country: United States

The Collingwood Formation is a geologic formation in Michigan. It preserves fossils dating back to the Ordovician period.

== See also ==
- List of fossiliferous stratigraphic units in Michigan
