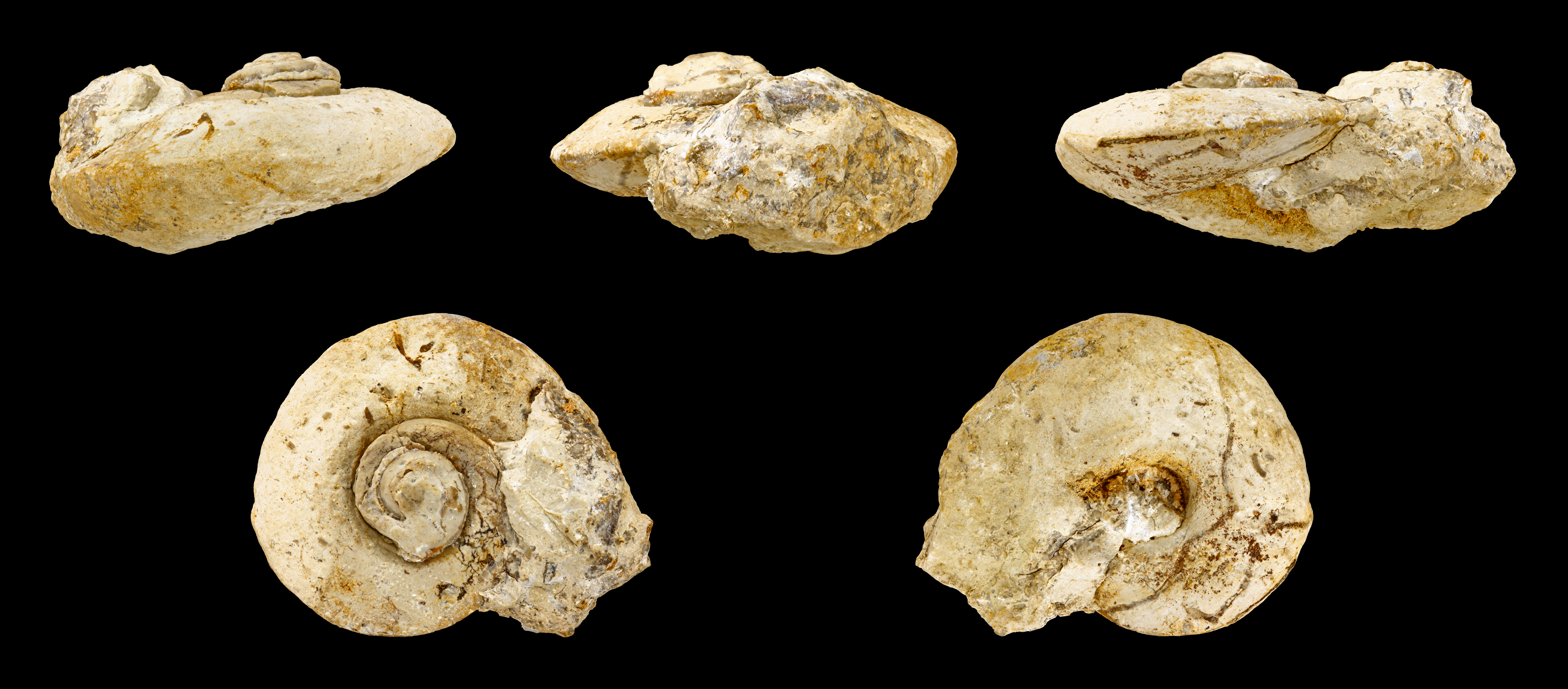
- Liospira angustata Ulrich & Scofield, 1897

Scientific classification
- Kingdom: Animalia
- Phylum: Mollusca
- Class: Gastropoda
- Subclass: Vetigastropoda
- Order: Pleurotomariida
- Superfamily: †Eotomarioidea
- Family: †Eotomariidae; Wenz, 1938

= Eotomariidae =

Extinct family of gastropods

Eotomariidae is an extinct family of gastropods in the clade Vetigastropoda (according to the taxonomy of the Gastropoda by Bouchet & Rocroi, 2005).

== Taxonomy ==
This family consists of the following subfamilies (according to the taxonomy of the Gastropoda by Bouchet & Rocroi, 2005):

- Eotomariinae Wenz, 1938
  - Eotomariini Wenz, 1938 - synonym: Liospirinae Knight, 1956
  - Deseretospirini Gordon & Yochelson, 1987
  - Glabrocingulini Gordon & Yochelson, 1987
- Ptychomphalinae Wenz, 1938
  - Ptychomphalini Wenz, 1938
  - Mourloniini Gordon & Dutro, 1960
- Neilsoniinae Knight, 1956
  - Neilsoniini Knight, 1956
  - Spirovallini Waterhouse, 2001

== Genera ==
Genera within the family Eotomariidae include:

Eotomariinae

- Bembexia Oehlert, 1888

tribe Eotomariini

- Eotomaria Ulrich & Scoffield, 1897
  - Eotomaria sublaevis Ulrich, 1897

- Glabrocingulum Thomas, 1940 - but also being classified within the family Gosseletinidae
- Takfaia Ketwetsuriya, Nützel & Kanjanapayont, 2016
  - Takfaia kuesi Ketwetsuriya, Nützel & Kanjanapayont, 2016
- Kamupena Speden, 1962
  - Kamupena greggi Speden 1962
- Paraliospira Rohr, 1980
- Semizona Ebbestad & Peel, 2001
  - Semizona bella Ebbestad & Peel, 2001
  - Semizona glindmeyeri Rohr, 1996
