= Bembexia =

Scientific classification
- Kingdom: Animalia
- Phylum: Mollusca
- Class: Gastropoda
- Subclass: Vetigastropoda
- Order: Pleurotomariida
- Family: †Eotomariidae
- Genus: †Bembexia; Oehlert & Oehlert 1888

Species
- See text.

Genus of gastropods

† Bembexia is a genus of fossil sea snails, marine gastropod mollusks. This genus is placed in the subfamily Eotomariinae, of the family Eotomariidae. The shell characters resemble those of Balbinipleura. These snails have been interpreted as herbivorous, probably grazing on algae.

These fossils are found in sedimentary rocks deposited from 340 to 420 million years ago, including the Hamilton Group of eastern North America. Other fossil sites include Alaska, Western Europe including the UK, Venezuela, China and Australia.

== Species ==
Species within the genus Bembexia include:

- Bembexia adjutor
- Bembexia babini
- Bembexia chapernowni
- Bembexia crenatostriata
- Bembexia disjuncta
- Bembexia gradilispira
- Bembexia headillus
- Bembexia insolita
- Bembexia inumbilicata
- Bembexia laevis
- Bembexia larteti
- Bembexia micula
- Bembexia minima
- Bembexia neapolitana
- Bembexia planidorsalis
- Bembexia procteri
- Bembexia seminuda
- Bembexia testis
