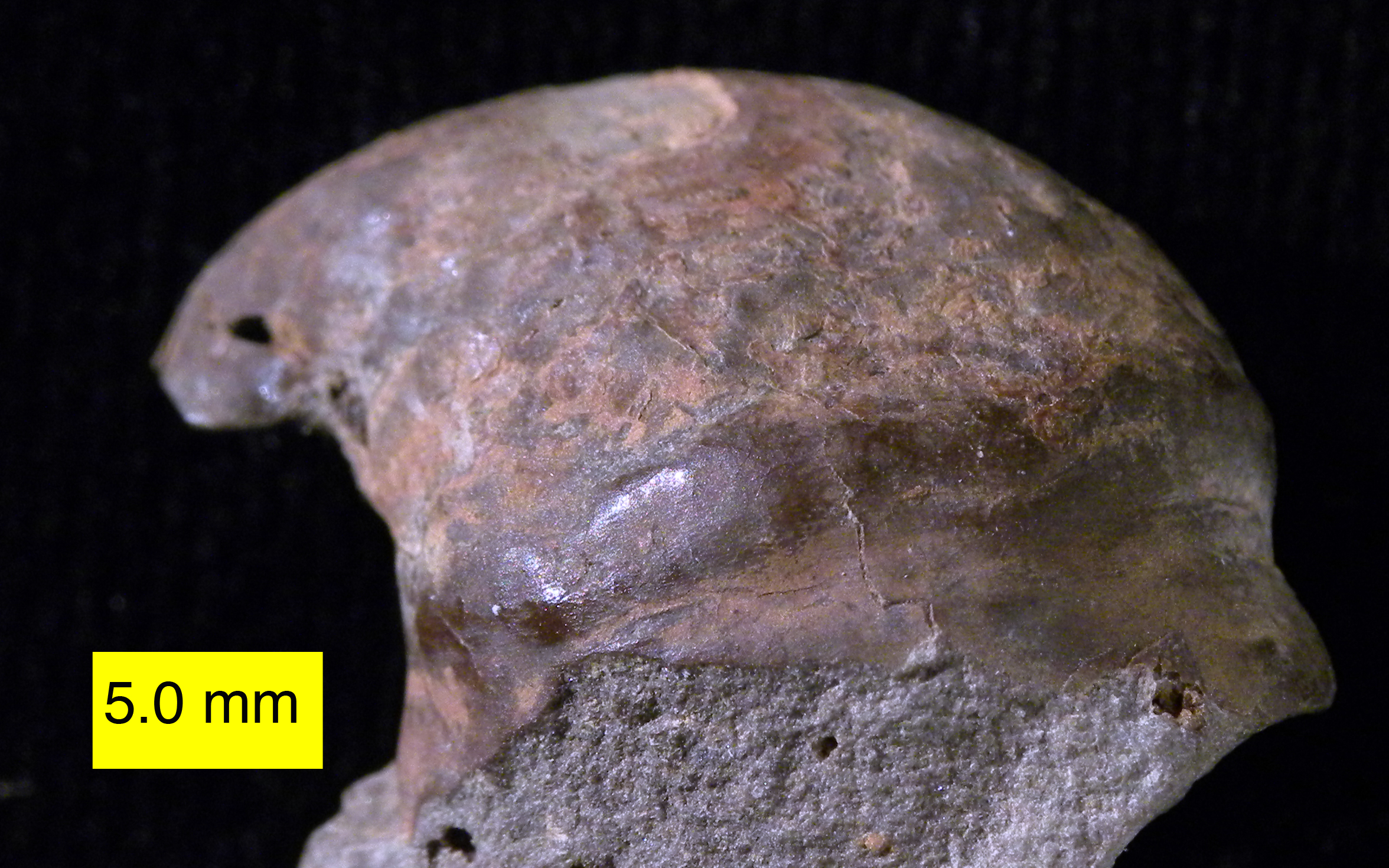
- Platyceras pulcherrimum from the Logan Formation (Mississippian) of Wooster, Ohio)

Scientific classification
- Kingdom: Animalia
- Phylum: Mollusca
- Class: Gastropoda
- Order: incertae sedis
- Family: †Platyceratidae
- Genus: †Platyceras; Conrad, 1840

Synonyms
- Acroculia Phillips 1841; Actita Fahrenkohl 1844

= Platyceras =

Platyceras Temporal range: Silurian-Middle Triassic ~439–221 Ma

Extinct genus of gastropods

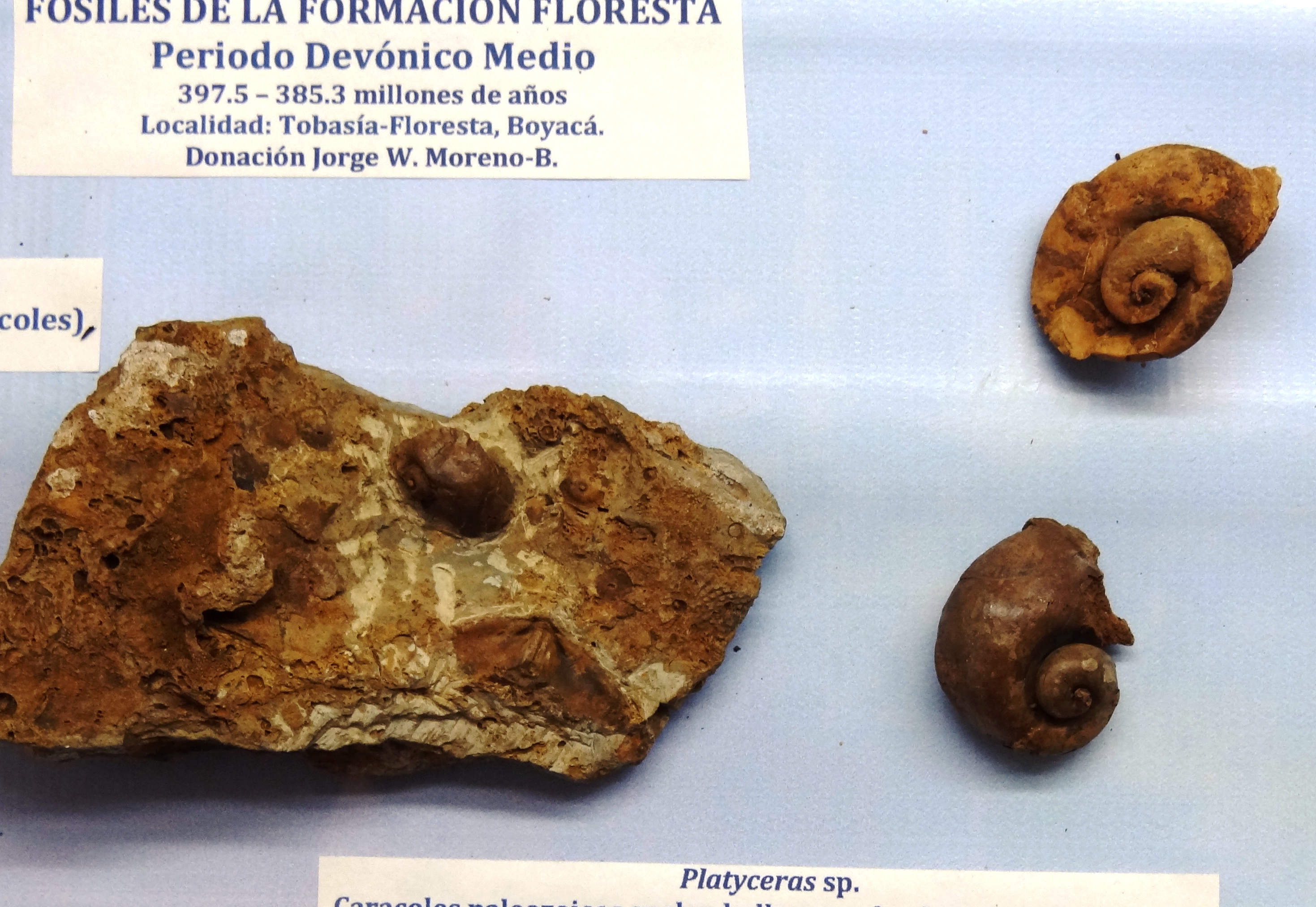
Fossils of Platyceras sp. from Floresta, Boyacá, Colombia

Platyceras is a genus of extinct Paleozoic sea snails, marine gastropod mollusks in the family Platyceratidae. This genus is known from the Silurian to the Middle Triassic periods and especially abundant in the Devonian and Carboniferous. It is the type genus of the family Platyceratidae.

== Description ==
Platyceras has a distinctive, curved conical shape that is easily recognized. The cap-like shell is high and broad anteriorly. The posterior portion of the shell, at the apex, is usually slightly coiled in an asymmetrical fashion. Frequently, the front portions of the shells are broken, though the posterior sections are relatively well preserved. Platyceras is particularly abundant in Devonian deposits (416 million to 359 million years old). Platyceras and other platyceratid gastropods are known for the complex symbiotic relationships they had with crinoids.

== Distribution ==
Fossils of Platyceras have been found all over the world, among others in the Silurian Bertie Formation of Ontario and New York and the Devonian Floresta Formation of Boyacá, Colombia.
