= Logansport Formation =

Geologic formation in Louisiana, United States

- Stratigraphic range: Paleogene
- Type: Formation
- Unit of: Midway Group
- Underlies: Sabinetown Formation
- Overlies: Neberton Formation

Location
- Region: Louisiana
- Country: United States

The Logansport Formation is a geologic formation in Louisiana. It preserves fossils dating back to the Paleogene period.

== See also ==
- List of fossiliferous stratigraphic units in Louisiana
- Paleontology in Louisiana
