= Chandler Falls Formation =

Geologic formation in Michigan, U.S.

- Stratigraphic range: Ordovician
- Type: Formation

Location
- Region: Michigan
- Country: United States

The Chandler Falls Formation is a geologic formation in Michigan. It preserves fossils dating back to the Ordovician period.
