= Metoptomatidae =

Scientific classification
- Kingdom: Animalia
- Phylum: Mollusca
- Class: incertae sedis
- Family: †Metoptomatidae; Wenz, 1938

Genera
- See text

Extinct family of gastropods

Metoptomatidae is an extinct family of fossil molluscs from the Paleozoic era. These molluscs are either (Gastropoda or Monoplacophora).

== Taxonomy ==
The taxonomy of the Gastropoda by Bouchet & Rocroi, 2005 categorizes Metoptomatidae within the Paleozoic molluscs of uncertain systematic position. This family is unassigned to superfamily. This family has no subfamilies.

== Genera ==
Genera in the family Metoptomatidae include:

- Metoptoma Philips, 1836, the type genus of the family Metoptomatidae
- Calloconus Perner, 1903
- Palaeoscurria Perner, 1903
