= Acondylacanthus =

Acondylacanthus Temporal range: Frasnian– Pennsylvanian

Scientific classification
- Kingdom: Animalia
- Phylum: Chordata
- Class: Chondrichthyes
- Subclass: Elasmobranchii
- Order: †Ctenacanthiformes
- Family: †Ctenacanthidae
- Genus: †Acondylacanthus; St. John & Worthen, 1875

Species
- A. gracilis; A. nuperus; A. jaekeli; A. colei; A. attenuatus; A. tenuistriatus; A. tuberculatus; A. mudgianus; A. distans; A. aeuicostatus; A. gracillimus; A. browni

Extinct genus of Euselachian shark

Acondylacanthus is an extinct genus of ctenacanthiform from the Paleozoic era. The type species is A. gracilis. Most species are known from the Carboniferous of America and the British isles. A. jaekeli is known from the upper Frasnian of Germany and the Upper Famennian of Russia. This genus is based entirely upon isolated dorsal fin spines, and thus may later be found synonymous with tooth-based genera. Many species have been ascribed to this genus, though there has been some confusion with Ctenachanthus. This genus is in need of review and research.
