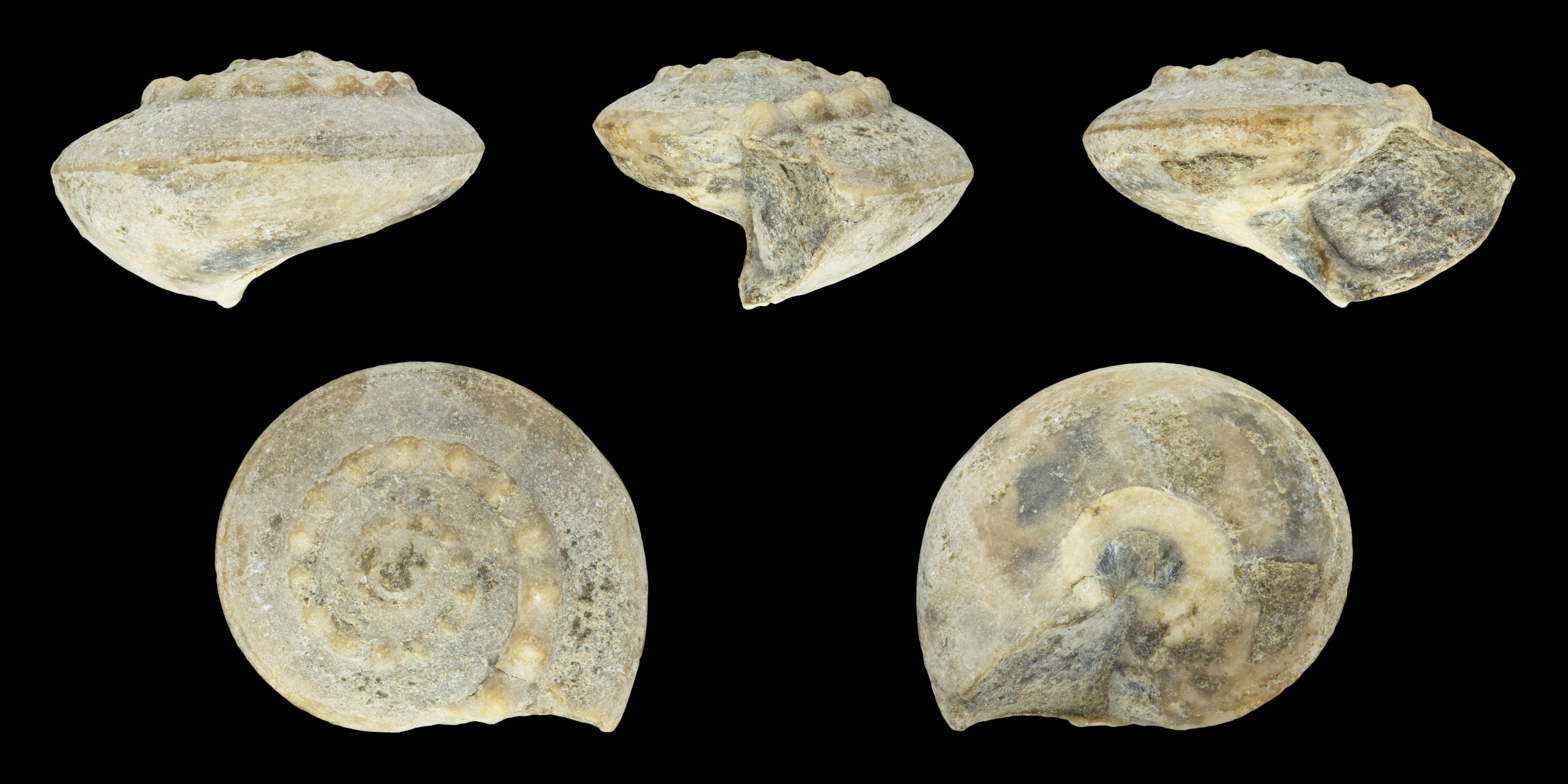
- Trepospira discoidalis Newell 1935

Scientific classification
- Kingdom: Animalia
- Phylum: Mollusca
- Class: Gastropoda
- Subclass: Vetigastropoda
- Order: Pleurotomariida
- Superfamily: †Eotomarioidea
- Family: †Gosseletinidae; Wenz, 1938

= Gosseletinidae =

Extinct family of gastropods

Gosseletinidae is an extinct family of sea snails, marine gastropod molluscs in the clade Vetigastropoda (according to the taxonomy of the Gastropoda by Bouchet & Rocroi, 2005).

== Genera ==
Genera within the family Glosseletinidae include:

- Balbinipleura
- Glabrocingulum
- Globodoma
- Glyptomaria
- Gosseletina
- Kirchneriella
- Nodulispira
- Promourionia
- Trepospira
