= Waverly Sandstone =

Geologic formation in Michigan, United States

- Stratigraphic range: Carboniferous
- Type: Formation

Location
- Region: Michigan
- Country: United States

The Waverly Sandstone is a geologic formation in Michigan. It preserves fossils dating back to the Carboniferous period.
