= Bill's Creek Shale =

Geologic formation in Michigan, US

- Stratigraphic range: Middle Ordovician - Late Ordovician
- Type: Formation
- Underlies: Stonington Formation
- Overlies: Collingwood Shale

Location
- Region: Michigan
- Country: United States

The Bill's Creek Shale is a geologic formation in Michigan. It preserves fossils dating back to the Ordovician period.
