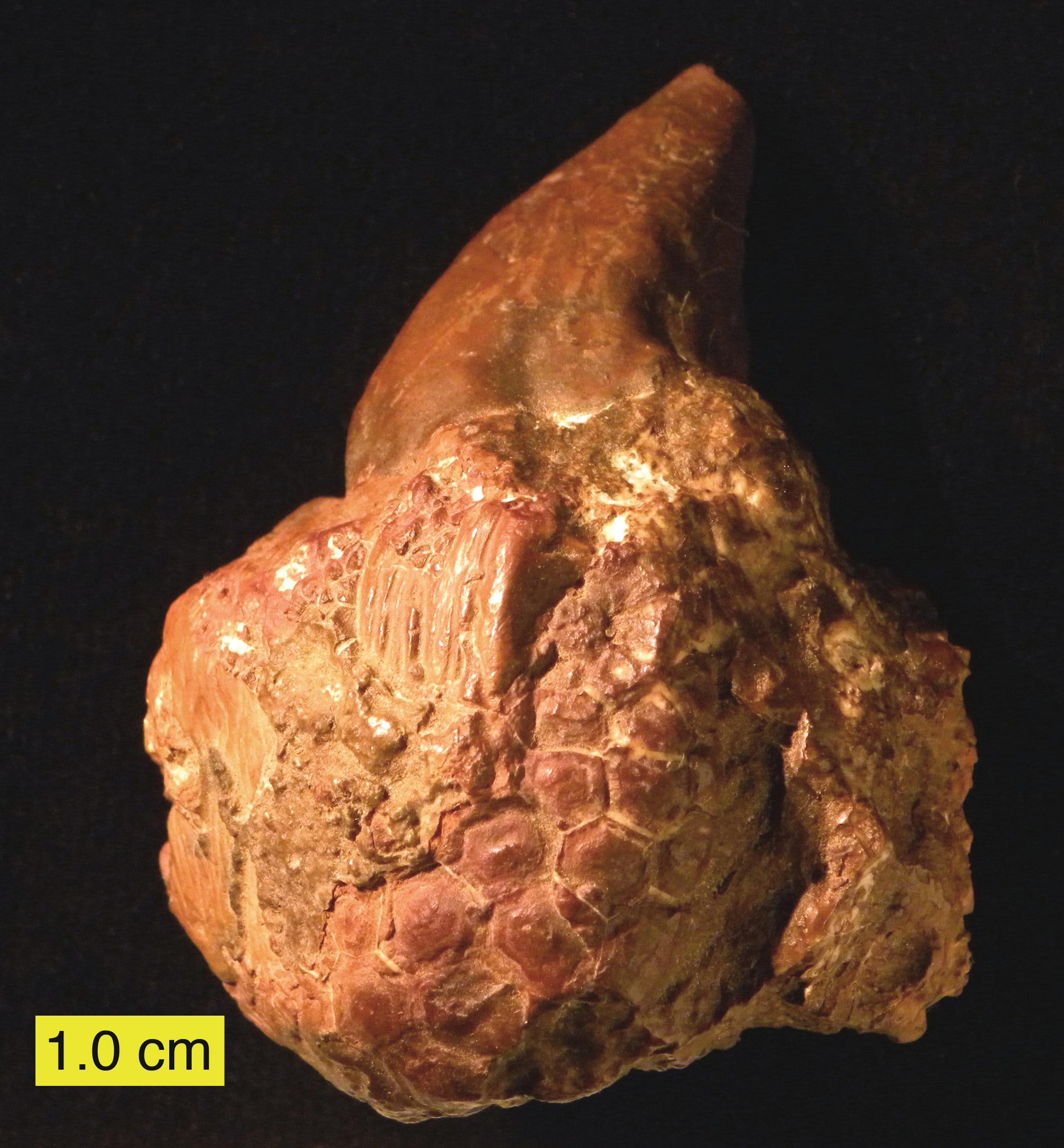
- Conical platyceratid gastropod (Palaeocapulus acutirostre) attached to a crinoid (Mississippian of Ohio)

Scientific classification
- Kingdom: Animalia
- Phylum: Mollusca
- Class: Gastropoda
- Subclass: Neritimorpha
- Order: incertae sedis
- Superfamily: †Platyceratoidea; Hall, 1879
- Family: †Platyceratidae; Hall, 1879

= Platyceratidae =

Platyceratidae Temporal range: Middle Ordovician–Permian

Extinct family of gastropods

Platyceratidae is an extinct family of Paleozoic sea snails, marine gastropod mollusks. This family may belong in the Patellogastropoda or the Neritimorpha.

Platyceratids are known for the complex symbiotic relationships they had with crinoids. Platyceratids are thought to have been parasitic on crinoids, either drilling into the stomach to steal the crinoid's food in a form of kleptoparasitism or drilling into the anal sac to feed on the gonads or the hindgut. Previous authors have suggested that platyceratids were commensalists which fed on crinoid fecal matter without harming the crinoid, but more recent studies have shown that platyceratids did have a negative effect on their crinoid hosts as would be expected if they were actively parasitic. It has been suggested that the large spines present on many species of crinoids served to deter predators who might damage or harm the crinoid in an effort to feed on the platyceratid snails infesting it.

This is the only family in the superfamily Platyceratoidea.

== Genera ==
- Platyceras Conrad, 1840 - type genus
- Palaeocapulus Grabau & Shimer, 1909
