= Prout Limestone =

Geologic formation In Ohio

- Stratigraphic range: Devonian
- Type: Formation
- Underlies: Ohio Shale
- Overlies: Plum Brook Shale

Location
- Region: Ohio
- Country: United States

The Prout Limestone is a geologic formation in Ohio, United States. It preserves fossils dating back to the Devonian period.

== See also ==
- List of fossiliferous stratigraphic units in Ohio
