= Thunder Bay Limestone =

Geological Formations

- Stratigraphic range: Middle Devonian (Givetian)
- Type: Geological formation
- Unit of: Traverse Group
- Sub-units: Partidge Point Member, Potter Farm Member, and Norway Point Member
- Underlies: Kettle Point Formation and Squaw Bay Limestone
- Overlies: Potter Farm Formation
- Thickness: 4.88 metres (16.0 ft)

Lithology
- Primary: limestone
- Other: shale

Location
- Region: Michigan
- Country: United States

Type section
- Named for: Thunder Bay (Michigan)

Thunder Bay Limestone is a geologic formation in Michigan that preserves fossils dating back to the Middle Devonian and is the uppermost formation of the Traverse Group.

== Description ==
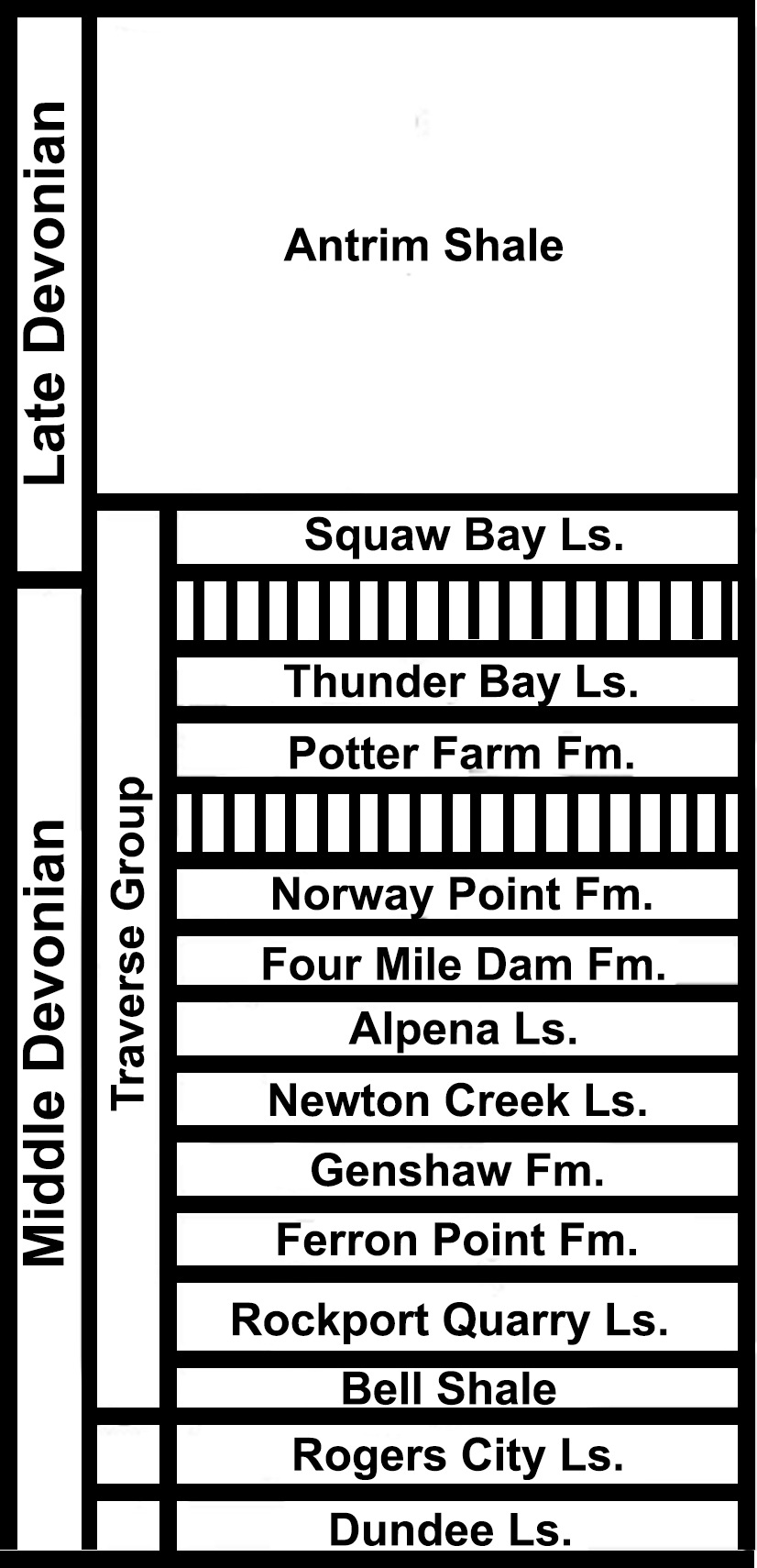
Stratigraphy of the Devonian deposits of the northern part of the Lower Peninsula of Michigan

The name for the formation originates from the description of strata near the "south cape of Thunder Bay" by C. C. Douglas in 1841, this area also represents the type locality of the formation. Due to negligence by multiple later workers, the area was later referred to as the Partridge Point Formation by Warthin & Cooper in 1935. It wasn't until 1943 that Warthin & Cooper would rename the formation back to its original name.

The type locality (Locality 30-8-11 SE) is the largest outcrop of the formation, exposing six units that have a total depth of about 4.8 meters. These units are largely made from light-colored limestones though the bottom-most unit has bluish limestone. The most unique unit would be unit 3 which mostly is made up of grey shales that grades into granular limestone at the surface.

The environment that the formation represents is a shallow carbonate platform with large amounts of coral and shelly fauna. Later formations show an increase in depth as water levels raised in the Eastern Interior seaway. Over time, the seaway would develop a stratified water column. Eventually, younger formations, like the Squaw Bay limestone, would show a deep basin environment.

== Paleobiota ==
=== Anthozoa ===
Genus	Species	Notes	Image
Antholites	A. alpenensis		
Aulacophyllum	A. hemicrassatum		
Alveolites	A. sp		
Bethanyphyllum	B. geniculatum		
Cylindrophyllum	C. grabaui		
Cystiphylloides	C. americanum elongatum		
Drymopora	D. sp.		
Favosites	F. mammillatus		
Favosites	F. placentus		
Favosites	F. romingeri		
Heterophrentis	H. sp.		
Hexagonaria	H. potterensis		
Platyaxum	P. sp.		
Stereohma	S?. sp. A.		
Syringopora	S. sp.		
Trachypora	T. alternans		
Trachypora	T. dendroidea		
Trachypora	T. perreticulata		
Trachypora	T. proboscidialis		
Trachypora	T?. reticulata		

=== Brachiopoda ===
Genus	Species	Notes	Image
Athyris	A. sp		
Atrypa	A. sp		
Camarotoechia	C. sp		
Chonetes	C. sp		
Cranaena	C. lincklaeni		
Cranaena	C. romingeri		
Cytina	C. hamiltonensis		
Cytina	C. sp		
Meristella	M. sp		
Mucrospirifer	M. sp		
Pentamerella	P. sp		
Orthospirifer	O. traversensis		

=== Bryozoa ===
Genus	Species	Notes	Image
Cyphotrypa	C?. unua		
Euspilipora	E. serrata		
Fenestrellina	F. compacta		
Fenestrellina	F. longispinosa		
Fenestrellina	F. nodicula		
Fenestrellina	F. variifenestrula		
Fistuliphragma	F. spinulifera		
Fistulipora	F. acervulosa		
Fistulipora	F. corrugata		
Fistulipora	F. stellifera		
Fistulipora	F. sulcata		
Hederella	H. cirrhosa		
Hederella	H. compacta		
Hederella	H. delicatula		
Hederella	H. persimilis		
Hederella	H. rugosa		
Lioclema	L. incompositum		
Lioclema	L. minutum		
Polypora	P. modesta		
Scalaripma	S. approximata		
Scalaripma	S. separata		
Semicoscinium	S. approximatum		
Sulcoretepora	S. hadmiltonensis		

=== Conodonta ===
Genus	Species	Notes	Image
Icriodus	I. cymbiformis		
Icriodus	I. expansus		
Icriodus	I. latericrescens latericrescens		
Polygnathus	P. varcus		

=== Echinodermata ===
Genus	Species	Notes	Image
Aorocrinus	A. cassedayi		
Atractocrinus	A. campanulatus		
Botryocrinus	B. thomasi		
Codaster	C. gracile		
Corocrinus	C. pettyesi		
Dactylocrinus	D. alpena		
Dolatocrinus	D. asterias		
Dolatocrinus	D. barrisi		
Dolatocrinus	D. triangulatus		
Euryocrinus	E. barrisi		
Gennaeocrinus	G. romingeri		
Lipsanocystis	L. traversensis		
Megistocrinus	M. concavus		
Megistocrinus	M. multidecoratus		
Megistocrinus	M. nodosus		
Megistocrinus	M. novus		
Megistocrinus	M. tuberatus		
Nucleocrinus	N. elegans ?		
Nucleocrinus	N. meloniformis		
Nucleocrinus	N. obovatus		
Pentremitidea	P. americana		
Pentremitidea	P. bassleri		
Pentremitidea	P. bassleri hastula		
Pentremitidea	P. milwaukeensis		
Stereocrinus	S. barrisi		
Stereocrinus	S. triangdatus		
Stereocrinus	S. triangdatus lirata		
Synbathocrinus	S. matutinus		
Synbathocrinus	S. sp. cf. S. michiganensis		

=== Mollusca ===
Genus	Species	Notes	Image
Cimitaria	C. recurva		
Cimitaria	C. sp		
Modiomorpha	M. mytiloides		
Mytilarca	M. cf. M. oviformis		
Plethomytilus	P. sp		

=== Placodermi ===
Genus	Species	Notes	Image
Ptyctodus	P. sp		

=== Stromatoporoidea ===
Genus	Species	Notes	Image
Stromatopora	S. sp.		

=== Tentaculita ===
Genus	Species	Notes	Image
Tentaculites	T. sp		

=== Trilobita ===
Genus	Species	Notes	Image
Dechenella	D. reimanni		
Dipleura	D. dekayi		
Greenops	G. alpenensis		
Phacops	P. iowensis		
Proetus	P. alpenensis		

== See also ==
- List of fossiliferous stratigraphic units in Michigan
