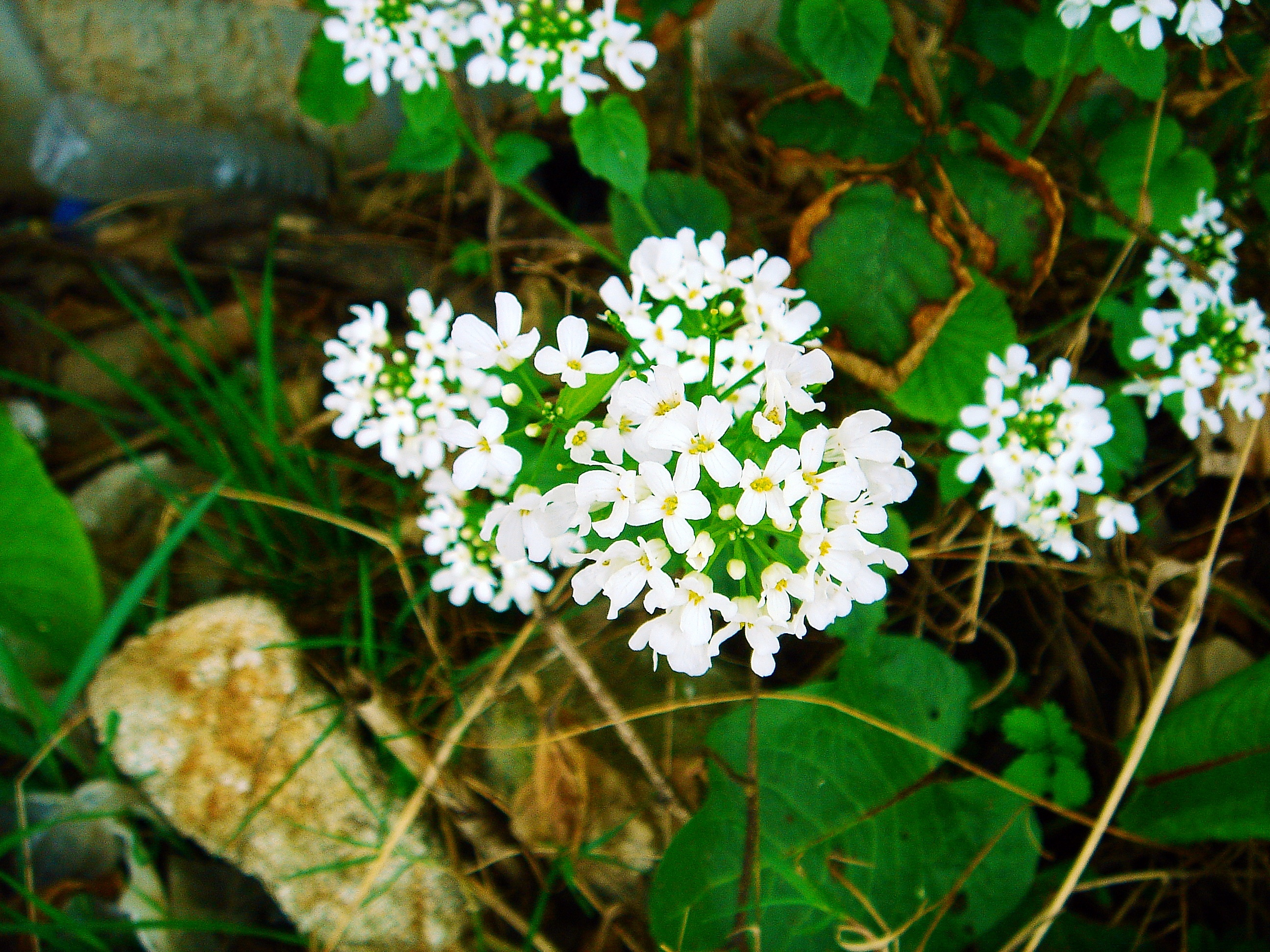
- Pachyphragma macrophyllum

Scientific classification
- Kingdom: Plantae
- Clade: Tracheophytes
- Clade: Angiosperms
- Clade: Eudicots
- Clade: Rosids
- Order: Brassicales
- Family: Brassicaceae
- Genus: Pachyphragma; Rchb.
- Species: P. macrophyllum

Binomial name
- Pachyphragma macrophyllum (Hoffm.) N.Busch

Synonyms
- Gagria M.Král; Pterolobium Andrz. ex C.A.Mey; Gagria lobata M.Král; Lepia latifolia (M.Bieb.) Desv.; Pterolobium biebersteinii Andrz. ex C.A.Mey.; Pterolobium macrophyllum Rupr.; Thlaspi latifolium M.Bieb.; Thlaspi macrophyllum Hoffm. (1808) (basionym)

= Pachyphragma =

Genus of plants

Pachyphragma is a genus of flowering plants belonging to the family Brassicaceae. It includes a single species, Pachyphragma macrophyllum, known as Caucasian Penny-cress. It is a perennial or rhizomatous geophyte native to eastern Turkey and the Caucasus.
