= Plum Brook Shale =

Geologic formation

- Stratigraphic range: Devonian
- Type: Formation
- Underlies: Prout Limestone
- Overlies: Delaware Limestone

Location
- Region: Ohio
- Country: United States

The Plum Brook Shale is a geologic formation in Ohio. It preserves fossils dating back to the Devonian period.

== See also ==
- List of fossiliferous stratigraphic units in Ohio
