= Rogers City Limestone =

Geologic formation in Michigan, United States

Rogers City Formation
- Stratigraphic range: Middle Devonian
- Type: Formation
- Underlies: Bell Shale
- Overlies: Dundee Formation

Location
- Region: Michigan
- Country: United States

The Rogers City Formation is a geologic formation in Michigan. It preserves fossils dating back to the Devonian period.
