= Bell Shale =

Geologic Formation dating back to the Devonian Period in Michigan

- Stratigraphic range: Middle Devonian
- Type: Formation
- Unit of: Traverse Group
- Underlies: Rockport Quarry Limestone
- Overlies: Rogers City Limestone

Location
- Region: Michigan
- Country: United States

The Bell Shale is a geologic formation in Michigan. It preserves fossils dating back to the Devonian period.
