= Ferron Point Formation =

Geologic formation in Michigan

- Stratigraphic range: Middle Devonian
- Type: Formation
- Unit of: Traverse Group
- Underlies: Long Lake Limestone
- Overlies: Rockport Quarry Limestone

Location
- Region: Michigan
- Country: United States

The Ferron Point Formation is a geologic formation in Michigan. It preserves fossils dating back to the Devonian period.
