= Antrim Shale =

Geological formation in Midwestern United States

- Stratigraphic range: Late Devonian
- Antrim Shale outcrop and productive gas area, from Ryder (1996) US Geological Survey.
- Type: Formation
- Sub-units: Upper Member, Lachine Member, Paxton Member, and Norwood Member
- Underlies: Bedford Shale, Ellsworth Shale, and Sunbury Shale
- Overlies: Squaw Bay Limestone, Traverse Formation and Milwaukee Formation

Location
- Region: Midwestern United States
- Country: United States
- Extent: Indiana, Michigan, Ohio, and Wisconsin

Type section
- Named for: Antrim County, Michigan

The Antrim Shale is a formation of Upper Devonian age in the Michigan Basin, in the US state of Michigan, and extending into Ohio, Indiana and Wisconsin. It is a major source of natural gas in the northern part of the basin.

The Antrim Shale was defined by A. C. Lane in 1901, and named for type-section exposures in Antrim County, Michigan. The formation was previously known as the St. Cleric Shale in Michigan, and the Genesee Shale in Indiana.

== Stratigraphy ==
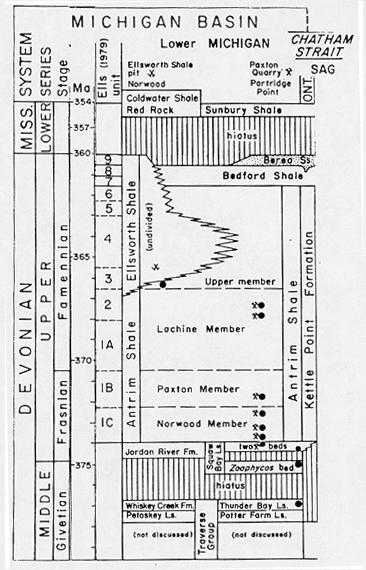
Stratigraphic relationships of the Antrim Shale, from Ryder (1996) US Geological Survey.

The Antrim is a brown to black, pyritic, highly laminated and organic-rich shale, from 60 to 220 feet thick. Total organic content varies from 1% to 20%. In some places the unit includes a gray calcareous shale or limestone, and in places a fine-grained sandstone at the base.

The formation is called the Kettle Point Formation in Ontario, and is the stratigraphic equivalent of the New Albany Shale in the Illinois Basin. It is overlain by the Bedford Shale, and underlain in some areas by the Jordan River Formation, and elsewhere by the Thunder Bay Limestone.

== Natural gas ==
The Antrim Shale, is a major source of shale gas, and produces natural gas along a swath across the northern part of the state. Most natural gas production is in Antrim, Crawford, Montmorency, Oscoda and Otsego counties.

Although the Antrim Shale has produced gas since the 1940s, the play was not active until the late 1980s. During the 1990s, the Antrim became the most actively drilled shale gas play in the US, with thousands of wells drilled. To date, the shale has produced more than 2.5 TCF from more than 9 thousand wells. Antrim Shale wells produced almost 140×10^{9} cu ft (4.0×10^{9} m^{3}) in 2006.

The shale appears to be most economic at depths of 600–2,200 feet. Original gas content ranges from 40 to 100 standard cubic feet per ton. Wells are developed on units of from 40-acre (160,000 m^{2}) to 160-acre (650,000 m^{2}). Horizontal drilling is not widely used. Antrim Shale wells often have to pump much initial water before gas production becomes significant, a behavior also seen in many coalbed methane wells.

Unlike most other shale gas plays, the natural gas from the Antrim appears to be biogenic gas generated by the action of bacteria on the organic-rich rock. Also unlike most other shale plays, the Antrim Shale is thermally immature in the gas-productive trend.

In 2007, the Antrim gas field produced 136 billion cubic feet of gas, making it the 13th-largest source of natural gas in the United States.

== See also ==
- Shale gas in the United States
