= Alpena Limestone =

Geologic formation in Michigan

Alpena Formation
- Stratigraphic range: Middle Devonian
- Type: Formation
- Unit of: Traverse Group
- Sub-units: Four Mile Dam Member and Newton Creek Member
- Underlies: Thunder Bay Limestone
- Overlies: Long Lake Limestone

Location
- Region: Michigan
- Country: United States

The Alpena Formation is a geologic formation in Michigan. It preserves fossils dating back to the Devonian period.
