= Traverse Group =

- Stratigraphic range: Devonian
- Type: Group
- Sub-units: Bell Shale, Rockport Quarry Limestone, Ferron Point Fm, Koehler Limestone, Gravel Point Fm, Charlevoix Limestone, Petoskey Fm, Whiskey Creek Fm, Ten Mile Creek Dolomite
- Underlies: Antrim Shale and Jordan River Formation
- Overlies: Dundee Formation and Rogers City Limestone
- Thickness: 183 meters

Lithology
- Other: Limestone

Location
- Region: Indiana, Michigan, Ohio
- Country: United States

The Traverse Group is a geologic group in Michigan, Indiana and Ohio comprising middle Devonian limestones with calcareous shale components. Its marine fossils notably include Michigan's state stone, the Petoskey stone (the extinct coral Hexagonaria percarinata), among other corals and records of ancient marine life. A range of trilobites has also been found in the Traverse Group.

The Traverse Group outcrops in Emmet and Charlevoix counties along the northwestern shore of Michigan's lower peninsula. Its formations are Gravel Point, Charlevoix Limestone, Petoskey, and Whiskey Creek. The Gravel Point Formation consists of a lithographic gray to brown limestone with shale beds up to 0.5 meters thick; it also includes chert nodules and bioherms (fossilized reef mounds). The Charlevoix Limestone is a mildly argillaceous limestone with interbedded coquina. The Petoskey Formation is an arenaceous limestone named for its locale (Petoskey, Michigan), and contains the eponymous Petoskey stones. The Whiskey Creek Formation is a limestone.

The Traverse Group formed as a shallow carbonate shelf during the Devonian period (~419 to 359 Ma), when the most recent supercontinent, Pangea, was just beginning to take shape.

== See also ==
- List of fossiliferous stratigraphic units in Michigan
