= Potter Farm Formation =

Geologic formation in Michigan, United States

- Stratigraphic range: Devonian
- Type: Formation

Location
- Region: Michigan
- Country: United States

The Potter Farm Formation is a geologic formation in Michigan. It preserves fossils dating back to the Devonian period.
