= List of fossiliferous stratigraphic units in Manitoba =

This is a list of fossiliferous stratigraphic units in Manitoba, Canada.

Group or formation	Period	Notes
Bad Cache Rapids Group/Portage Chute Formation	Ordovician	
Bad Cache Rapids Group/Surprise Creek Formation	Ordovician	
Chasm Creek Formation	Ordovician	
Churchill River Formation	Ordovician	
Churchill River Group/Caution Creek Formation	Ordovician	
Churchill River Group/Chasm Creek Formation	Ordovician	
Churchill River Group/Red Head Rapids Formation	Ordovician	
Colorado Group/Niobrara Formation	Cretaceous	
Dawson Bay Formation	Devonian	
Elm Point Formation	Devonian	
Favel Formation	Cretaceous	
Interlake Group/Atikameg Dolomite	Silurian	
Interlake Group/Cedar Lake Dolomite	Silurian	
Interlake Group/Cross Lake Dolomite	Silurian	
Interlake Group/East Arm Dolomite	Silurian	
Interlake Group/Fisher Branch Dolomite	Silurian	
Interlake Group/Inwood Formation	Silurian	
Interlake Group/Moose Lake Dolomite	Silurian	
Manitoba Limestone Formation	Devonian	
Montana Group/Pierre Shale Formation	Cretaceous	
Pierre Formation	Cretaceous	
Pierre Shale Formation	Cretaceous	
Portage Chute Formation	Ordovician	
Red River Formation	Ordovician	
Souris River Formation	Devonian	
Stonewall Formation	Ordovician	
Stony Mountain Formation	Ordovician	
Vermilion River Formation	Cretaceous	
Winnipegosis Formation	Devonian	
