= Herald Formation =

Geologic formation in Saskatchewan

- Stratigraphic range: Late Ordovician
- Type: Geological formation
- Sub-units: Lake Alma Member; Coronach Member; Redvers Unit
- Underlies: Stony Mountain Formation
- Overlies: Yeoman Formation
- Thickness: up to 38 metres (120 ft)

Lithology
- Primary: limestone, dolomite, anhydrite

Location
- Coordinates: 49.0746°N 104.6521°W
- Region: WCSB
- Country: Canada

Type section
- Named by: Saskatchewan Geological Society, 1958.

The Herald Formation is a stratigraphic unit of Late Ordovician age in the Western Canadian Sedimentary Basin.

It was defined in well Imperial Herald 1-31-1-20W2M by the Lower Paleozoic Names and Correlations Committee of the Saskatchewan Geological Society in 1958.

== Lithology ==
The Herald Formation is composed of dolomitic limestone and dolomite, which can be microcrystalline, argillaceous or microlaminated. In the centre of the basin, it is represented by anhydrite.

== Distribution ==
The Herald Formation reaches a maximum thickness of 38 metres (120 ft) in the Lake Alma area.

== Relationship to other units ==
The Herald Formation is disconformably overlain by the Stony Mountain Formation and conformably overlays the Yeoman Formation.

It can be correlated with the Fort Garry Member of the Red River Formation in Manitoba and in the Williston Basin.

== Subdivisions ==
In south-eastern Saskatchewan, the formation is divided in three units, corresponding to three sedimentation cycles:

- Lake Alma Member
- Coronach Member
- Redvers Unit
