= East Arm =

East Arm may also refer to:

- East Arm, Antarctica, a geological feature on the Antarctica.
- East Arm, Northern Territory, a suburb in Australia
- East Arm Dolomite, a geological formation in Canada

== See also ==
- East Arm Little Calumet River
- East Bay (disambiguation)
