= Inwood Formation =

The Inwood Formation may refer to:

- Inwood Formation (Manitoba), which preserves fossils dating back to the Silurian period
- Inwood Formation (New York), from which comes marble variously called Inwood, Westchester or Tuckahoe marble
