= Elm Point Formation =

Geologic formation in Manitoba, Canada

- Stratigraphic range: Devonian
- Type: Formation

Location
- Region: Manitoba
- Country: Canada

The Elm Point Formation is a geologic formation in Manitoba. It preserves fossils dating back to the Devonian period.

== See also ==
- List of fossiliferous stratigraphic units in Manitoba
