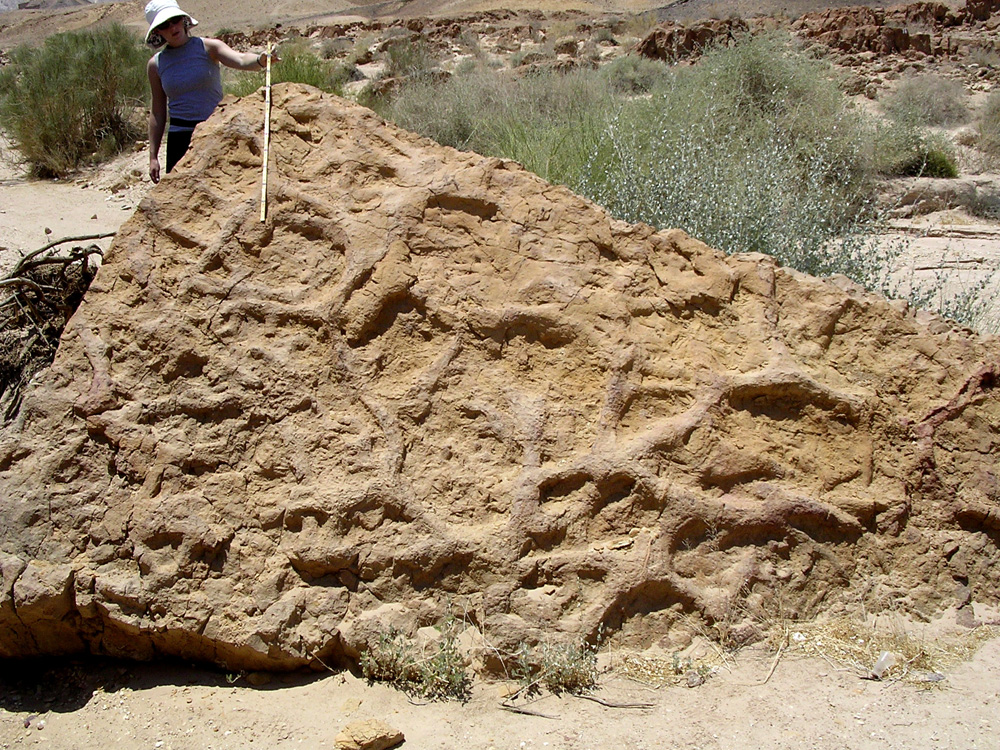
- Thalassinoides, burrows produced by thalassinideans, from the Middle Jurassic, Makhtesh Qatan, southern Israel

Trace fossil classification
- Ichnogenus: Thalassinoides; Ehrenberg, 1944

= Thalassinoides =

Trace fossil

Thalassinoides is an ichnogenus of trace fossil (fossil records of lifeforms' movement, rather than of the lifeforms themselves) used to refer to "dichotomously or T-branched boxworks, mazes and shafts, unlined and unornamented". Facies of Thalassinoides increased suddenly in abundance at the beginning of the Mesozoic. Such burrows are made by a number of organisms, including the sea anemone Cerianthus, Balanoglossus and fishes, but are most closely associated with decapod crustaceans of the (former) infraorder Thalassinidea.

== Gallery ==
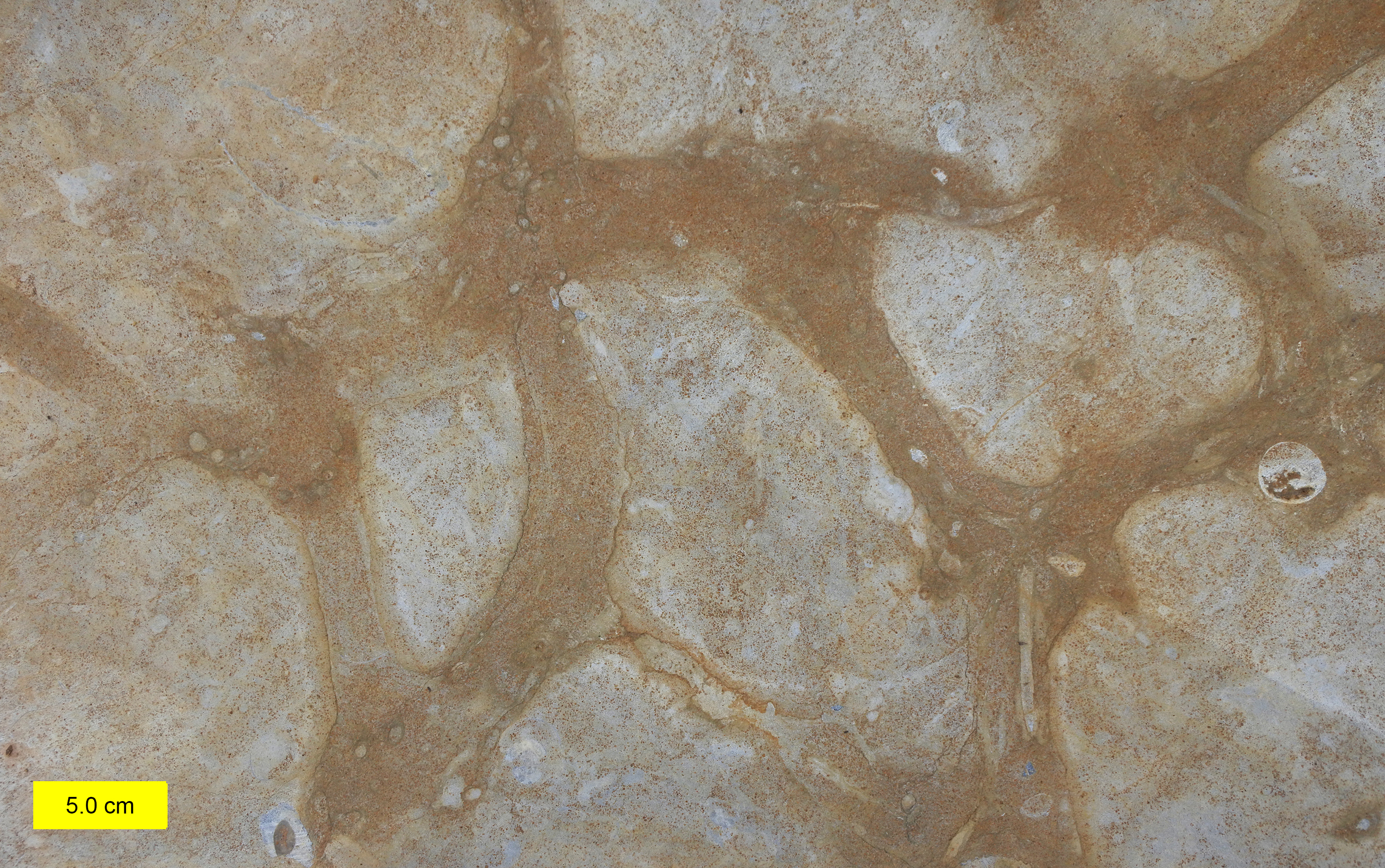
Thalassinoides burrow system in the Sherborne Building Stone (Jurassic, Bajocian) of Dorset, England; slab cut parallel to bedding.

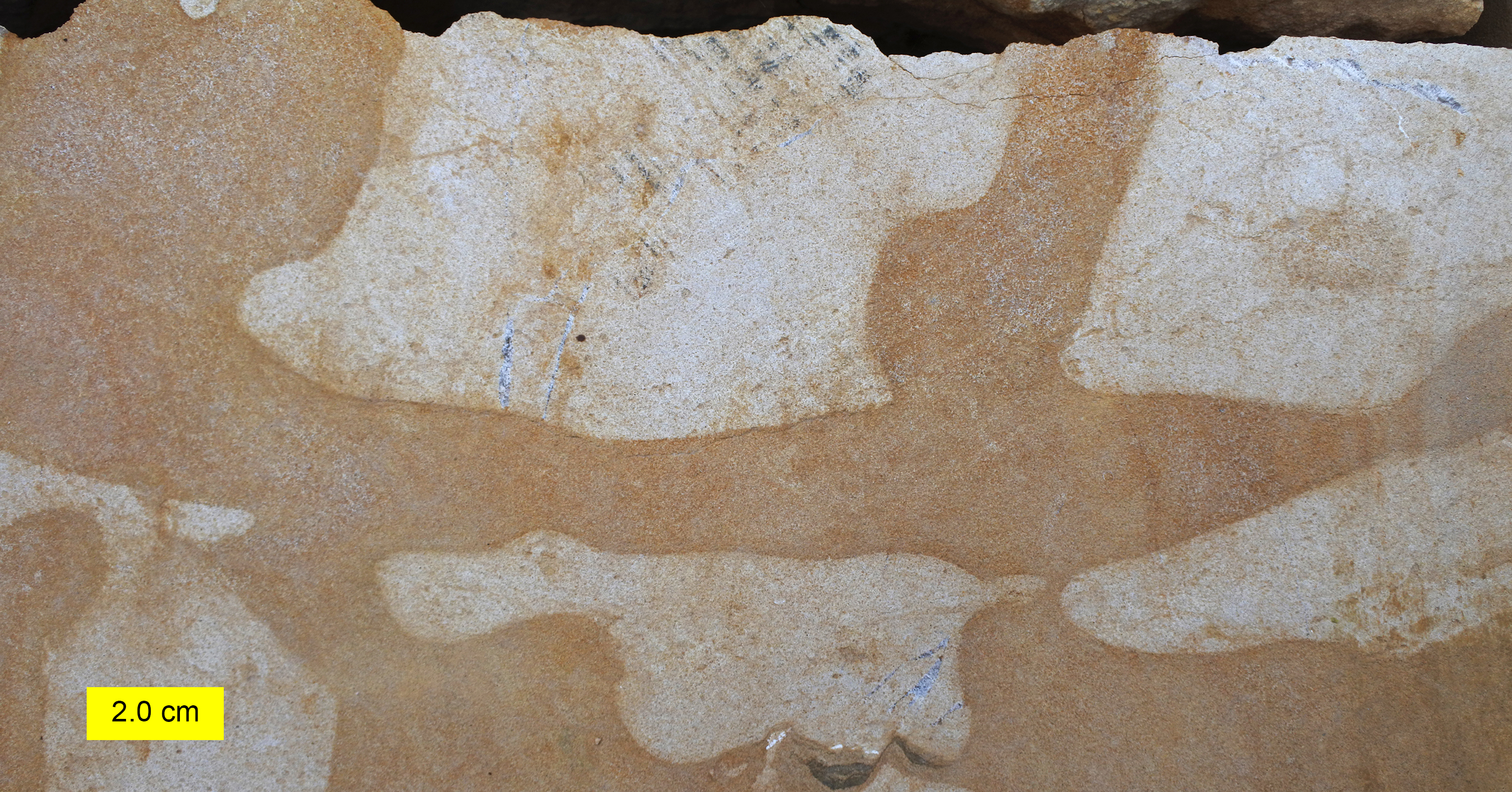
Thalassinoides burrow system in the Sherborne Building Stone (Jurassic, Bajocian) of Dorset, England; slab cut perpendicular to bedding.

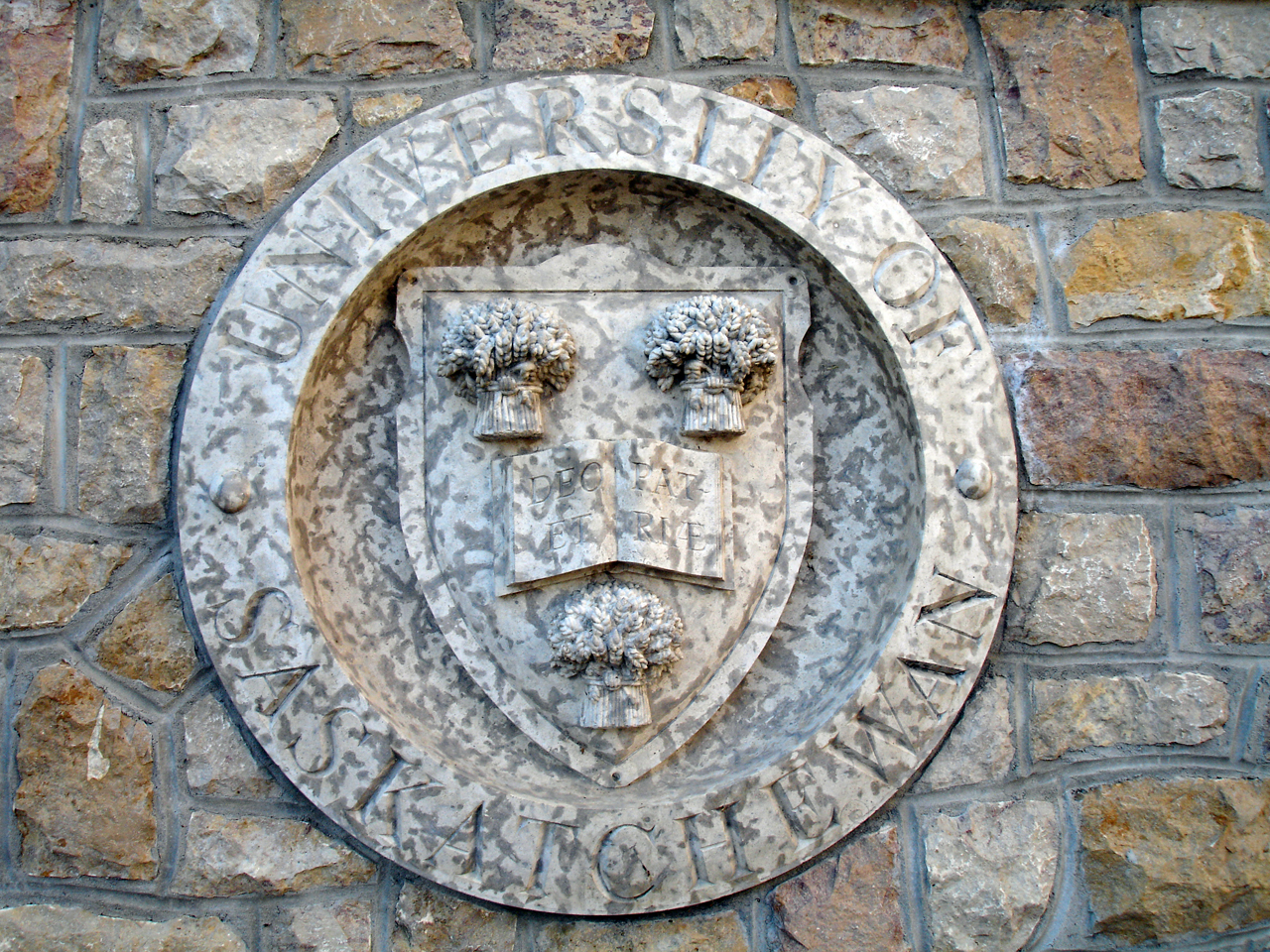
Thalassinoides burrows give a unique texture to this crest carved from Ordovician Tyndall limestone.

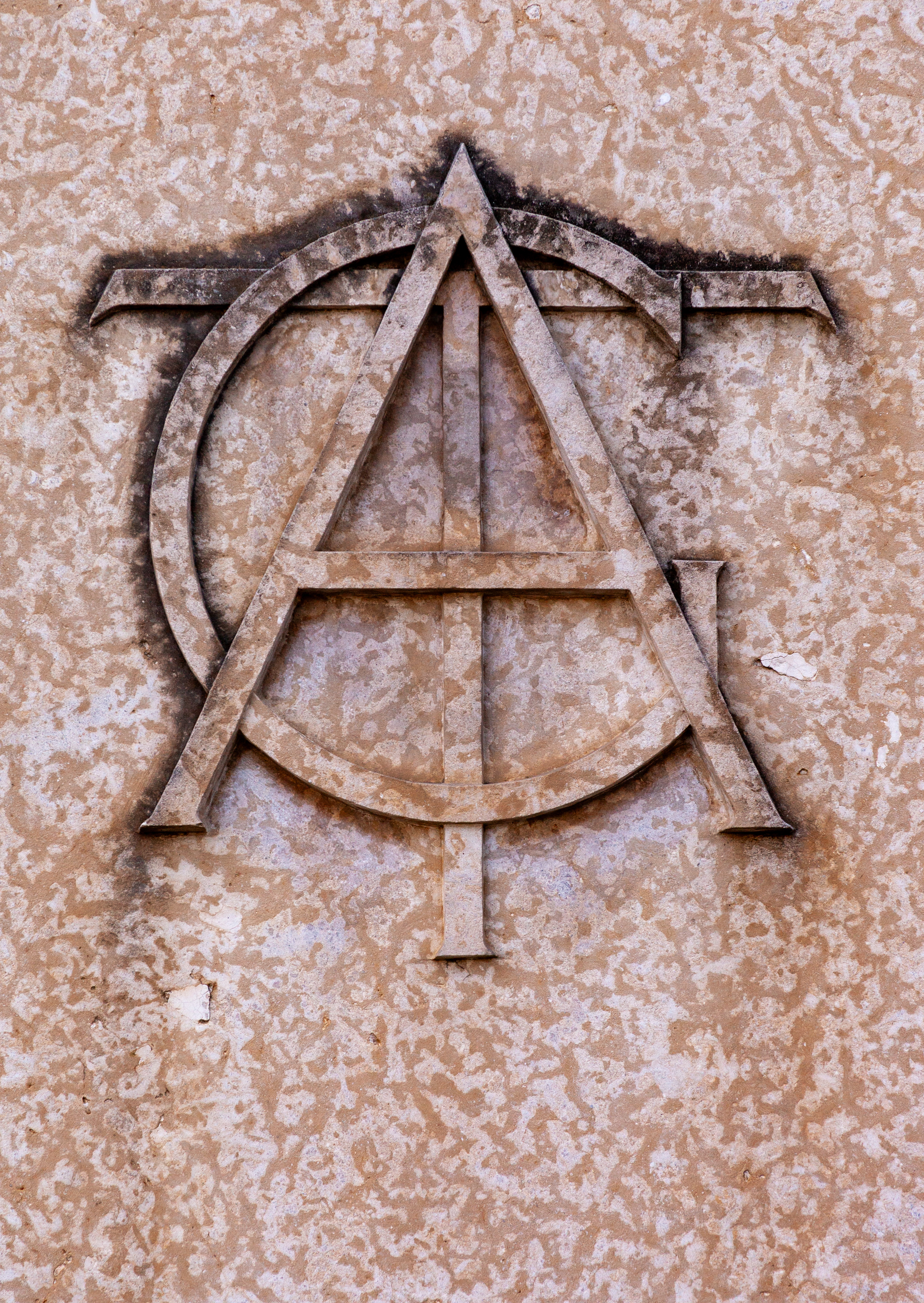
A closer view of Thalassinoides burrows in Tyndall limestone.
