= Cross Lake Dolomite =

Geologic formation in Manitoba, Canada

- Stratigraphic range: Silurian
- Type: Formation

Location
- Region: Manitoba
- Country: Canada

The Cross Lake Dolomite is a geologic formation in Manitoba. It preserves fossils dating back to the Silurian period.

== See also ==
- List of fossiliferous stratigraphic units in Manitoba
