= Churchill River Group =

Geologic group in Manitoba, Canada

- Stratigraphic range: Ordovician
- Type: Group

Location
- Region: Manitoba
- Country: Canada

The Churchill River Group is a geologic group in Manitoba. It preserves fossils dating back to the Ordovician period.

== See also ==
- List of fossiliferous stratigraphic units in Manitoba
