= Inwood Formation, Manitoba =

Geologic formation in Manitoba, Canada

Inwood Formation
- Stratigraphic range: Telychian; ~436–433 Ma
- Type: Formation
- Unit of: Interlake Group

Lithology
- Primary: Dolomite
- Other: Halite, siltstone

Location
- Coordinates: 53.2°N 99.3°W
- Approximate paleocoordinates: 10.0°S 51.4°W
- Region: Manitoba
- Country: Canada
- Inwood Formation, Manitoba (Canada) Inwood Formation, Manitoba (Manitoba)

The Inwood Formation is a geologic formation in Manitoba. The silty and salty dolomites preserve fossils dating back to the Telychian stage of the Silurian period.

== Fossil content ==
The following fossils have been reported from the formation:

=== Trilobites ===
- ?Encrinurus tuberculifrons

=== Ostracods ===
- Leperditia hisingeri

=== Strophomenata ===
- Brachyprion cf. inflata
- Fardenia ellipsoides
- F. transversalis
- Fardenia cf. elegans

=== Rhynchonellata ===
- Camarotoechia indianensis
- Hyattidina junea

=== Gastropods ===
- Coelocaulus sp.
- Gastropoda indet.

=== Cephalopods ===
- Lowoceras imbricatum
- Mandaloceras parvulum

=== Stromatoporoidea ===
- Clathrodictyon drummondense
- Clathrodictyon cf. striatellum

=== Corals ===
- Amplexoides severnensis
- Asthenophyllum inwoodense
- Favosites cf. niagarensis
- Halysites catenularia
- Neozaphrentis tyrrelli
- Paleofavosites poulseni
- P. transiens

== See also ==
- List of fossiliferous stratigraphic units in Manitoba
