= Tyndall stone =

Trademark of limestone from Canada

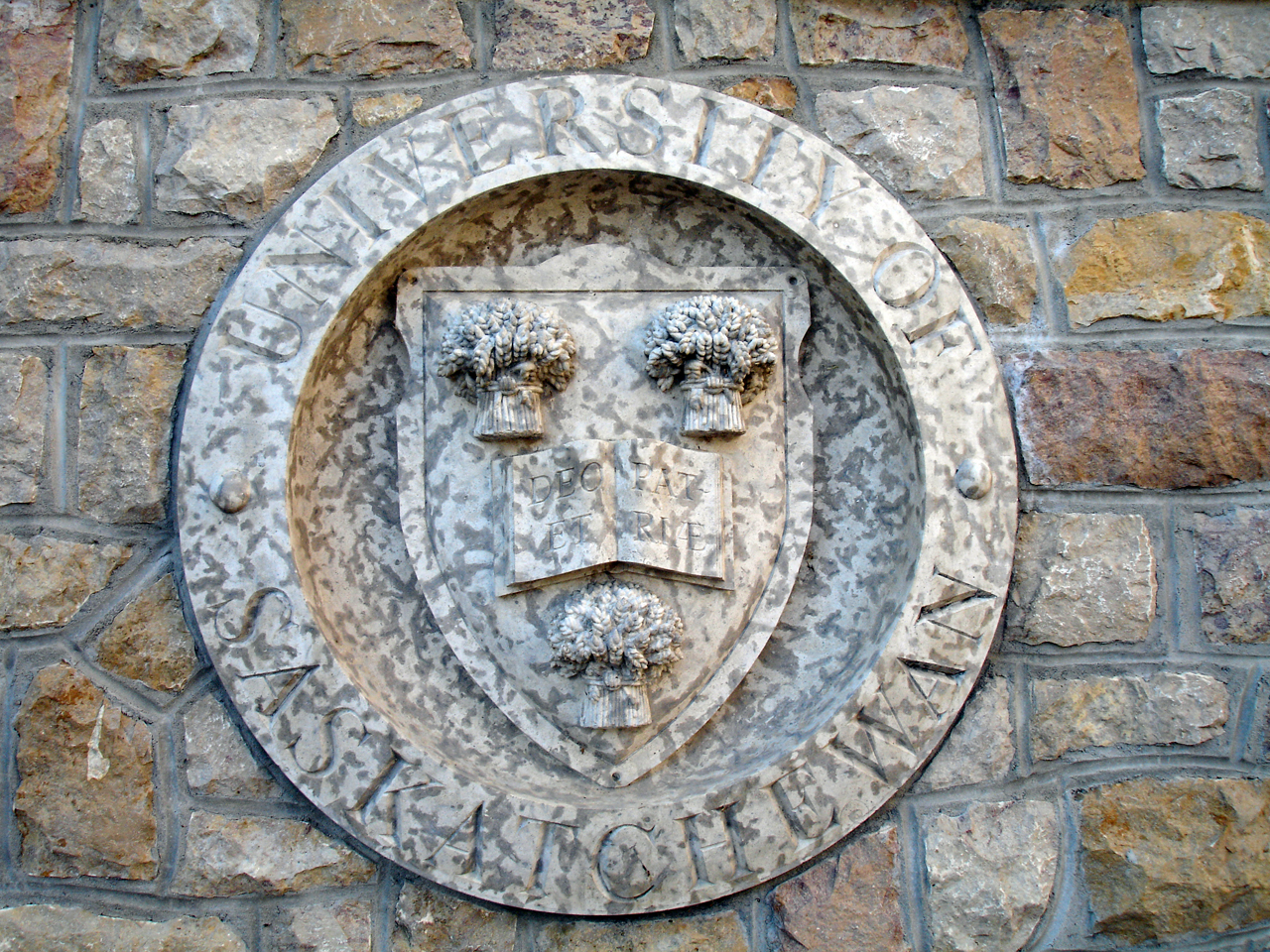
This carved Tyndall Stone coat of arms on the University of Saskatchewan campus shows the stone's characteristic mottling.

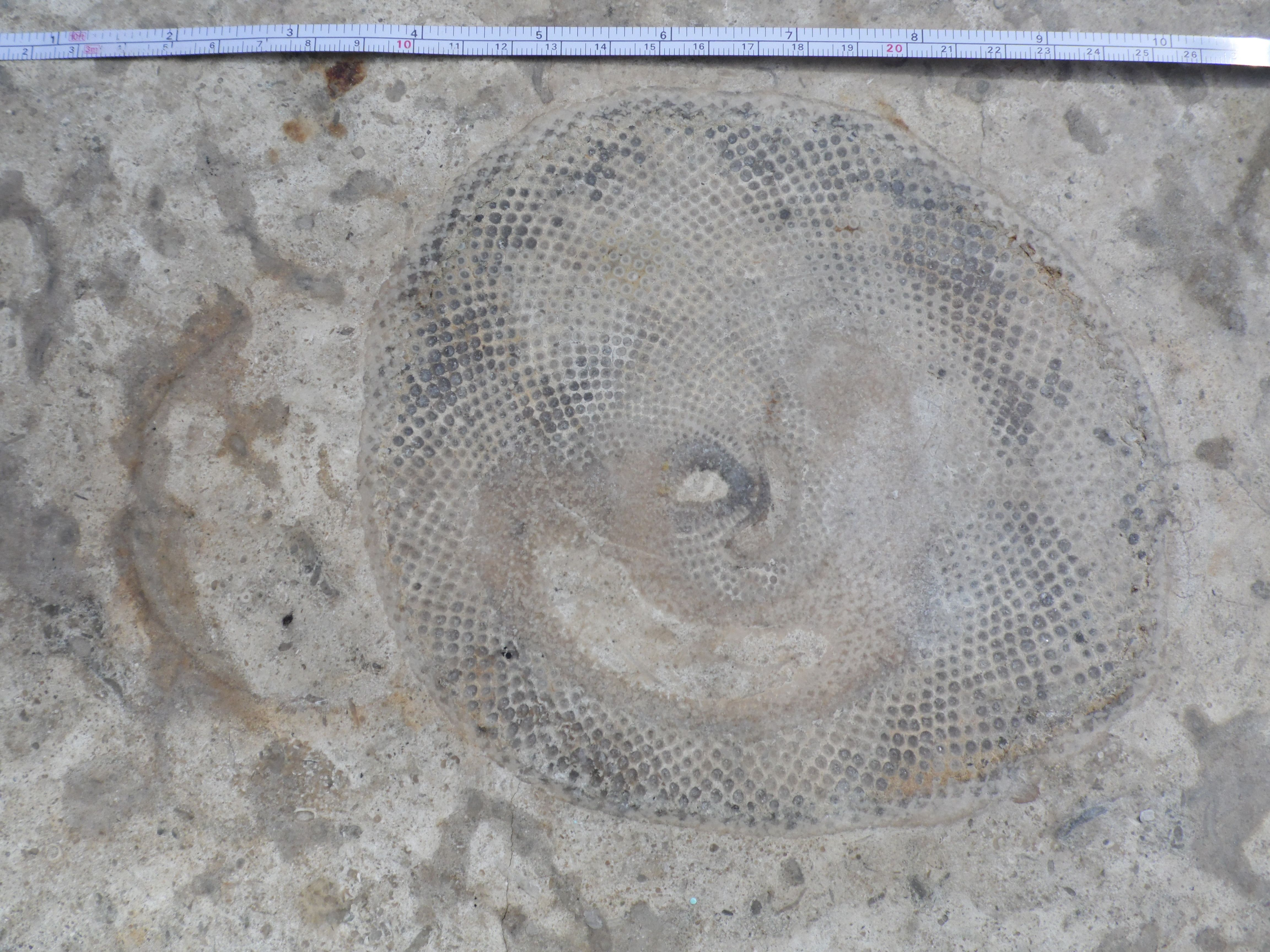
Fossil Receptaculites and Thalassinoides in Tyndall Stone.

Tyndall Stone is a registered trademark name by Gillis Quarries Ltd. Tyndall Stone is a dolomitic limestone that is quarried from the Selkirk Member of the Ordovician Red River Formation in the vicinity of Garson and Tyndall, Manitoba, Canada. It is a cream-coloured limestone with a pervasive mottling of darker dolomite. The mottling gives the rock a tapestry-like effect, and it is popular for use as a building and ornamental stone.

Tyndall Stone is highly fossiliferous and the fossils contribute to its aesthetic appeal. It contains numerous fossil gastropods, brachiopods, cephalopods, trilobites, corals, stromatoporoids, Receptaculites, and others. The mottling results from burrowing by marine creatures that occurred during and shortly after limestone deposition. The identity of the burrowing organisms is not known, but fossil burrows of this type have been given the name Thalassinoides.

Tyndall Stone was first used in 1832 for building Lower Fort Garry, and has since become popular for building purposes throughout Canada and the United States. The Canadian Parliament Buildings in Ottawa, Ontario, the Saskatchewan Legislative Building in Regina, Saskatchewan, the University of Saskatchewan in Saskatoon, Saskatchewan, the Queen Elizabeth II Building in Edmonton, Alberta, the Canadian Museum of History in Gatineau, Quebec, the Manitoba Legislative Building in Winnipeg, Manitoba, the Banff Springs Hotel, the Empress Hotel in Victoria, British Columbia, the Appartements le Château in Montreal, Quebec and many others include Tyndall Stone in their construction.

The Tyndall Stone quarry is operated by Gillis Quarries Ltd. and is located approximately 40 kilometres northeast of Winnipeg, Manitoba. The quarry has been in operation, and owned by the same family, since 1910.

In 2023, Tyndall Stone was designated as a Global Heritage Stone Resource, the only one of Canadian origin.

== Cultural reference ==
Author Carol Shields described Tyndall Stone in her Pulitzer Prize winning novel, The Stone Diaries.
