= Stony Mountain Formation =

Stratigraphical unit of Ashgill age

- Stratigraphic range: Ashgill
- Type: Geological formation
- Underlies: Stonewall Formation
- Overlies: Red River Formation
- Thickness: up to 45 metres (150 ft)

Lithology
- Primary: Dolomite, shale
- Other: Anhydrite, limestone

Location
- Coordinates: 49.9184°N 97.5265°W
- Region: WCSB; Williston Basin
- Country: Canada; United States

Type section
- Named for: Stony Mountain, Manitoba
- Named by: D.B. Dowling, 1900

The Stony Mountain Formation is a stratigraphic unit of Ashgill age in the Western Canadian Sedimentary Basin.

It takes the name from the community Stony Mountain, Manitoba, and was first described in the town quarry by D.B. Dowling in 1900.

== Lithology ==
=== Subdivisions ===
The Stony Mountain Formation is divided into the following sub-units:

South (Williston Basin)

- Penitentiary Member: argillaceous dolomite
- Gunn Member: interbedded calcareous shale and fossiliferous limestone

North

- Gunton Member: crystalline dolomite
- Lower Stony Mountain: argillaceous dolomite

== Distribution ==
The Stony Mountain Formation occurs throughout the Williston Basin. It reaches a maximum thickness of 45 metres (150 ft) in the sub-surface at the Canada/United States border, and thins out towards the east, north and west. In Manitoba, where it is exposed at the surface in the erosion belt, it has a thickness of 30 metres (100 ft).

== Relationship to other units ==
The Stony Mountain Formation is slightly unconformably overlain by the Stonewall Formation and sharply overlays the Red River Formation or the Herald Formation.
