= Williston Basin =

Sedimentary basin in Montana, United States

Coordinates: 49°N 104°W

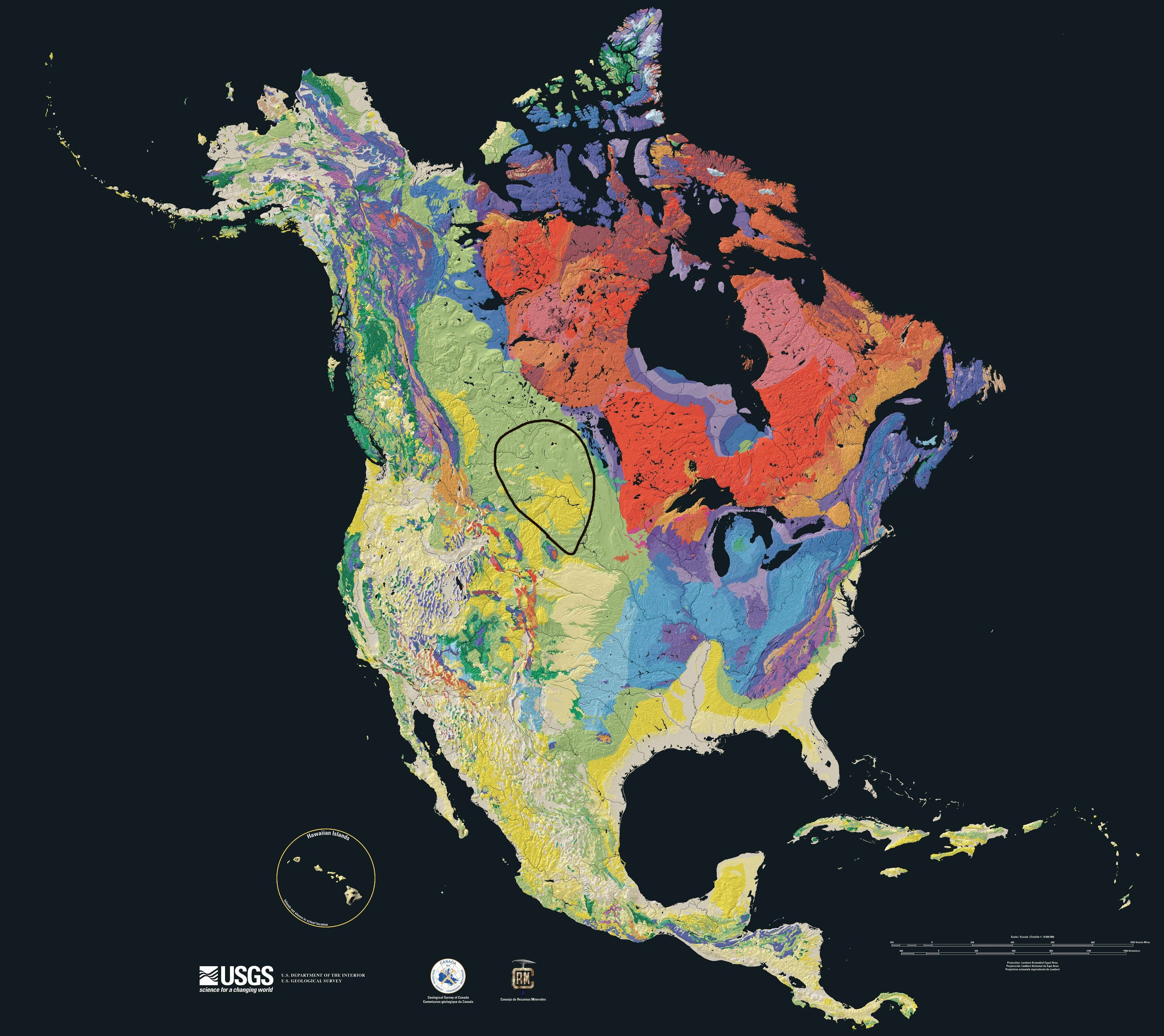
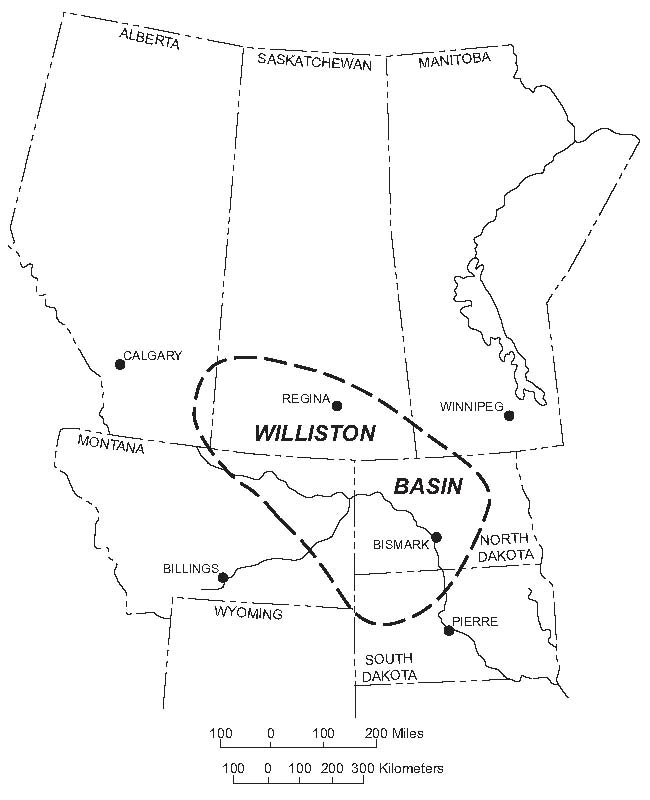
Location of Williston Basin
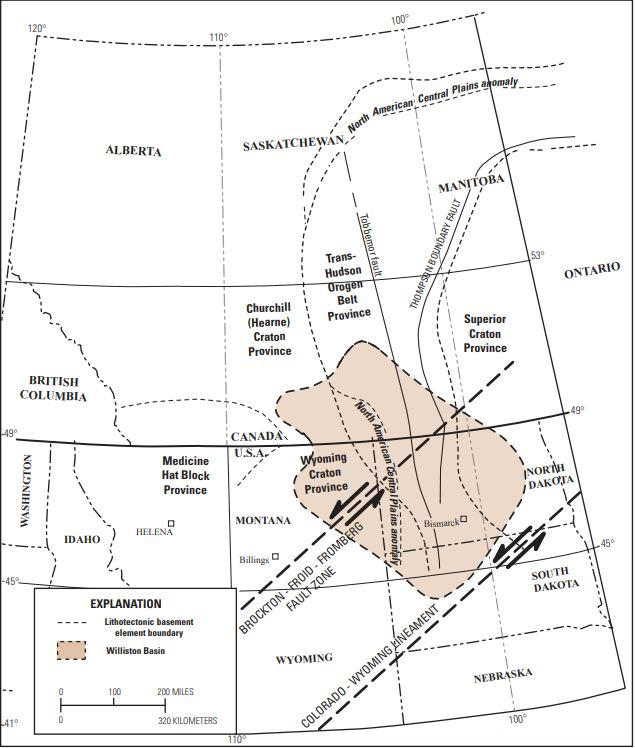
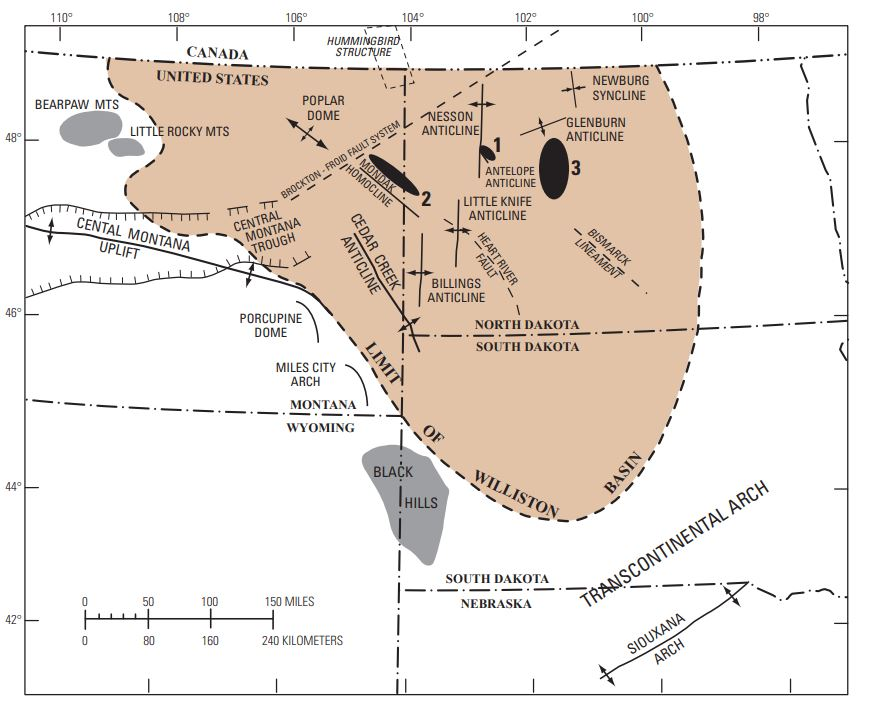
Tectonic and structure geological maps

The Williston Basin is a large intracratonic sedimentary basin in eastern Montana, western North Dakota, South Dakota, southern Saskatchewan, and south-western Manitoba that is known for its rich deposits of petroleum and potash. The basin is a geologic structural basin but not a topographic depression; it is transected by the Missouri River. The oval-shaped depression extends approximately 475 miles (764 km) north-south and 300 miles (480 km) east-west.

The Williston Basin lies above an ancient Precambrian geologic basement feature, the Trans-Hudson Orogenic Belt that developed in this area about 1.8-1.9 billion years ago, and that created a weak zone that later led to sagging to produce the basin. The Precambrian basement rocks in the center of the basin beneath the city of Williston, North Dakota lie about 16,000 feet (4,900 m) below the surface.

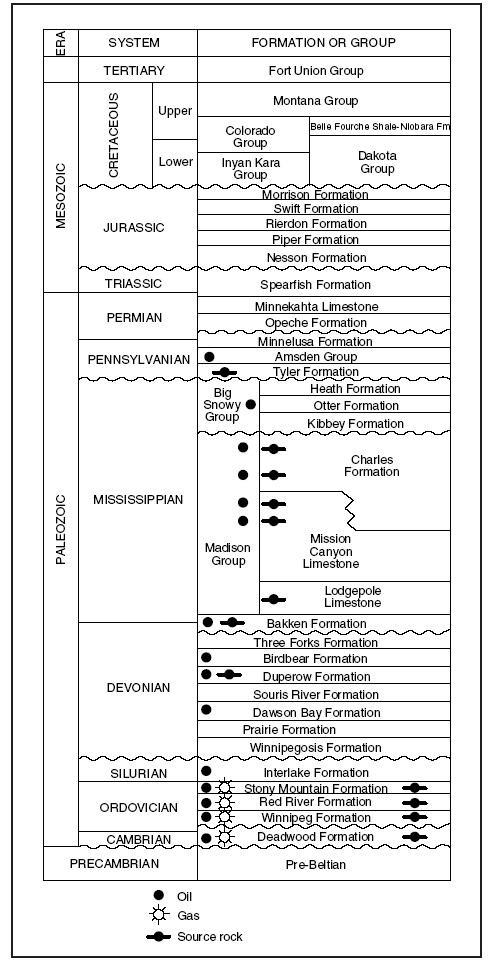
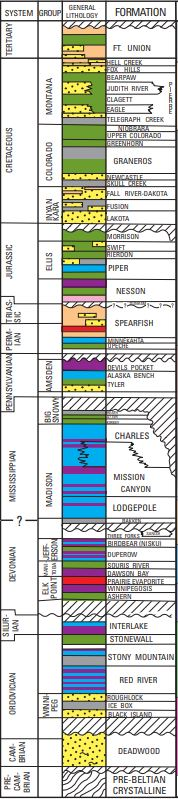
Stratigraphic column showing 12 hydrocarbon source beds and 15 reservoir rocks in the Williston Basin

Deposition of sediments began in the Williston area during Cambrian time, but subsidence and basin filling were most intense during the Ordovician, Silurian, and Devonian Periods, when thick accumulations of limestone and dolomite, with lesser thicknesses of sandstones, siltstones, shales, and evaporites were laid down. Subsidence continued on a reduced scale into the Mississippian and was largely ended by Pennsylvanian time. Regional subsidence returned during the Mesozoic Era, although total sediment thicknesses were much less than during the Paleozoic. Near the end of the Cretaceous, tectonic activity during the Laramide Orogeny rejuvenated several basement structures in the Williston Basin to produce anticlines that serve as oil traps today.

== Natural resources ==
=== Petroleum ===
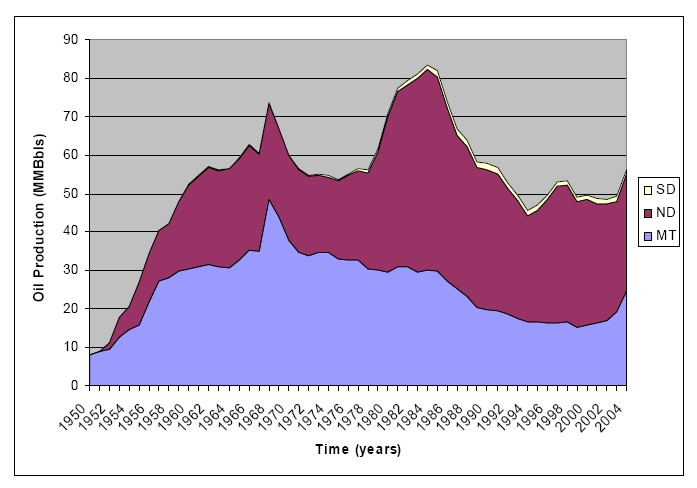
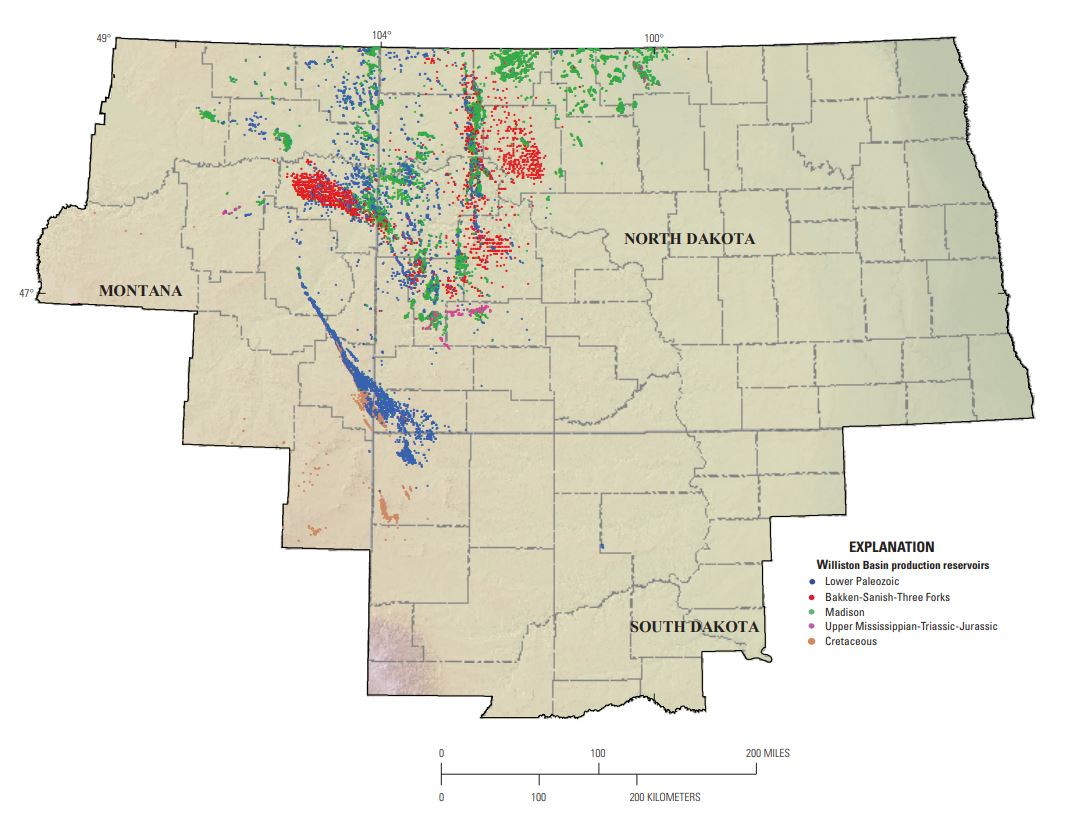
Annual oil production in the US part of the Williston Basin (ND=North Dakota, SD=South Dakota, MT=Montana)

The long history of sedimentary deposition in the Williston Basin included deposition of rocks well suited to serve as hydrocarbon source and reservoir rocks. The basin's oil and gas fields are found in a wide range of geologic ages, as indicated by the generalized stratigraphic column.

In 1913, shallow gas was discovered in an Upper Cretaceous sandstone on the Cedar Creek Anticline, and oil was discovered on the same anticline in 1936. The basin did not become a major oil province until the 1950s when large fields were discovered in North Dakota. Amerada Corporation began the search in 1946. After four years of testing and mapping they started drilling at a promising lease 30 miles north-east of Williston, North Dakota, and on April 4, 1951, discovered oil on the Nesson Anticline, with the Amerada Hess Corporation Clarence Iverson #1 well. Other oil firms rushed in to buy up leases on farm land to explore for oil and by 1954 80% of the possible oil producing areas were under lease. Royal Dutch Shell at that time had leases on over 8 million acres. Many local farmers and area speculators became instant millionaires, leasing land at an average of $25 an acre and then selling those leases back at a much higher cost per acre.

Production peaked in 1986, and then decreased. In the early 2000s significant increases in production began because of horizontal drilling techniques (fracking), especially in the Bakken Formation.

Cumulative basin production totals about 3.8 billion barrels (600,000,000 m^{3}) of oil and 470 billion cubic feet (1.3×10^{10} m^{3}) of natural gas. The largest oil fields are listed in the following table, showing estimated ultimate recoveries.

Field Name	Discovery Year	Est. ult. oil (million barrels)	Est. ult. gas (billion cubic feet)	Est. ult. nat. gas liquids (million barrels)
Elm Coulee, Richland Co., MT	2000	270		
Beaver Lodge, N. Dak.	1951	130	115	47
Pine, Mont.	1952	127	20	
Pennel, Mont.	1955	115		
Cabin Creek, Mont.	1953	115		
Little Knife, N. Dak.	1977	96	120	15
Tioga, N. Dak.	1952	77	43	17
Blue Buttes, N. Dak.	1955	53	36	5
Charlson, N. Dak.	1952	52	100	11

=== Potash ===
Potash produced from the Williston Basin makes Canada the world's leading producer of that commodity. The deposits occur in the Middle Devonian Prairie Formation. Major potash-producing companies include Nutrien and Mosaic.

=== Coal ===
The Williston Basin holds large coal deposits, primarily in the Fort Union Formation of mostly Paleogene age, and were first noted during the Lewis and Clark Expedition. Mining of the coal began in 1873 near Sims, North Dakota, but was soon abandoned. The Northern Pacific Railway took over the mine and developed the lignite beds as the Northern Pacific Coal Company. Other mines followed near Minot, North Dakota and Dickinson, North Dakota, and the period from 1900 to 1920 saw a large-scale increase in the lignite industry. Strip-mining was common from 1920 until 1940, and 320 mines were in operation by 1940. However, production peaked in 1951, and by 1965, only 38 mines were in operation, while by 1999, only 4.

=== Helium ===
In 1952, helium concentrations were discovered in southwestern Saskatchewan. Production from four wells took place from 1963 to 1977, and resumed again in 2014. The Deadwood Formation, and other Lower Paleozoic formations, had the highest concentration. The helium originated through natural radioactive decay of uranium and thorium in Precambrian granitic basement rocks, or Lower Paleozoic shales.

== Geology ==
The Upper Cambrian Deadwood Formation was transgressively deposited on the low-relief Precambrian surface. The Deadwood is characterized by shallow marine and coastal plain sediments, with abundant glauconite giving the formation a distinctive green color. The basin started subsiding due to strike-slip movement along northeast–southwest trending faults, resulting in the deposition of the Winnipeg Group, which lies unconformably on the Deadwood. The Winnipeg consists of shallow marine sandstone, shale and shaly carbonate. The Red River Formation lies unconformably on the Winnipeg, and consists of shallow marine carbonate, anhydrite, and salt sedimentation. Conformably overlying the Red River is the Ordovician Stony Mountain Formation and Stonewall Formation, followed by the Silurian Interlake Group. During the Devonian, the Williston Basin became the southeastern corner of the Elk Point Basin when the Elk Point Group, Manitoba Group, and Saskatchewan Group were deposited. The Bakken Formation, an organic-rich marine shale, was deposited in the Late Devonian. The Lodgepole Limestone was deposited during the Mississippian, followed by the Madison Group and the Big Snowy Group. The Tyler Formation was deposited in the Pennsylvanian, and consists of interbedded sandstone, siltstone, shale, and limestone. The overlying Minnelusa Formation is characterized by deposition in alluvial plains, prograding river delta, and barrier island environments. The Minnekahta Formation was deposited during the Permian, followed by the Spearfish Formation and the Nesson Formation. The Pierre Shale was deposited curing the Cretaceous, followed by the Hell Creek Formation, and the Tertiary Fort Union Formation.

== Impact craters ==
Several confirmed impact craters are located in Williston Basin such as Viewfield, Red Wing Creek, and Eagle Butte while the Dumas and Hartney craters are still unconfirmed.

== See also ==
- List of possible impact structures on Earth
