= Bad Cache Rapids Group =

Geologic Group in Ontario

- Stratigraphic range: Ordovician
- Type: Group

Location
- Region: Ontario
- Country: Canada

The Bad Cache Rapids Group is a geologic Group in Ontario. It preserves fossils dating back to the Ordovician period.

== See also ==
- List of fossiliferous stratigraphic units in Ontario
