= Red River Formation =

Geologic formation in Canada

- Stratigraphic range: Caradoc to Ashgill
- Type: Geological formation
- Sub-units: Fort Garry Member; Selkirk Member; Cat Head Member; Dog Head Member
- Underlies: Stony Mountain Formation
- Overlies: Winnipeg Formation
- Thickness: up to 215 metres (710 ft)

Lithology
- Primary: limestone, dolomite
- Other: Breccia

Location
- Coordinates: 51.9482°N 98.0563°W
- Region: WCSB; Williston Basin
- Country: Canada; United States

Type section
- Named for: Red River of the North
- Named by: A.F. Foerste
- Year defined: 1929

The Red River Formation is a lithostratigraphical unit of Late Ordovician age in the Williston Basin.

It takes the name from the Red River of the North, and was first described in outcrop in the Tyndall Stone quarries and along the Red River Valley by A.F. Foerste in 1929.

== Lithology ==
=== Subdivisions ===
The Red River Formation is composed of the following subdivisions from top to base:

- Fort Garry Member: crystalline and micritic dolomite with an argillaceous dolomite breccia in the middle
- Selkirk Member: fossiliferous, dolomitic limestone
- Cat Head Member: cherty dolomite, becoming calcareous to the south
- Dog Head Member: fossiliferous dolomitic limestone

== Distribution ==
The Red River Formation reaches a maximum thickness of 215 metres (710 ft) in the center of the Williston Basin. It extends throughout the Manitoba outcrop belt, and can be correlated throughout the entire Williston Basin area. It is 150 metres (490 ft) thick and thins out to less than 50m (164 ft) northwards.

== Relationship to other units ==
The Red River Formation is slightly unconformably overlain by the Stony Mountain Formation and sharply overlays the Winnipeg Formation in Manitoba, the Deadwood Formation in western Saskatchewan and the Canadian Shield in northern Manitoba.

The lower Red River Formation is equivalent to the Yeoman Formation, while the Fort Garry Member correlates with the Herald Formation.
