= Stonewall Formation =

Geologic formation in Canada

- Stratigraphic range: Ashgill to Alexandrian
- Type: Geological formation
- Underlies: Interlake Group
- Overlies: Stony Mountain Formation
- Thickness: up to 34 metres (110 ft)

Lithology
- Primary: dolomite
- Other: Sandstone, anhydrite

Location
- Coordinates: 50.1186°N 97.7239°W
- Region: WCSB; Williston Basin
- Country: Canada

Type section
- Named for: Stonewall, Manitoba
- Named by: E.M. Kindle, 1914

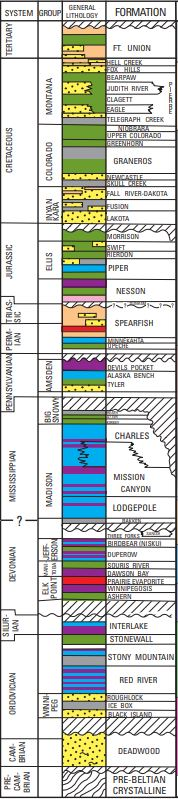
Stonewall Formation within Williston Basin stratigraphy

The Stonewall Formation is a stratigraphic unit of Late Ordovician to Early Silurian age in the Western Canadian Sedimentary Basin.

It takes the name from Stonewall, Manitoba, and was first described in the Stonewall quarry by E.M. Kindle in 1914.

== Lithology ==
The Stonewall Formation is composed of finely crystalline dolomite, with a basal argillaceous and sandy dolomite (the Williams Member). Two thin sandstone beds occur in the middle and at the top of the formation. In the central Williston basin, the base is marked by an anhydrite bed.

== Distribution ==
The Stonewall Formation occurs at surface in the Manitoba outcrop belt and in the sub-surface in the Williston Basin. It reaches a maximum thickness of 34 metres (110 ft).

== Relationship to other units ==
The Stonewall Formation is overlain by the Interlake Group (conformably in the south, disconformably in the north) and sharply overlays the Stony Mountain Formation.
