= Interlake Formation =

Interlake Formation (Group)
- Stratigraphic range: Llandovery to Ludlow
- Type: Geological formation
- Underlies: Ashern Formation
- Overlies: Stonewall Formation
- Thickness: up to 335 metres (1,100 ft)

Lithology
- Primary: dolomite

Location
- Coordinates: 51.4535°N 98.7603°W
- Region: WCSB; Williston Basin
- Country: Canada, United States

Type section
- Named for: Interlake Region, Manitoba
- Named by: A.D. Baillie, 1951

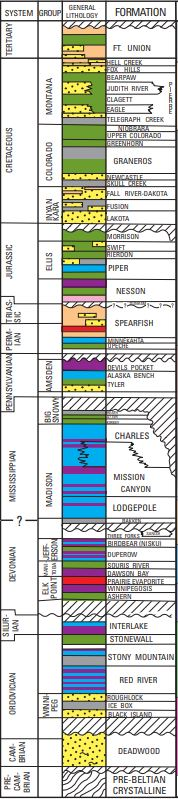
Interlake Formation within Williston Basin stratigraphy

The Interlake Formation is a stratigraphical unit of Silurian age in the Western Canadian Sedimentary Basin.

It takes the name from the Interlake Region in Manitoba, and was first described in outcrop by A.D. Baillie in 1951.

== Lithology ==
The Interlake Formation is composed of very finely crystalline dolomite. Oolitic, stromatolitic and biohermal interbeds also occur.

== Distribution ==
The Interlake Formation is present throughout the Williston Basin. It reaches a maximum thickness of 335 metres (1,100 ft) in the subsurface of North Dakota, and is typically up to 110 metres (360 ft) thick in outcrop in its type locality.

== Relationship to other units ==
The Interlake Formation is overlain with an angular unconformably by the Ashern Formation and sharply overlays the Stonewall Formation.

In the sub-surface it is given group status and contains, in different regions, the following subdivisions:

- Strathclair, Brandon and Cedar Lake Formations
- Lower, Middle and Upper Interlake
- Rupert, Hansen and Risser Formations
- Strathclair, Fife Lake, Guernsey, Cedar Lake and Taylorton Formations
