= List of fossiliferous stratigraphic units in Indiana =

This article contains a list of fossil-bearing stratigraphic units in the state of Indiana, U.S.

== Sites ==
Group or Formation	Period	Notes
Beech Creek Formation	Carboniferous	
Beechwood Limestone	Devonian	
Big Clifty Formation	Carboniferous	
Block Coal Formation	Carboniferous	
Brassfield Formation	Silurian	
Brazil Formation	Carboniferous	
Bull Fork Formation	Ordovician	
Carbondale Formation	Carboniferous	
Carwood Formation	Carboniferous	
Davis Formation	Cambrian	
Dillsboro Formation	Ordovician	
Eau Claire Formation	Cambrian	
Edwardsville Limestone	Carboniferous	
Excello Shale	Carboniferous	
Fairview Formation	Ordovician	
Glen Dean Limestone	Carboniferous	
Golconda Formation	Carboniferous	
Hamilton Formation	Devonian	
Haney Limestone	Carboniferous	
Harrodsburg Limestone	Carboniferous	
Jeffersonville Limestone	Devonian	
Carbondale Formation	Carboniferous	
Spoon Formation	Carboniferous	
Kokomo Formation	Silurian	
Lampasas Group/Kanawha Formation	Carboniferous	
Laurel Limestone	Silurian	
Liberty Formation	Ordovician	
Linton Formation	Carboniferous	
Locust Point Formation	Carboniferous	
Logan Formation	Carboniferous	
Louisville Formation	Silurian	
Mansfield Formation	Carboniferous	
Fairview Formation	Ordovician	
McMillan Formation	Ordovician	
Shelburn Formation	Carboniferous	
McLeansboro Group/Shelburn Formation	Carboniferous	
Muldraugh Formation	Carboniferous	
New Albany Shale	Carboniferous, Devonian	
New Albany Shale/Blackiston Formation	Devonian	
Oregonia Formation	Ordovician	
Osgood Formation	Silurian	
Osgood Limestone	Silurian	
Osgood Shale	Silurian	
Perth Limestone	Carboniferous	
Petersburg Formation	Carboniferous	
Pottsville Formation	Carboniferous	
Raccoon Creek Group/Mansfield Formation	Carboniferous	
Ramp Creek Formation	Carboniferous	
Richmond Formation	Ordovician	
Dillsboro Formation	Ordovician	
Arnheim Formation	Ordovician	
Dillsboro Formation	Ordovician	
Elkhorn Formation	Ordovician	
Liberty Formation	Ordovician	
Waynesville Formation	Ordovician	
Whitewater Formation	Ordovician	
Roaring Creek Coal	Carboniferous	
Rockford Limestone	Carboniferous	
Salamonie Dolomite	Silurian	
Salem Limestone	Carboniferous	
Saluda Formation	Ordovician	
Sellersburg Group/Beechwood Formation	Devonian	
Shelburn Formation	Carboniferous	
Silver Creek Formation	Devonian	
Speeds Formation	Devonian	
Staunton Coals	Carboniferous	
Ste. Genevieve Formation	Carboniferous	
Tanners Creek Formation	Ordovician	
Tar Springs Formation	Carboniferous	
Traverse Group	Devonian	
Whitewater Formation	Ordovician	
Wabash Formation	Silurian	
Waldron Shale	Silurian	
Waynesville Formation	Ordovician	

== See also ==
- Paleontology in Indiana
