= Cincinnati Arch =

Geologic uplift in the Midwestern United States

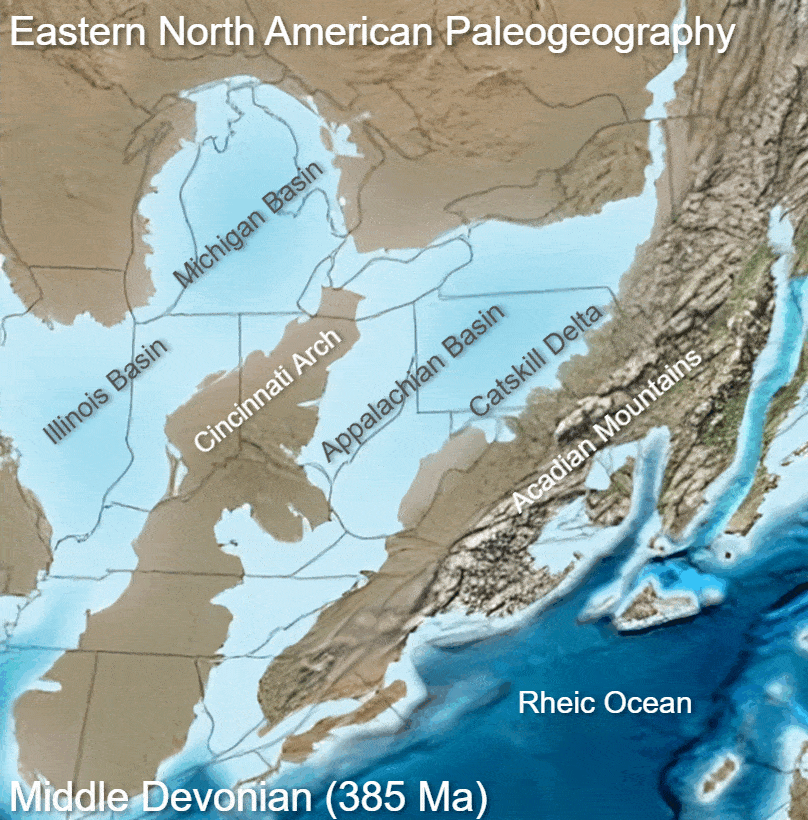
Middle Devonian paleogeography

The Cincinnati Arch is a broad structural uplift between the Illinois Basin to the west, the Michigan Basin to the northwest, and the Appalachian Basin and Black Warrior Basin to the east and southeast. It existed as a positive topographic area during late Ordovician through the Devonian period which stretched from northern Alabama northeastward to the southeastern tip of Ontario. Fossils from the Ordovician are commonplace in the geologic formations which make up the Cincinnati Arch and are commonly studied along man made roadcuts. The Nashville Dome of Tennessee and the Jessamine Dome or Lexington Dome of central Kentucky make up the central portion of the arch. In the northern part, north of Cincinnati, Ohio, the Cincinnati Arch branches to form the Findlay and Kankakee arches. The Findlay plunges under Ontario and reappears as the Algonquin Arch further north.

Petroleum was first discovered in a relatively low part of the arch, between the Jessamine and Nashville domes, the Cumberland Saddle, in Cumberland County, Kentucky, in 1829. The saddle and adjoining areas have been significant producers since drilling for oil came to the region in the late 19th century.

== Formations ==
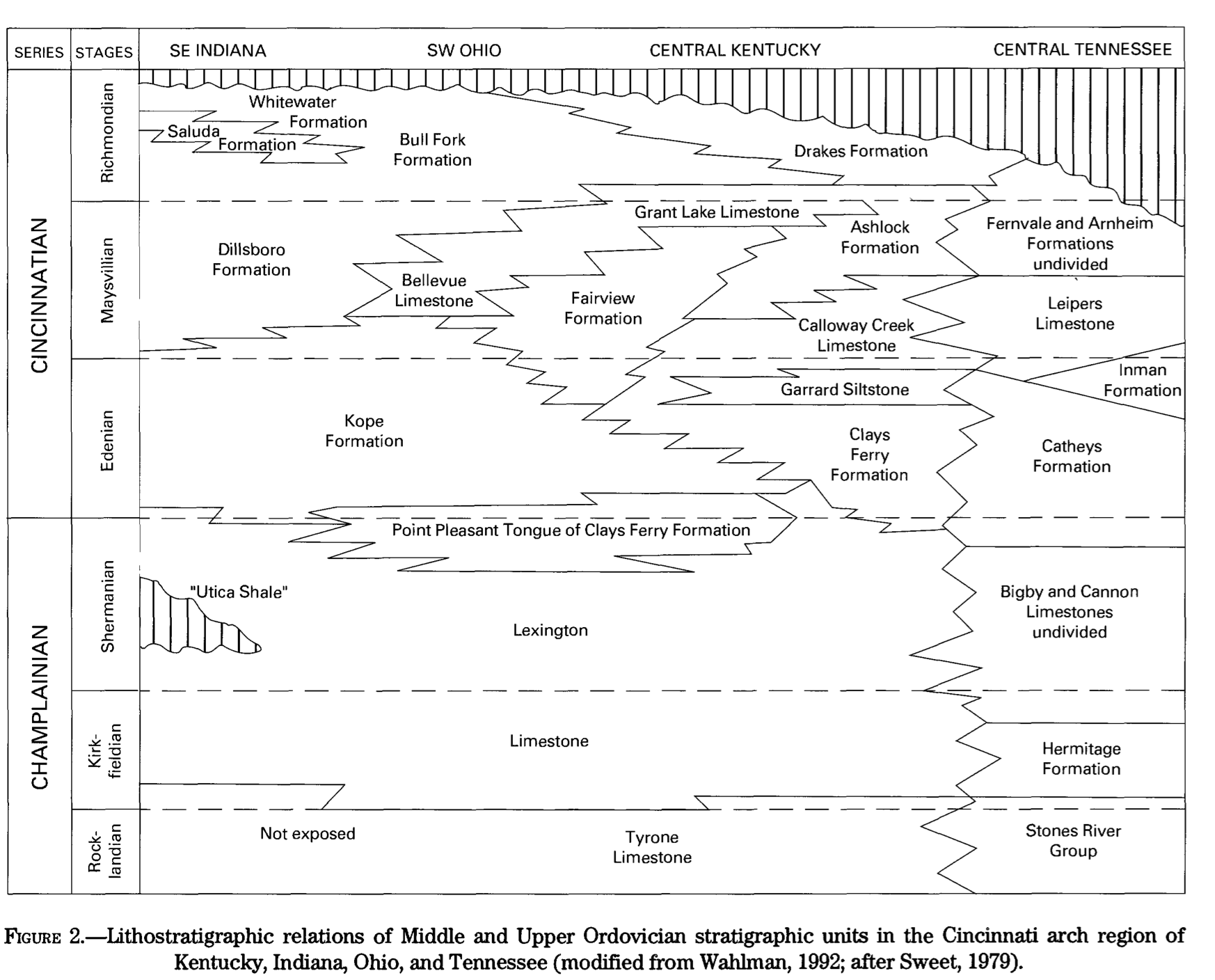
Cincinnati Arch Formations and Layers

The Cincinnati Arch contains three distinct stages: the Edenain, Maysvillian, and the Richmondian. The Edenian stage is the oldest stage of the three. The Edenian contains these formations: Kope, Clays Ferry, Garrard Siltstone, Catheys, Inman, Fairview, and Leipers Limestone. The Maysvillian is the second oldest stage containing these formations: Dillsboro, Kope, Bellevue, Fairview, Grant Lake Limestone, Ashlock, Calloway Creek, Leipers, Fernvale, and Arnheim. The most recent stage is the Richmondian. The Richmondian contains: Bull Fork, Saluda, Whitewater, Drakes and parts of Grant Lake Limestone as well as Fernvale and Arnheim. Formations can be a part of only one stage or in multiple stages depending on how old they are. Formations can also be represented in multiple states depending on how far they reach.

== Geology ==
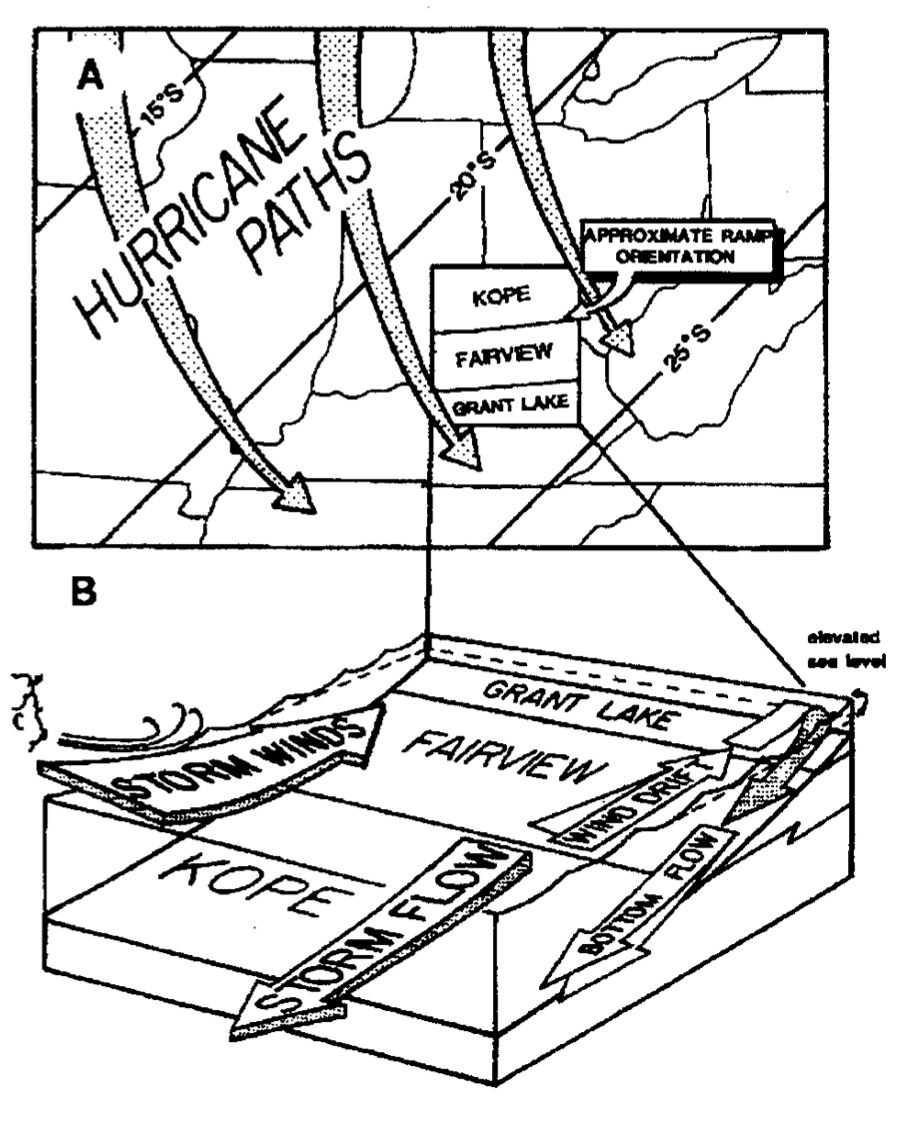
Model of tropical storms effects on Cincinnati Arch region in the Ordovician

The Cincinnati Arch formed from ocean sediments deposited between 488 and 444 million years ago on the North American Continent. The geology is characterized by layers of shale interspersed with layers of fossiliferous limestone. Layers of shale are believed to have formed from sediment deposited by large hurricanes. Shale layers can represent as little as a single day of sediment deposition. Shale layers indicate times of low ocean levels when erosion brought out more sediment from the continent into the sea.

Fossiliferous limestone is made up of beds of previously organic matter that has undergone permineralization and fossilized forming large mats of calcite and aragonite rich rock. These layers represent periods of sediment starvation when sea levels were elevated and the impact of tropical storms was negligible. In the most recent formations such as White Water there is a shift as ocean levels dramatically drop and the Cincinnati Arch comes above the water line; after this point there is little sedimentation.

== Fossils and species ==
The Ordovician period contained many marine animals. These animals can be found fossilized in the layers of the Cincinnati Arch. The types of animals that appear in these formations are: bryozoans, gastropods, cephalopods, horn corals, brachiopods, crinoids, and trilobites. Different species of each family can be found throughout the layers in the region, with different concentrations depending on the formation. A typical fossil that is common in many road-cuts around the arch is the extinct Isorthoceras albersi.

== Roadcuts ==
The geologic layers that make up the Cincinnati Arch are most easily viewed at roadcuts. Roadcuts are common along highways throughout the arch's range and are often studied by geologists and paleontologists alike. Since roadcuts are typically made quite steep they allow scientists to view changes in prehistoric conditions through millions of years by studying the differences between layers in a vertical column. Laws can vary state to state, but in most cases collecting or working at these sites is legal as long as the roadcut is not located on an interstate highway. Popular roadcuts in the Cincinnati Arch can be found in Ohio, Indiana, and Kentucky. The most prominent of these roadcuts is one located near Maysville, Kentucky, known as the "Maysville roadcut."
