= List of Ordovician lagerstätten =

Fossil sites from the Ordovician period

The list of Ordovician Lagerstätten is a documentation of Lagerstätte fossils sites around the world, dated to the Ordovician period. These are characterized by exceptional preservation of fossil organisms, regularly including many well-preserved animals and their soft tissue remains. The extent of Lagerstätten deposits can range from a select site or stratigraphic layer to a whole formation or group.

== Criteria ==
Sites on the list must either:

1. Be referred to as a Lagerstätte within the main text of at least one scientific publication. Similar terms, such as 'exceptional preservation', do not qualify.
2. Have fossils that fulfill the criteria of Konservat-Lagerstätte as set within Kimmig & Schiffbauer (2024): Konservat-Lagerstätten are characterized by exceptional preservation, and at least 5% of the fossils recovered from a site must preserve either soft tissue remains or nearly complete individuals, preferably both.

Color key
Konservat

== Lagerstätten ==
Site(s)	Age	Location	Significance	Notable fossils/organisms
Osterberg biotas (Deadwood and Winnipeg formations)	~485 and 460 Ma (Tremadocian – Darriwilian)	North Dakota, US	Two distinct layers preserving small carbonaceous fossils: microscopic mouthparts from molluscs, priapulids, arthropods, conodonts, and worms. Illustrates cryptic ecological innovations in a shallow tropical environment, a combination unlike most Ordovician Lagerstätten.	
Fezouata Formation	~485 Ma	Draa Valley, Morocco	It was deposited in a marine environment, and is known for its exceptionally preserved fossils, filling an important preservational window beyond the earlier and more common Cambrian Burgess shale-type deposits.	Aegirocassis, a giant hurdiid radiodont
Afon Gam biota	Tremadocian	Northern Wales, UK	A formation with Burgess-type preservation that preserves a shallow-water sponge reef ecosystem with abundant algae, trilobites, brachiopods, echinoderms, a mollisoniid, and the smallest known radiodont. Likely represents a volcanically unstable ecosystem. Is a part of the Dol-cyn-Afon Formation.	
Fenxiang Formation	Tremadocian - earliest Floian	Hubei, China	A fossil site that preserves a diverse reef ecosystem, including bryozoans, black corals, and hydroids in addition to trilobites, brachiopods, dendroid graptolites, and cephalopods.	
Tonggao Biota	Floian	Guizhou, China	A site known for its preservation of brachiopods, graptolites, trilobites, worms, and various echinoderms and arthropods. The fauna from a deep water environment.	
Cabrières Biota	Floian	Montagne Noire, France	A polar marine ecosystem from the Early Ordovician that likely served as a refuge from the high temperatures of the epoch. Has been argued that the site is not a lagerstätte and some of the supposed organisms represent trace fossils. This interpretation was contested by the original authors. Another paper on the site have described the formation as a polar delta that was influenced by waves.	Artistic reconstruction of the Cabrières Biota
Liexi fauna	~470 Ma (early-middle Floian)	Hunan Province, China	Preserves Early Ordovician fauna with soft tissue, including not only Cambrian relics but also taxa that originated during the Ordovician. Is a part of the Madaoyu Formation.	
Ziyang Fauna	Floian	Ziyang County, Shaanxi, China	A site from the GOBE that preserves trilobite, graptolite, brachiopod, and arthropod remains. It is a part of the Madaoyu Formation.	
Canelas quarry, (Valongo Formation)	Middle Darriwilian	Arouca Geopark, northern Portugal	A site that provides numerous trilobites including some of the largest in the world, which may have been caused by polar gigantism.	Hungoides bohemica, a giant trilobite
Castle Bank	About 461 Ma	Llandrindod Wells, Wales, UK	A unique environment deposited during the middle Ordovician that possibly indicates that iconic groups from Cambrian Lagerstätten, like opabiniids and megacheirans, survived longer than previously thought.	Diagram of Mieridduryn, an opabiniid-like panarthropod
Llandegley Rocks Lagerstätte	Late Darriwilian	Llandrindod Wells, Wales, UK	A site from the same group and general location as Castle Bank that preserves sponges and echinoderms in volcanically influenced sandstones.	
Klabava Formation	Floian-Dapingian	Western Czech Republic	A site that preserves a diverse assemblage of dendroid and graptoloid graptolites, in addition to preserving brachiopods, trilobites, an aglaspidid, palaeoscolecid worms, and chaetognaths.	
San José Formation	Darriwilian	Huancampa, Peru	A site that is currently known for preserving the worm Juninscolex.	
Šárka Formation	Darriwilian	Western Czech Republic	A site that preserves Graptolites, worms, sponges, and trilobites.	
Llanfallteg Formation	Darriwilian	South Wales, UK	A site with Burgess-type preservation known for its preservation of xenopods, trilobites, marrellomorphs, and annelids. Preserves fauna from a deep water environment.	
Douglas Dam Member	460 Ma	Tennessee, US	Low-diversity assemblage of arthropod fossils, which are preserved well because of volcanic ash.	Chasmataspis, a horseshoe crab-like chasmataspid arthropod
Winneshiek Shale	460 Ma	Decorah, Iowa, US	A Middle Ordovician site confined to a large impact crater that is known for exceptionally exquisite preservation of conodonts, bivalved arthropods, and the earliest eurypterids in the fossil record.	Pentecopterus, the oldest known eurypterid
Beecher's Trilobite Bed	460? Ma	New York, US	Noted exceptionally preserved trilobites with soft tissue preserved by pyrite replacement. Pyritisation allows the use of X-rays to study fine detail of preserved soft body parts.	A pair of Triarthrus trilobites with pyritized soft-tissue
Letná Formation	460-450 Ma	Czech Republic	A site known for its fossil echinoderms, brachiopods, conulariids, and trilobites.	
Harding Sandstone	? (Sandbian)	Colorado, US	Although preservation is not excellent, this lagoonal site provides early vertebrate fossils such as Astraspis and Eriptychius.	Eriptychius, an early agnathan
Homotelus Beds	Early Sandbian	Oklahoma, US	A site that preserves numerous Homotelus trilobites preserved during molting and mating.	An assemblage of Homotelus from the site
Girvan Lagerstätte	Sandbian	Southwestern Scotland, UK	A site in known mainly for its trilobites. Three-dimensionally preserved graptolites and conodonts have also been found. Fossils are from the Balclatchie Formation.	
Vasalemma Formation	Late Sandbian	Northern Estonia	A site that produces algal remains within a patch reef system.	
Walcott-Rust Quarry	~455? Ma	New York, US	This site is an excellent example of an obrution (rapid burial or "smothered") Lagerstätte. Unique preservation of trilobite appendages resulted from early cementation of the surrounding rock and spar filling of the interior cavity of the appendages.	Isotelus gigas, a large asaphid trilobite
Big Hill Lagerstätte	~450? Mya	Michigan, US	A site known for its preservation of soft-bodied medusae (jellyfish), as well as linguloid brachiopods, algae, and arthropods (namely chasmataspidids, leperditid ostracods, and eurypterids).	Hoplitaspis, a chasmataspid arthropod
Brechin Lagerstätte (Including the Bobcaygeon and Verulam Formations)	450 Ma	Ontario, Canada	Known for preserving one of the most diverse crinoid fauna of the Katian.	Tomlinsonus, a marrellomorph
N'kob Biota	Latest Darriwilian	Zagora, Morocco	A high latitude biota within the Ouine Inirne Formation during the GOBE that preserves Arthropods, echinoderms, sponges, hyoliths, conulariids, and graptolites.	
Tafilalt Biota (including the Izgguirene, Lower Ktaoua, Upper Tiouririne, and Khabt-el-Hajar Formations.)	? (Sandbian-middle Katian)	Tafilalt, Morocco	Known from a range of non-biomineralised and soft-bodied organisms in polar environments. It shows examples of polar gigantism with Tafilocaris.	Discophyllum peltatum, an eldoniid
Llanfawr Mudstones	Basal Sandbian	Wales, UK	A site known for pyritized trilobites, sponges, and cnidarians. Would have been at a depth between 100–300 metres (330–980 ft).	
Fuping Biota	Early Katian	Shaanxi, China	Belongs to the Zhaolaoyu Formation. Preserves arthropods, including eurypterids, cheloniellids, and aglaspidids. Bivalved arthropods, conodonts, and worms are also known from this site. Preserves fauna from a deep-water environment.	
Cat Head Member	? (middle Katian)	Manitoba, Canada	Fossils like algae, conulariids, and trilobites are known from this site.	
Whetstone Gulf Formation	Katian	New York, US	A biota showing Beecher's-type preservation. Many trilobites preserving pyritized soft tissues are known.	
Vauréal Formation	Katian	Anticosti Island, Quebec, Canada	Preserves the earliest known acoelomorphs, nemerteans, nematodes, and flatworms in the fossil record.	
Neuville Lagerstätte	Katian	Québec City region, Quebec, Canada	A site within the Trenton Group that preserves echinoderms, trilobites, brachiopods, and various other marine invertebrates. Notably, this site preserves the soft tissue of the crinoid Dendrocrinus, including the earliest evidence of tube feet within the group.	
Moranburg Shale	Katian (Edenian)	Ohio, US	A part of the "Butter Shales" of the Cincinnati Arch. This shale belongs to the Kope Formation. The shale contains many species of trilobites.	
Collingwood Shale Member	Katian (Edenian)	Ontario, Canada	A trilobite Lagerstätte that preserves articulated Ceraurus, Flexicalymene, and Isotelus	
Fairview Formation	Katian (Maysvillian)	Kentucky, US	A Lagerstätte containing an assemblage of the crinoid Glyptocrinus decadactylus with over 400 specimens recovered.	
Western Hills Trilobite Shale	Katian (Maysvillian)	Ohio, US	A part of the "Butter Shales" of the Cincinnati Arch. This shale belongs to the Grant Lake Formation. The shale contains many species of trilobites.	
Dent Trilobite Shale	Katian (Richmondian)	Ohio, US	A part of the "Butter Shales" of the Cincinnati Arch. This shale belongs to the Arnheim Formation. The shale contains many species of trilobites.	
Mt. Orab Shale	Katian (Richmondian)	Ohio, US	A part of the "Butter Shales" of the Cincinnati Arch. This shale belongs to the Arnheim Formation. The shale contains many species of trilobites.	
Harpers Run submember	Katian (Richmondian)	Indiana, US	A part of the "Butter Shales" of the Cincinnati Arch. This shale belongs to the Waynesville Formation. The shale contains many species of trilobites.	
Oldenburg submember	Katian (Richmondian)	Indiana, US	A part of the "Butter Shales" of the Cincinnati Arch. This shale belongs to the Waynesville Formation. The shale contains many species of trilobites.	
Roaring Brook submember	Katian (Richmondian)	Ohio, US	A part of the "Butter Shales" of the Cincinnati Arch. This shale belongs to the Waynesville Formation. The shale contains many species of trilobites.	
F. minuens shale	Katian (Richmondian)	Indiana, US	A part of the "Butter Shales" of the Cincinnati Arch. This shale belongs to the Liberty Formation. Known for its abundant remains of Flexicalymene.	A specimen of Flexicalymene retorsa minuens, a specimen found commonly within the Butter Shale
Llanddowror Crinoid Pavement	Katian	Llanddowror, Wales, UK	A crinoid site found during the construction of a road cut that preserves articulated, crinoid fossils in a 25 millimetres (0.98 in) thick layer.	
Georgian Bay Formation	449–445.6 Ma	Manitoulin District, Canada	Low-diversity assemblage of arthropod fossils.	Orcanopterus, a mid-sized waeringopterid eurypterid
William Lake (Stony Mountain Formation)	445 Ma	Manitoba, Canada	Well-preserved fossils such as jellyfish, xiphosurans, and sea spiders are known from this site; it is important because many of these fossils are unknown elsewhere in the Ordovician.	Lunataspis aurora, an early xiphosuran known in two sites
Airport Cove	445 Ma	Manitoba, Canada	Fossils like eurypterids, algae, and xiphosurans are preserved in this site.	Lunataspis aurora, an early xiphosuran known in two sites
Soom Shale	Hirnantian	South Africa	Known for its remarkable preservation of soft tissue in fossil material, including in fossils of arthropods and conodonts. This site was deposited in cold waters after the peak of the Late Ordovician glaciation, during a period of post-glacial transgression. Bioturbation is mostly absent, suggesting a mostly anoxic environment.	Promissum, a conodont known from rare soft-tissues
Anji Biota	445 Ma	Zhejiang, China	A site from immediately after the Late Ordovician Extinction Event that showcases massive sponge diversity, with thousands of specimens known from over 75 species. Additionally, many graptolites, rare molluscs, and the eurypterid Archopterus were recovered.	A digital artwork of the animals found at the site
