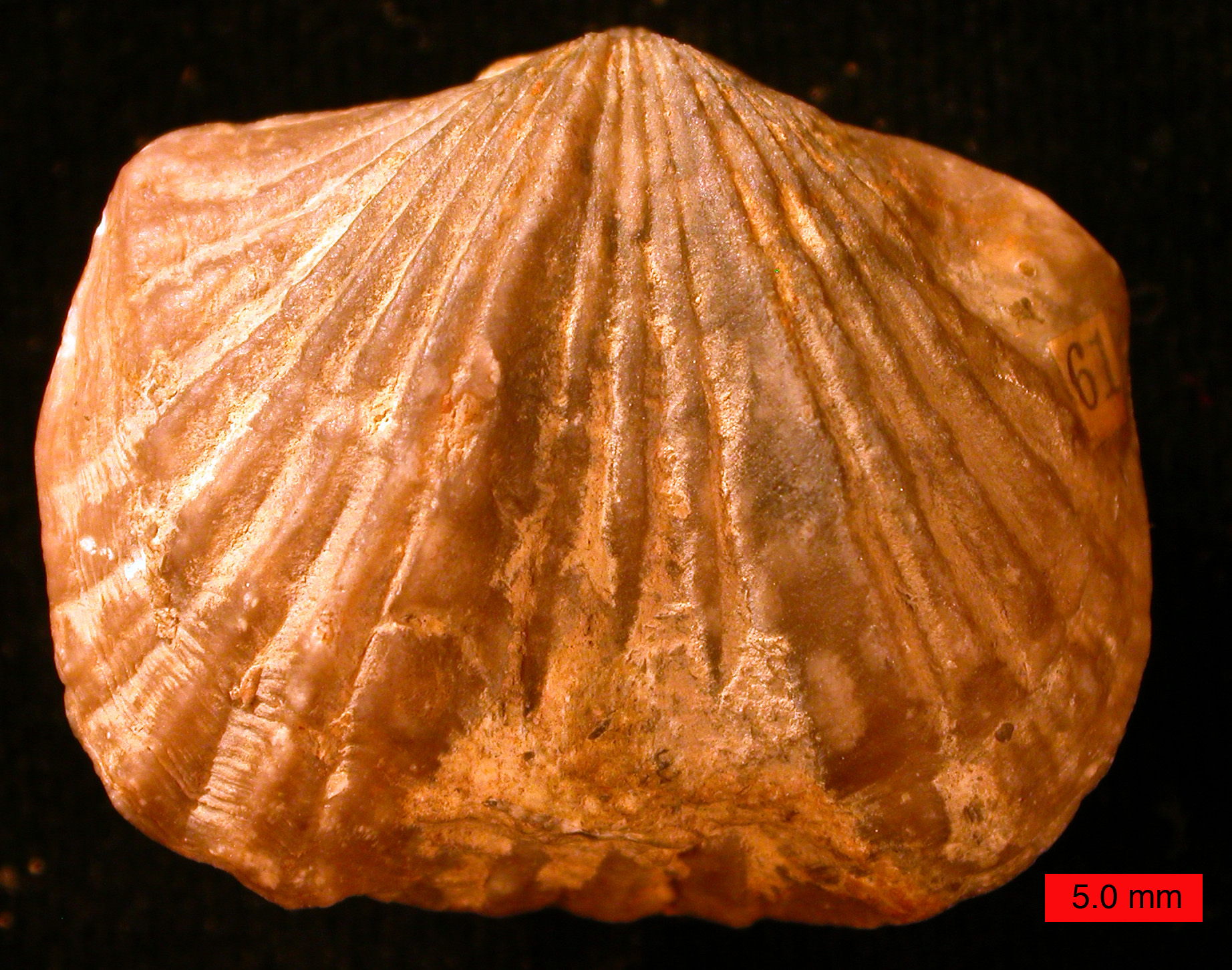
- Platystrophia ponderosa (Ordovician)

Scientific classification
- Kingdom: Animalia
- Phylum: Brachiopoda
- Class: Rhynchonellata
- Order: †Orthida
- Family: †Platystrophiidae
- Genus: †Platystrophia; King, 1850

Type species
- Terebratulites biforatus Schlotheim, 1820

Species
- See Species.

= Platystrophia =

Platystrophia Temporal range: Darriwilian-Lochkovian ~468–419 Ma

Extinct genus of brachiopods

Platystrophia is an extinct genus of brachiopods that lived from the Ordovician to the Silurian in Asia, Europe, North America, and South America. It has a prominent sulcus and fold. It usually lived in marine lime mud and sands.

== Distribution ==
Platystrophia ponderosa has been found in the Fairview and Oregonia (=Arnheim) Formations, Platystrophia clarksvillensis in the Waynesville and Liberty Formations, and Platystrophia cypha from Grant Lake to the Liberty Formations. In South America, the genus is found in the Ordovician San Juan Formation of Argentina and the Caparo Formation of Venezuela.

== Species ==
Species in the genus Platystrophia include:

- P. acutilirata (Conrad, 1842)
- P. amoena McEwan, 1919
- P. annieana Foerste, 1910
- P. anomala Hiller, 1980
- P. baltica Zuykov and Harper, 2007
- P. biforatus (Schlotheim, 1820)
- P. caelata Williams, 1974
- P. chama Eichwald, 1861
- P. clarkvillensis Foerste, 1910
- P. colbiensis Foerste, 1910
- P. costata Zuykov, 2000
- P. costatus (Pander, 1830)
- P. crassoplicata Alichova, 1951
- P. cypha (James, 1874)
- P. dentata Pander, 1830
- P. elegantula McEwan, 1919
- P. extensa McEwan, 1920
- P. hongueda
- P. hopensis (Foerste, 1910)
- P. humilis Li and Copper, 2006
- P. laticosta (James, 1871)
- P. lutkevichi Alikhova, 1951
- P. lynx Eichwald, 1830
- P. orbiculata Oraspold, 1959
- P. pogrebovi Zuykov and Harper, 2007
- P. ponderosa Foerste, 1909
- P. profundosulcata (Meek, 1873)
- P. putilovensis Zuykov, 1999
- P. quadriplicata Alikhova, 1951
- P. saxbyensis Oraspold, 1959
- P. scotica Williams, 1962
- P. tramorensis Liljeroth et al., 2017
- P. trentonensis McEwan, 1919
