= Carbondale Group =

Geologic group of rock found in Illinois basin

- Stratigraphic range: Middle Pennsylvanian
- Type: Geological group
- Sub-units: Dugger Formation; Petersburg Formation; Linton Formation
- Underlies: McLeansboro Group
- Overlies: Raccoon Creek Group

Lithology
- Primary: Shale, Siltstone
- Other: Sandstone, Coal

Location
- Region: Illinois Basin
- Country: United States

Type section
- Named for: Carbondale, Illinois

The Carbondale Group is a Middle Pennsylvanian aged unit found in the Illinois Basin. This geologic unit is made up of siliciclastic rock and coal beds.

== Description ==
The Carbondale is made up of mostly siliciclastic lithology. There are several coal beds as well as well as some limestone member units. Some coal beds are commercially viable and a number of mines extract coal from this geologic unit.

== Stratigraphy ==
=== Dugger formation ===
The Dugger formation is at the top and therefore the youngest of the group. This formation contains more sandstone and serves as an aquifer for domestic use.

=== Petersburg Formation ===
The Petersburg formation also contains sandstone members that are used as aquifers.

=== Linton Formation ===
The Linton Formation is a geologic formation in Indiana. It is the lower formation in the Carbondale Group, and includes six named members, "which, in ascending order, are the Seelyville Coal, Coxville Sandstone, Colchester Coal, Mecca Quarry Shale, Velpen Limestone, and Survant Coal Members, and unnamed units of sandstone, shale, and clay".

It preserves fossils dating back to the Carboniferous period.

The Linton Formation was first named on a United States Geological Survey coal investigations map in 1950. The type locality is along the tributaries of Lattas Creek, approximately 4 miles north of Linton, Greene County, Indiana.
