= Point Pleasant Formation =

Geologic formation in Ohio, United States

- Stratigraphic range: Middle Ordovician
- Type: Formation
- Underlies: Cincinnati Group and Kope Formation
- Overlies: Lexington Limestone and Trenton Limestone

Location
- Country: United States
- Extent: Ohio
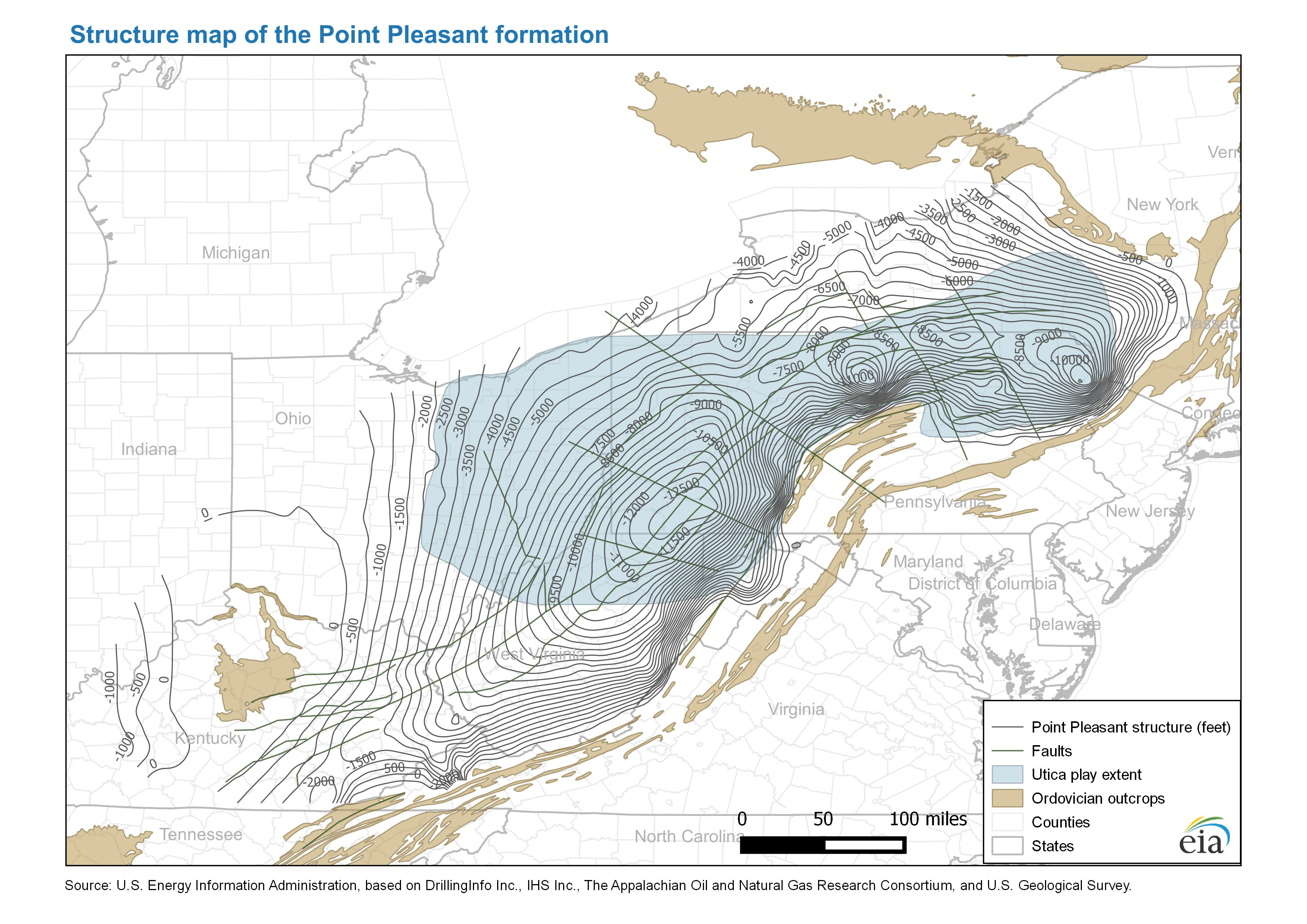
- A structure map of the Point Pleasant formation

The Point Pleasant Formation is a geologic formation in Ohio. It dates back to the Middle Ordovician.
