= Lampasas (disambiguation) =

Lampasas may stand for:

- Lampasas, Texas
- Lampasas County, Texas
- Lampasas River
- Lampasas Independent School District
- Lampasas High School
- Lampasas Group, a geologic group in Indiana
