= Kope Formation =

Bedrock formation found in the Midwestern United States

- Stratigraphic range: Katian
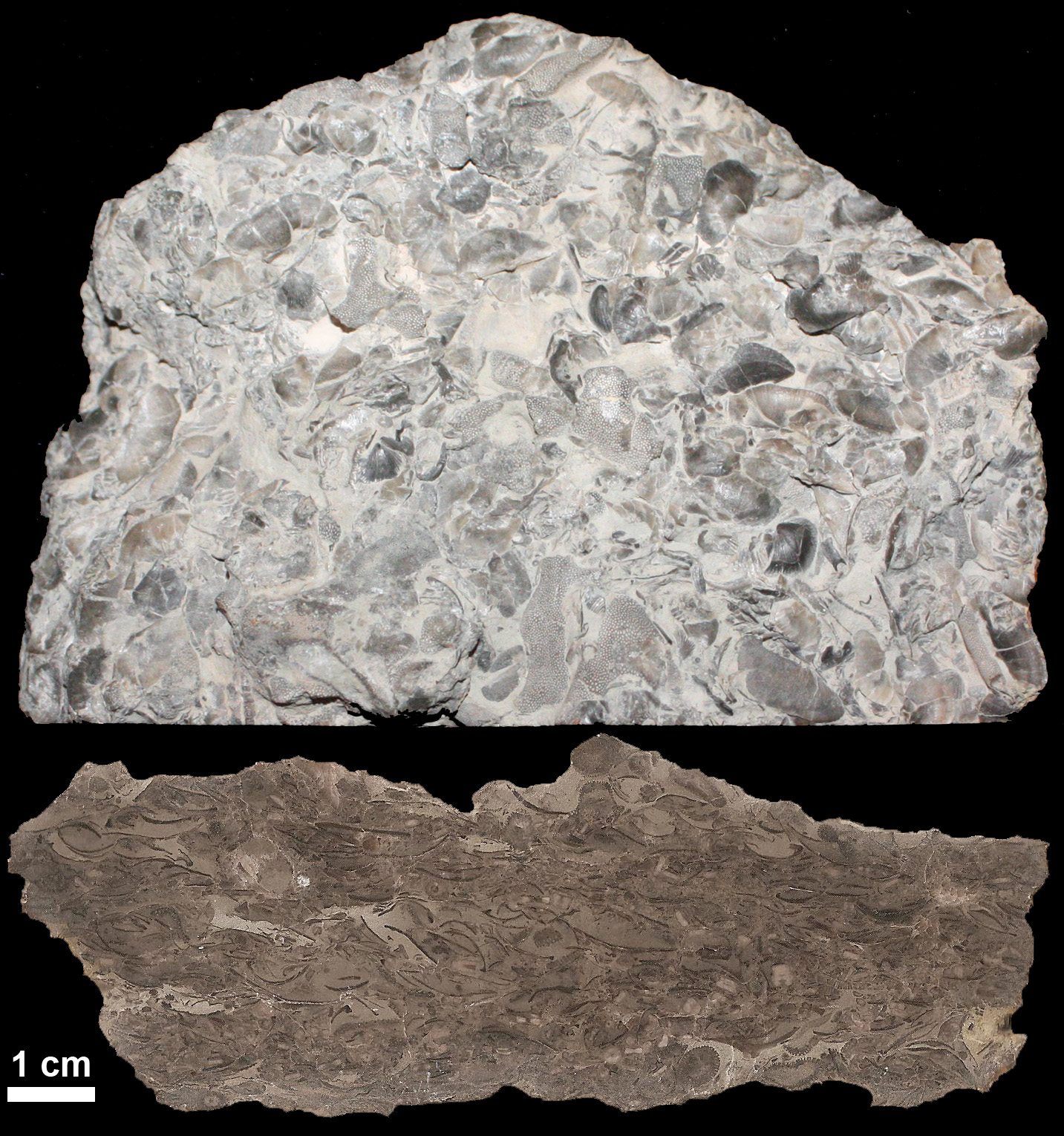
- Photograph and etched section of hand sample of limestone of Kope Formation. Brachiopods and Bryozoans visible.
- Type: sedimentary
- Unit of: Maquoketa Group, (in Indiana) Cincinnati Group (in Ohio)
- Sub-units: Grand Avenue Member, Wesselman Tongue
- Underlies: Dillsboro Formation and Fairview Formation
- Overlies: Lexington Limestone, Plattin Formation, and Point Pleasant Formation

Lithology
- Primary: Shale
- Other: Limestone

Location
- Region: Cincinnati Arch of North America
- Extent: Kentucky, Ohio, Indiana

The Kope Formation is one of the three component bedrock formations of the Maquoketa Group that primarily consists of shale (75%) with some limestone (25%) interbedded. In general, it has a bluish-gray color that weathers light gray to yellowish-gray and it occurs in northern Kentucky, southwest Ohio, and southeast Indiana, United States.

== Description ==
=== Depositional environment ===
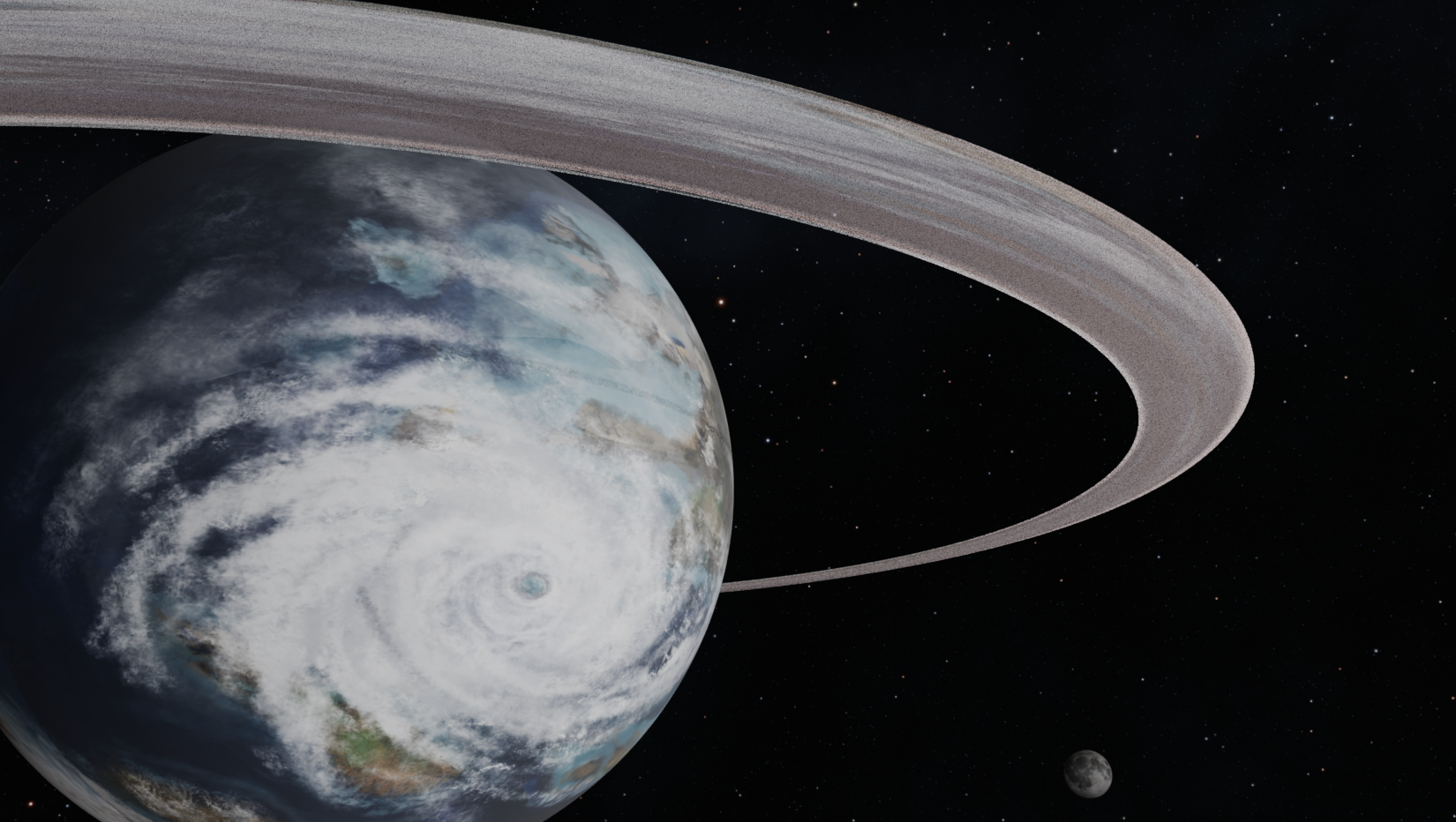
A digital reconstruction of a paleotempest depositing one of the dense limestone deposits of the Kope formation.

The depositional environment of the Kope Formation was a shallow marine inland sea off the coast of Southern Laurentia. The ancient Taconic Mountains to the south were subjected to erosion from ancient storms, which deposited mud into the Cincinnati basin. The densely packed limestones and shale are interpreted as tempestites.

Jennette and Pryor (1993) interpreted the Kope, along with the Bellevue and Fairview Formations, as a progradational succession on a carbonate ramp. The Kope is the most distal facies of the ramp complex.

=== Notable outcrops ===
The type section of the Grand Avenue Member is a cliff to the west of Grand Avenue in Cincinnati, Hamilton County, Ohio.

The type section of the Wesselman Tongue of the Kope Formation is an east-facing embankment on an unnamed creek that is followed by Wesselman Road in Miami Township, Hamilton County, Ohio. The embankment is 400 feet (120 m) south of Zion Hill bridge.

Kope Formation shale in a creek bed at Caldwell Nature Preserve, Cincinnati, 2026

=== Fossil content ===
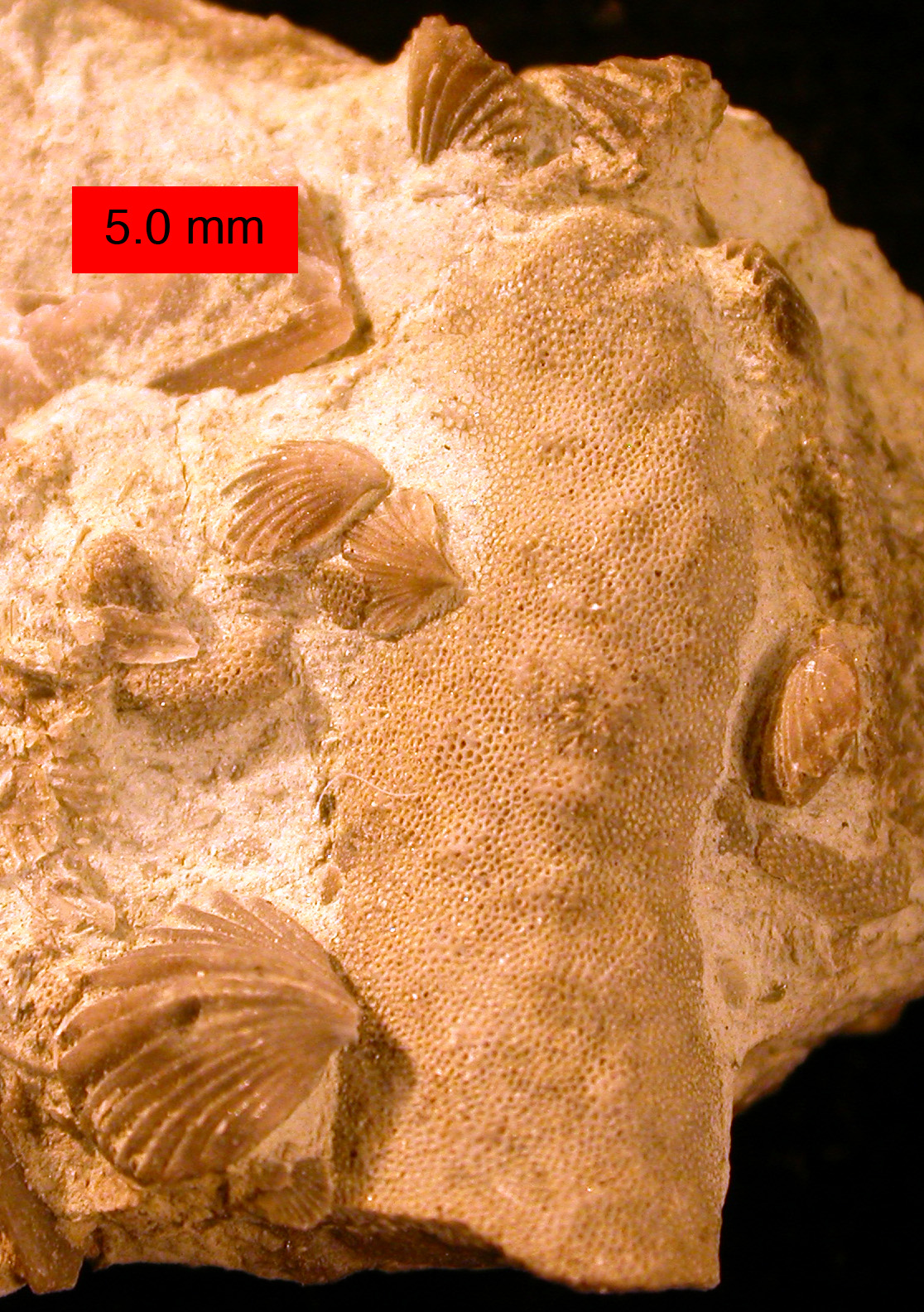
Zygospira modesta, atrypid brachiopods, preserved in their original positions on a trepostome bryozoan; from Cincinnatian Series (which includes Kope Formation), Indiana.

Brachiopods, trilobites, bryozoans, rugose corals, and echinoderms (including crinoids, asteroids, and edrioasteroids) are all present in the Kope. Due to their mid-continent depositional environment, the fossils are almost free of deformation caused by tectonic activity common in the Appalachian Mountains.

The brachiopods Dalmanella sp., Hebertella sp., Leptaena sp., Petrocrania sp., Philhedra sp., Platystrophia sp., Pseudolingula sp., Rafinesquina sp., Sowerbyella sp., Strophomena sp., Trematis sp., and Zygospira sp. have been recorded from the Cincinnatian Series, which includes the Kope Formation.

The trilobites such as Triarthrus eatoni, Cryptolithus tessellatus, and Proetidella parviusculus have been identified in the Kope, and the Ohio State Fossil, Isotelus maximus, can most likely be found in it.

The bryozoans Ceramophylla sp., Eridotrypa mutabilis, Peronopera vera, Batostoma jamesi, Dekayia aspera, Heterotrypa ulrichi, Parvohallopora sp., and Amplexopora septosa have been found in the Kope.

Among echinoderms, the crinoids Cincinnaticrinus varibrachialis, Ectenocrinus sp., and Iocrinus sp. are present in the Kope. Edrioasteroids and asteroids (starfish), generally rare, are common in overlying formations, and may be present in the Kope.

A very large and unusual fossil, informally named "Godzillus", was discovered in the Kope Formation of Kenton County, Kentucky in 2011 by amateur paleontologist Ron Fine, of the Cincinnati Dry Dredgers. The reassembled fossil had a roughly elliptical shape with multiple lobes totaling almost seven feet (2.1 m) in length and is believed by Fine to have been nine feet-tall (2.7 m) when upright. David L. Meyer, of the University of Cincinnati geology department, believed it to be a fossilized mat of algae. In 2016, Ron Fine, David L. Meyer, and two other scientists published a study implicating that the fossil might not be a new taxon and could instead have been a complex preservation of trilobites.

== Age ==
Relative age dating of the Kope places it in the Katian of the Ordovician period.
