= Kankakee Arch =

Geologic uplift in the Midwestern United States

The Kankakee Arch is a geologic arch with a northwest–southeast trending axis which connects the Cincinnati Arch to the southeast with the Wisconsin Dome to the northwest. It lies beneath northeastern Illinois, northern Indiana and southeastern Wisconsin. This structural ridge lies between the Illinois Basin to the southwest and the Michigan Basin to the northeast. The area of central Illinois began to depress by the late Ordovician. The Cincinnati Arch was developing across eastern Indiana during the late Ordovician. By the Early Silurian the seas northwest of the Cincinnati Arch began to become shallower. By the Early Mississippian, the Kankakee arch was above sea level.

During the Silurian Period (420 to 405 MYA) a shallow sea spread across Indiana. This sea deposited limestones along the southwest slope of the arch. Over the arch, the depth of the deposits diminish, thus layers 100 feet (30 m) northeast of the arch become only 10 feet (3.0 m) across the top of the arch.

As in the Silurian Period, the Devonian Period (438 to 408 MYA) witnessed a renewal of the shallow seas after a short period when the area was above sea level. Deposition resumed with related, but significantly different dolomites and limestones both north and south of the shallow area of the arch.
