= Michigan Basin =

Geologic basin centered on the Lower Peninsula of Michigan

Coordinates: 43°40′N 84°45′W

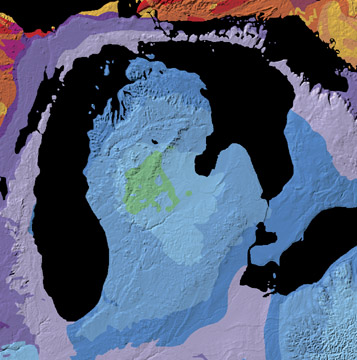
Geologic map of the Michigan Basin with the following geologic periods, from the center outwards: Jurassic Permian Mississippian Devonian Silurian Ordovician Cambrian

The Michigan Basin is a geologic basin centered on the Lower Peninsula of the U.S. state of Michigan. The feature is represented by a nearly circular pattern of geologic sedimentary strata in the area with a nearly uniform structural dip toward the center of the peninsula.

== Geology ==
The basin is centered in Gladwin County where the Precambrian basement rocks are 16,000 feet (4,900 m) deep. Around the margins, such as under Mackinaw City, Michigan, the Precambrian surface is around 4,000 feet (1,200 m) below the surface. This 4,000-foot (1,200 m) contour on the basement surface clips the northern part of the Lower Peninsula and continues under Lake Michigan along the west. It crosses the southern counties of Michigan and continues to the north beneath Lake Huron.

On the north in the Canadian Shield, which includes the western part of Michigan's Upper Peninsula, Precambrian rocks are exposed at the surface. The eastern margins of Wisconsin along Green Bay are along the margins of the basin, while Precambrian rocks crop out to the west in central Wisconsin. The northeastern margin of Illinois around Chicago is on the southwestern margin of the basin. The southeast-striking Kankakee Arch continuation of the Cincinnati Arch forms the southwest boundary of the basin underlying northeastern Illinois and northern Indiana. To the east, the Findlay Arch forms the southeast margin of the basin as it strikes to the northeast across northwestern Ohio, under the bed of Lake Erie and on as the Algonquin Arch through the southwestern prong of Ontario. The Wisconsin Arch forms the western boundary of the basin.

The rocks of the basin include Cambrian-Ordovician sandstones and carbonate rocks around the margins and at depth. Silurian-Devonian dolomites and limestones with Carboniferous (Mississippian and Pennsylvanian) strata are located basinward or above filling in the center. A veneer of Jurassic sediments is found in the center of the basin at the surface.

The basin appears to have subsided concurrently with sediment infilling. These sediments were found to be mainly shallow-water sediments, many of which are richly fossiliferous. The location was on a geologically passive portion of crust. The development of the basin and the surrounding arches were likely affected by the tectonic activity of the long-term Appalachian orogeny several hundred miles to the south and east.

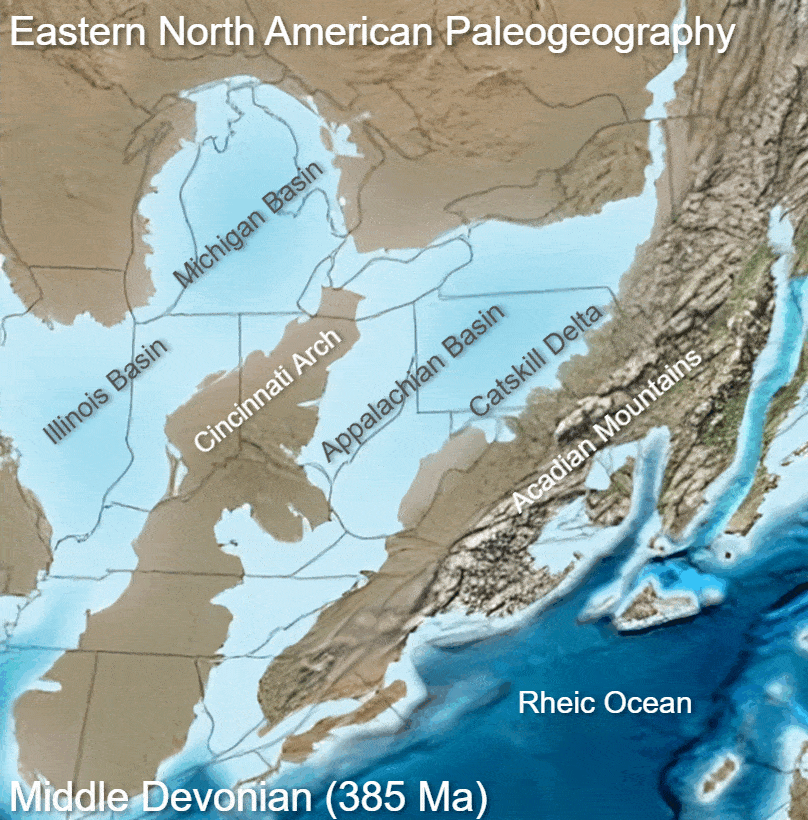
Paleogeographic reconstruction showing the Michigan Basin area during the Middle Devonian period.

Within the Precambrian rocks beneath and just west of the center of the basin lies a generally north to northwest trending linear feature that appears to be an ancient rift in the Earth's crust. This rift appears to be contiguous with the rift zone under Lake Superior. This, the Midcontinent Rift System, turns west under Lake Superior and then southwest through southern Minnesota, central and western Iowa and southeastern Nebraska and into eastern Kansas.

== Natural resources ==
Some minerals that have been mined from rocks in the basin include halite and gypsum. Halite (rock salt) occurs in beds of the Salina Formation (Silurian) and the Detroit River Group (Devonian). The Detroit salt mine has mined rock salt from beneath the Detroit metropolitan area since 1906. Brine recovered from wells in the Michigan basin has been used as a commercial source of potassium salts, bromine, iodine, calcium chloride, and magnesium salts.

Michigan Basin
- Country: United States
- Region: Northern Michigan
- Location: Northern Michigan
- Offshore/onshore: Onshore
- Operators: Chevron Corporation

Production
- Producing formations: Michigan Basin

=== Oil and gas ===
The rocks of the Michigan Basin are the source of commercial quantities of petroleum. The most actively drilled-for source of natural gas in recent years has been shale gas from the Devonian Antrim Shale in the northern part of the basin.

The Michigan basin extends into Ontario, Canada, where oil and gas regulators are studying its potential. It is considered to be one of "America's most promising oil and gas plays." In May 2010, a Michigan public land auction attracted the attention of the largest North American natural gas corporations, such as Encana (now Ovintiv) and Chesapeake Energy. From 2008 through 2010, Encana accumulated a "large land position" (250,000 net acres) in a shale gas play in Michigan's Middle Ordovician Collingwood shale. Encana focused activities in Cheboygan, Kalkaska, and Missaukee counties in Michigan's northern Lower Peninsula. Natural gas is produced from both Utica and Collingwood shale (called Utica Collingwood). Collingwood is a shaly limestone about 40 feet thick that lies just above the Ordovician Trenton formation. Utica shale overlies the Collingwood.
