= Blackiston Formation =

Geological formation in Indiana

- Stratigraphic range: Devonian
- Type: Formation

Location
- Region: Indiana
- Country: United States

The Blackiston Formation is a geologic formation in Indiana. It preserves fossils dating back to the Devonian period.

== See also ==
- List of fossiliferous stratigraphic units in Indiana
