= Saluda Formation =

Geologic formation in Ohio and Indiana

- Stratigraphic range: Late Ordovician
- Type: Formation
- Underlies: Whitewater Formation
- Overlies: Liberty Formation

Location
- Region: Ohio, Indiana
- Country: United States

The Saluda Formation is a geologic formation in Ohio and Indiana. It preserves fossils dating back to the Ordovician period.

== See also ==
- List of fossiliferous stratigraphic units in Ohio
- List of fossiliferous stratigraphic units in Indiana
