= Tanners Creek Formation =

Geological formation in Indiana

- Stratigraphic range: Ordovician
- Type: Formation

Location
- Region: Indiana
- Country: United States

The Tanners Creek Formation is a geologic formation in Indiana. It preserves fossils dating back to the Ordovician period.

The formation takes its name from Tanners Creek, a tributary of the Ohio River.

== See also ==
- List of fossiliferous stratigraphic units in Indiana
