= Detroit salt mine =

Salt mine in Michigan, United States

Coordinates: 42.2858°N 83.1497°W

The Detroit salt mine is a salt mine located 1,100 ft (340 m) below Detroit, Michigan. The mine opened in 1910 and covers 1,500 acres (610 ha) underground. In the beginning, the leather and food industries were the primary customers. Today, road deicing salt is the primary product.

== History ==
Rock salt was discovered in Detroit in 1895. The Detroit Salt and Manufacturing Company was formed to extract the salt. The company went bankrupt before finishing the shaft down to the salt. A new company was formed and the shaft was completed in 1910. A second larger shaft was completed in 1925. The first shaft was relegated to hauling workers and materials. By the late 1950s, the company operated through both shafts, which are about 1100 feet deep. The mine was closed from 1983 to 1998, when production was restarted to produce road deicing salt. In October 2010, the Detroit Salt Co., LLC, was acquired by the Kissner Group of Canada for an undisclosed price.

== See also ==
- Michigan Basin
