= Miamitown Shale =

Geologic formation in Ohio

Miamitown Formation
- Stratigraphic range: Late Ordovician
- Type: Formation
- Underlies: Grant Lake Formation
- Overlies: Fairview Formation

Location
- Region: Ohio
- Country: United States

The Miamitown Formation is a geologic formation in Ohio. It preserves fossils dating back to the Ordovician period.

== See also ==
- List of fossiliferous stratigraphic units in Ohio
