= Beech Creek Formation =

Geological formation in Indiana

- Stratigraphic range: Carboniferous
- Type: Formation
- Underlies: Fraileys Formation
- Overlies: Cypress Formation

Location
- Region: Illinois and Indiana
- Country: United States

The Beech Creek Formation is a geologic formation in Indiana. It preserves fossils dating back to the Carboniferous period.

== See also ==
- List of fossiliferous stratigraphic units in Indiana
