= Spoon Formation =

Geologic formation in Indiana

- Stratigraphic range: Carboniferous
- Type: Formation

Location
- Region: Indiana
- Country: United States

The Spoon Formation is a geologic formation in Indiana. It preserves fossils dating back to the Carboniferous period.

== See also ==
- List of fossiliferous stratigraphic units in Indiana
