= Bull Fork Formation =

Geologic formation in Ohio and Kentucky, United States

- Stratigraphic range: Ordovician
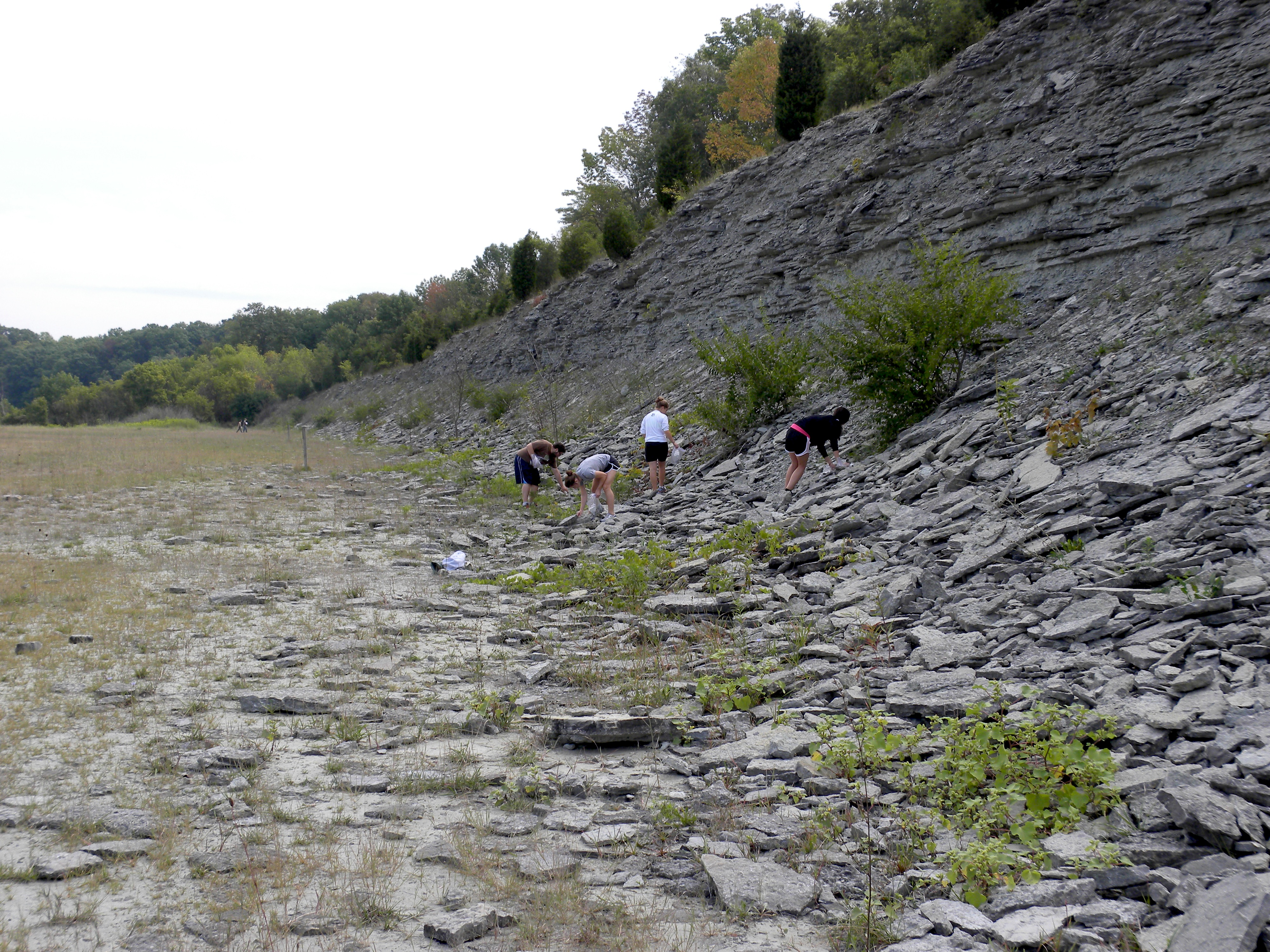
- Bull Fork Formation exposed in southern Ohio
- Type: Formation
- Underlies: Drakes Formation
- Overlies: Grant Lake Formation

Lithology
- Primary: Limestone
- Other: Shale

Location
- Region: Ohio and Kentucky
- Country: United States

The Bull Fork Formation is a geologic formation in north central Kentucky and southwestern Ohio. It preserves fossils dating back to the Ordovician period.

John H. Peck assigned strata previously called the Arnheim, Waynesville, Liberty, and Whitewater Formations in Kentucky to the Bull Fork Formation.

== See also ==
- List of fossiliferous stratigraphic units in Ohio
