= Sellersburg Group =

Geologic group in Kentucky

- Stratigraphic range: Devonian
- Type: Group

Location
- Region: Kentucky
- Country: United States

The Sellersburg Group is a geologic group in Kentucky. It preserves fossils dating back to the Devonian period.

== See also ==
- List of fossiliferous stratigraphic units in Kentucky
