= Dillsboro Formation =

Geologic formation in Ohio, United States

- Stratigraphic range: Ordovician
- Type: Formation
- Unit of: Maquoketa Group
- Underlies: Fort Atkinson Limestone and Whitewater Formation
- Overlies: Kope Formation

Location
- Region: Indiana, Ohio
- Country: United States

The Dillsboro Formation is a geologic formation in Ohio. It preserves fossils dating back to the Ordovician period.

== See also ==
- List of fossiliferous stratigraphic units in Ohio
