= Raccoon Creek Group =

Geologic group in Illinois, Indiana, and Kentucky

- Stratigraphic range: Carboniferous
- Type: Group
- Sub-units: Brazil Formation; Caseyville Formation; Mansfield Formation; Tradewater Formation; Staunton Formation

Location
- Region: Indiana
- Country: United States

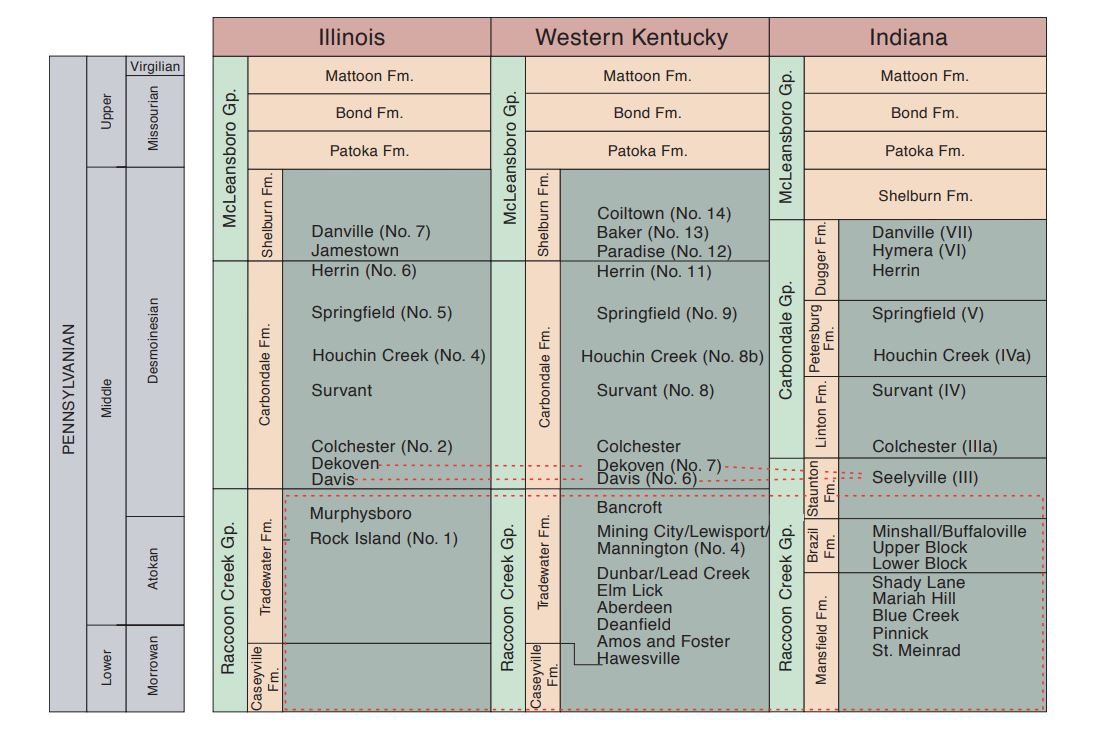
Illinois Basin Pennsylvanian stratigraphy

The Raccoon Creek Group is a geologic group in Indiana. It preserves fossils dating back to the Carboniferous period.

== Stratigraphy ==
=== Brazil Formation ===
The Brazil Formation is a geologic formation in Indiana consisting of shale, sandstone, clay, and coal. It preserves fossils dating back to the Carboniferous period

==== Description ====
The Brazil Formation was named in 1902 for the city of Brazil, located in Clay County, Indiana. It originally included rocks between the bottom of the Petersburg Coal and the top of the Mansfield Sandstone. In 1922, a new survey resulted in restrictions to include only rocks between the Lower Block Coal Member and what was at the time called Coal II. In 1976, it was amended again to include rocks between the upper part of Minshall Coal Member and the lower part of Lower Block Coal Member.

The formation is made up of shale, sandstone, clay, and coal. Thickness is measured between 40 and 90 feet.

=== Caseyville Formation ===
The Caseyville Formation is a geologic formation in Kentucky. It preserves fossils dating back to the Carboniferous period.

=== Mansfield Formation ===
The Mansfield Formation is a geologic formation in Indiana. It preserves fossils dating back to the Carboniferous period.

=== Tradewater Formation ===
The Tradewater Formation is a geologic formation in Kentucky. It preserves fossils dating back to the Carboniferous period .

=== Staunton Formation ===
The Staunton Formation is a geologic formation in Indiana consisting of sandstone, shale, and coalbeds.

==== Description ====
The formation was named by E. R. Cumings to refer to the exposed rocks found near Staunton, Clay County. Later surveys resulted in the inclusion of the Perth Limestone Member into the Staunton Formation, having previously belonged to the Brazil Formation.

The Staunton Formation is made up of sandstone and shale (75 to 150 feet), and coalbeds (up to 8).
