= Lampasas Group =

- Stratigraphic range: Carboniferous
- Type: Group

Location
- Region: Indiana
- Country: United States

The Lampasas Group is a geologic group in Indiana. It preserves fossils dating back to the Carboniferous period.

== See also ==
- List of fossiliferous stratigraphic units in Indiana
