= Illinois Basin =

American Paleozoic depositional and structural basin

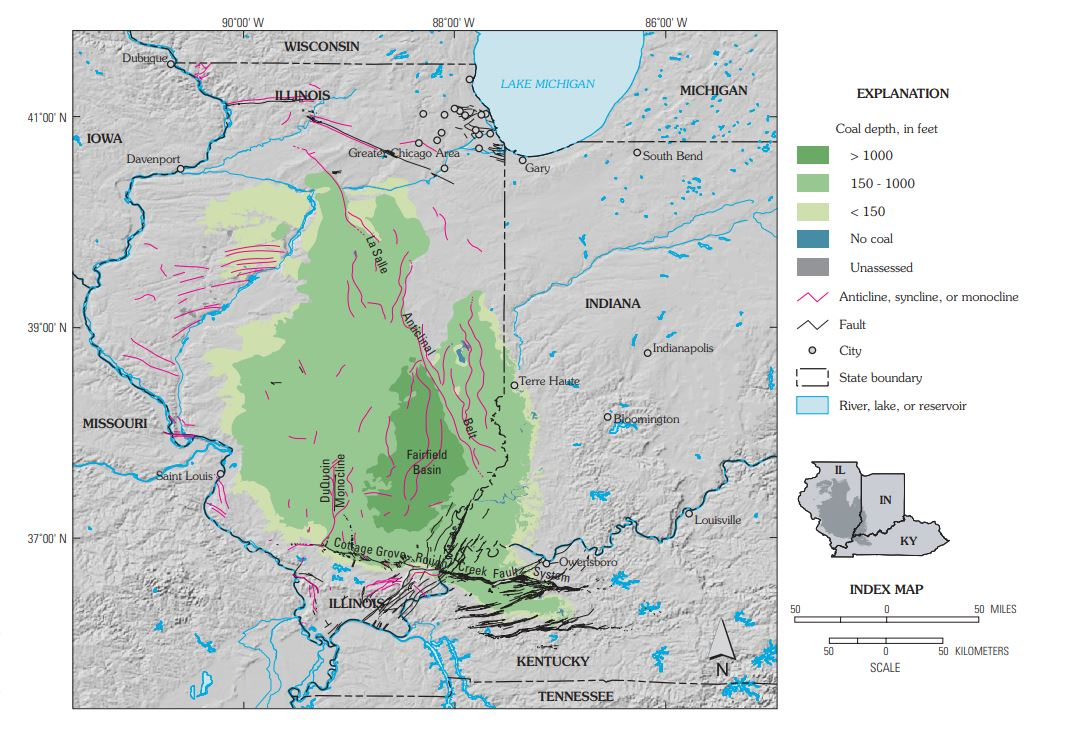
- Basin structure map

- Location within the United States Location within Illinois

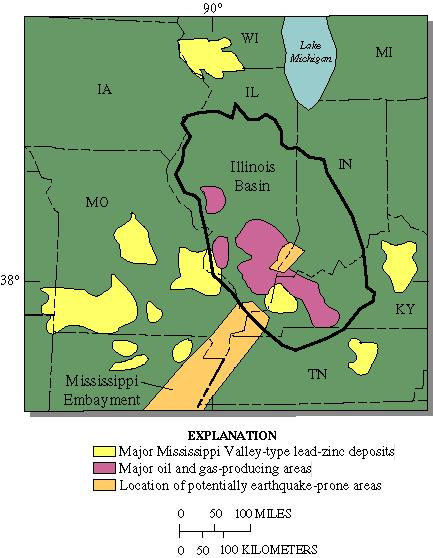
- Location of the Illinois Basin (USGS)

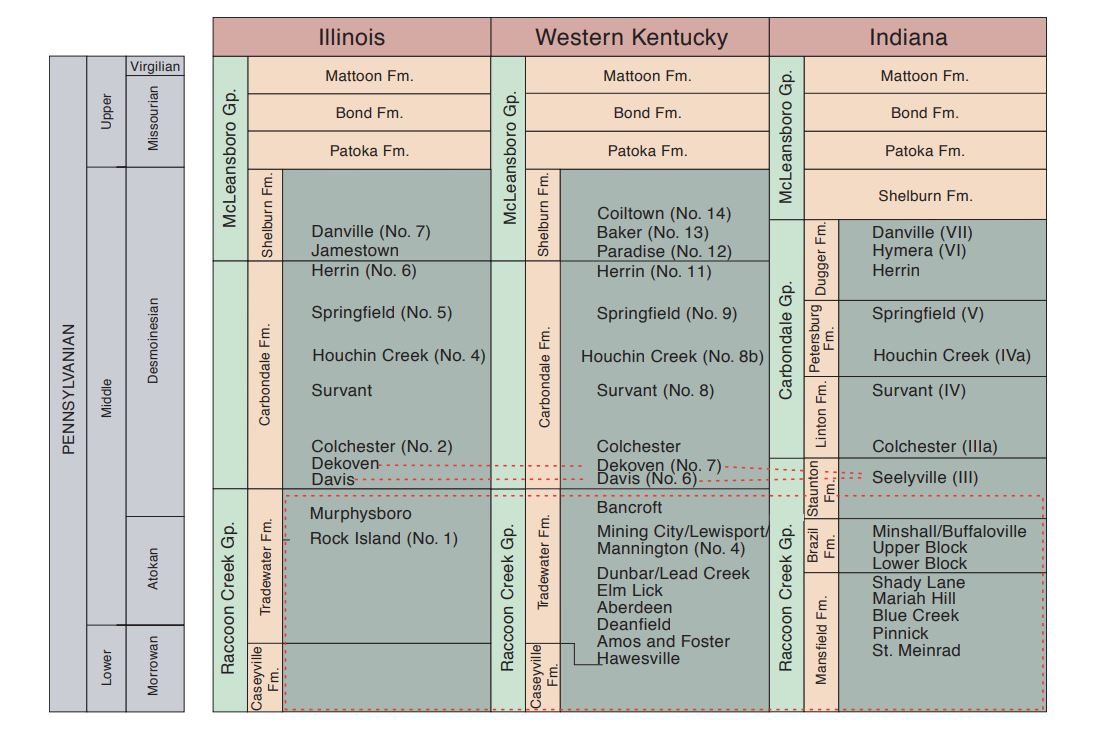
- Pennsylvanian stratigraphy

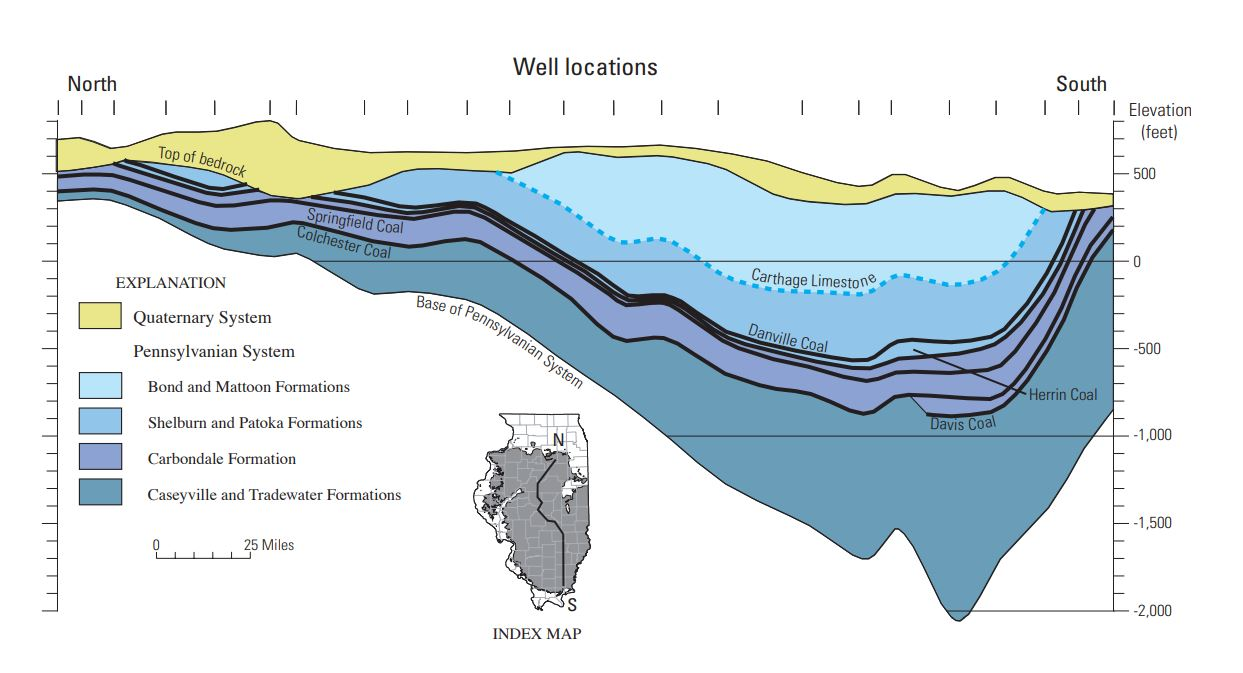
- Illinois Basin cross-section
- Coordinates: 39°45′00″N 89°30′00″W
- Etymology: Illinois
- Country: United States
- States: Illinois, SW Indiana, W Kentucky

Characteristics
- On/Offshore: Onshore
- Boundaries: Kankakee Arch (NE), Cincinnati Arch (SE); Pascola Arch (S), Ozark Dome (SW); Mississippi River Arch (NW), Wisconsin Arch (N)
- Area: 80,000 sq mi (210,000 km^{2})

Geology
- Plate: North American Plate
- Age: Cambrian-Pennsylvanian
- Stratigraphy: Stratigraphy
- Faults: New Madrid seismic zone, Wabash Valley seismic zone
- Field: Coal fields

The Illinois Basin is a Paleozoic depositional and structural basin in the United States, centered in and underlying most of the state of Illinois, and extending into southwestern Indiana and western Kentucky. The basin is elongate, extending approximately 400 miles (640 km) northwest-southeast, and 200 miles (320 km) southwest-northeast.

== Boundaries and sedimentary rocks ==
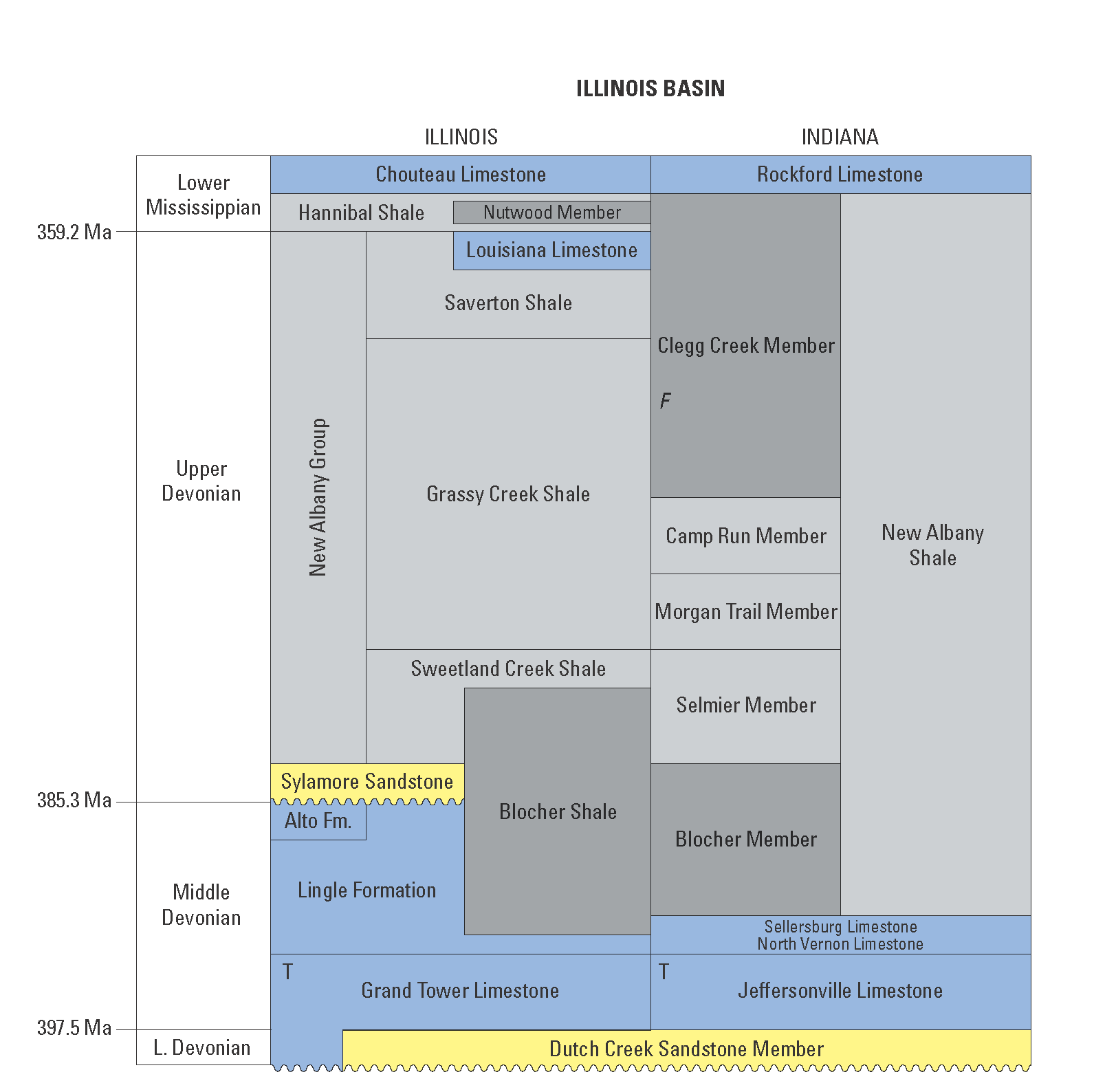
Devonian stratigraphic column

The basin is bordered on the northeast by the Kankakee Arch, on the southeast by the Cincinnati Arch, on the south by the Pascola Arch, on the southwest by the Ozark Dome, on the northwest by the Mississippi River Arch, and on the north by the Wisconsin Arch. The New Madrid seismic zone and the Wabash Valley seismic zone intersect the southern portion of the basin.

The major structural features within the basin include the La Salle anticlinal belt, the DuQuoin monocline, the Cottage Grove fault system, and the Fairfield Basin.

At its center beneath southern Illinois, the basin contains a thickness of about 15,000 feet of Cambrian through Pennsylvanian sedimentary rocks, predominantly marine, and mostly dolomite, limestone, shale, and sandstone.

The basement rocks deep below the sedimentary rocks of the basin are Proterozoic granites and rhyolite of the Eastern Granite–Rhyolite Province which dates to around 1.55 Ga.

== Mineral resources ==
The rocks of the Illinois Basin are sources of coal, petroleum, and other minerals.

=== Coal ===
Bituminous coal is present in Pennsylvanian rocks in the basin, deposited in freshwater swamp environments. Over the years, the Illinois Basin has produced more than eight billion tons of coal in Southern Illinois, particularly in the Harrisburg Coal Field, and the Western Coal Fields of Kentucky. Coal production was 99 million short tons in 2008, roughly equally divided between Illinois, Indiana, and western Kentucky. The basin provided 8% of US coal production in 2008.

=== Petroleum ===
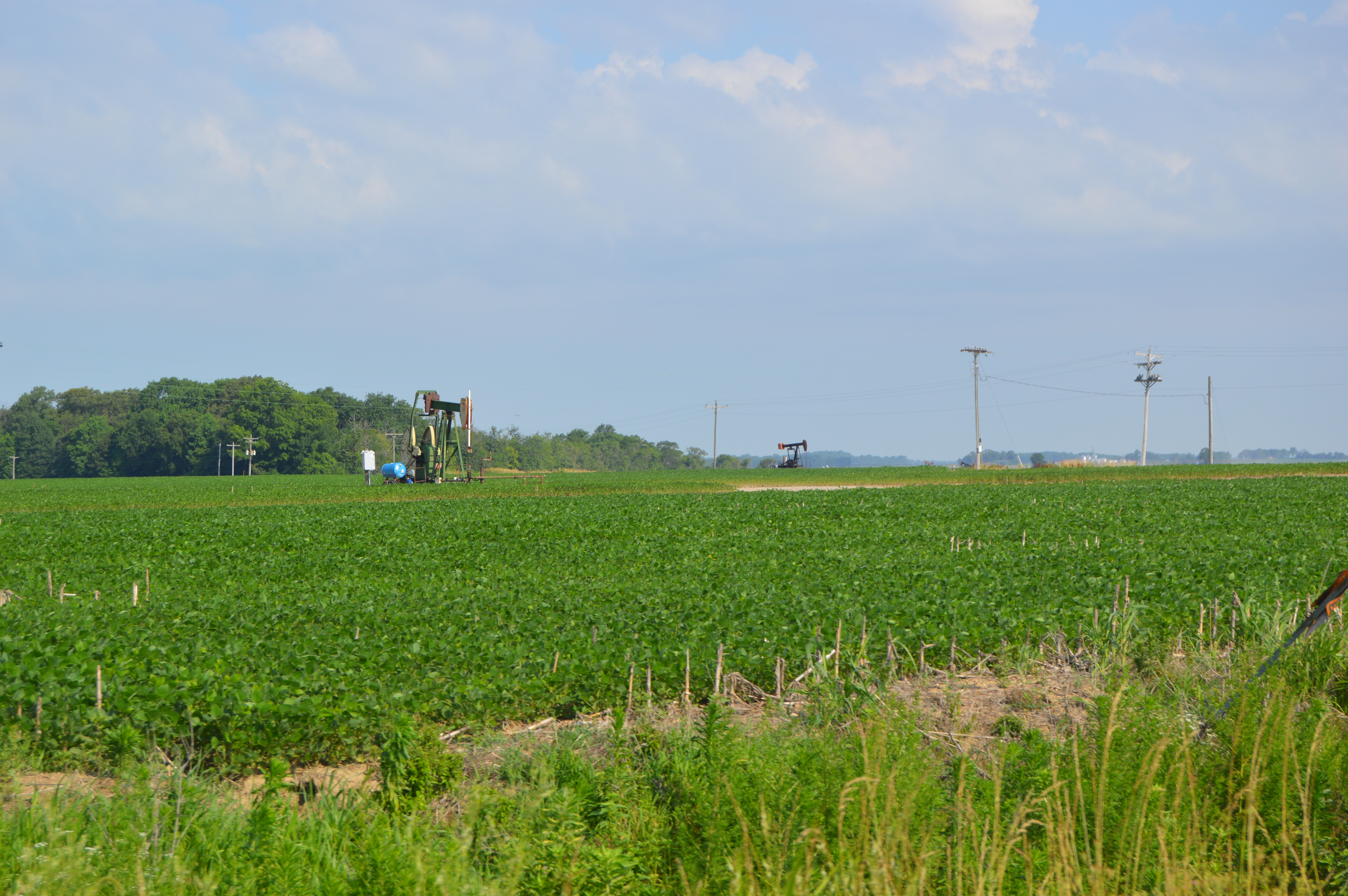
Pumpjacks operating in White County, Illinois

The Illinois Basin has produced more than four billion barrels of petroleum. Major oil production began in 1905, and from 1907 through 1912, the basin was the third-most oil productive area in the United States. Oil production peaked in 1908 at 34 million barrels per year, and declined steadily to 5 million barrels in 1933. A new wave of exploration brought oil production to a new high of 140 million barrels in 1940, after which production again declined. Waterflooding of old reservoirs caused a third peak of oil production in the 1950s.

Much recent drilling activity has targeted shale gas in the Devonian-Mississippian New Albany Shale.

=== Non-fuel minerals ===
The rocks of the Illinois Basin are thought to be the source of metals in Mississippi Valley-Type lead-zinc deposits, both within the basin and in surrounding areas, such as the Lead Belt of southeast Missouri.

Within the basin, deposits valuable for lead, zinc, coal balls and fluorite are mined in Hardin and Pope counties, Illinois, and Crittenden and Livingston counties, Kentucky. the deposits are in the form of veins and limestone replacement deposits in Mississippian sedimentary rocks. Ore minerals are fluorite, galena, and sphalerite. Gangue minerals include common quartz and calcite, and minor barite and chalcopyrite.

== Carbon sequestration ==
Some geologic formations in the Illinois Basin are considered to have potential for carbon sequestration, as a permanent disposal site for carbon dioxide that would otherwise be released into the atmosphere. In 2009, Archer Daniels Midland Corp. began pilot testing the carbon sequestration potential of the Mt. Simon formation beneath its ethanol manufacturing facility in Illinois. As of January 2015, one million metric tons of carbon dioxide had been sequestered in the Illinois Basin-Decatur Project.
