= Bellevue Formation =

Geologic formation in Ohio and Kentucky

- Stratigraphic range: Ordovician
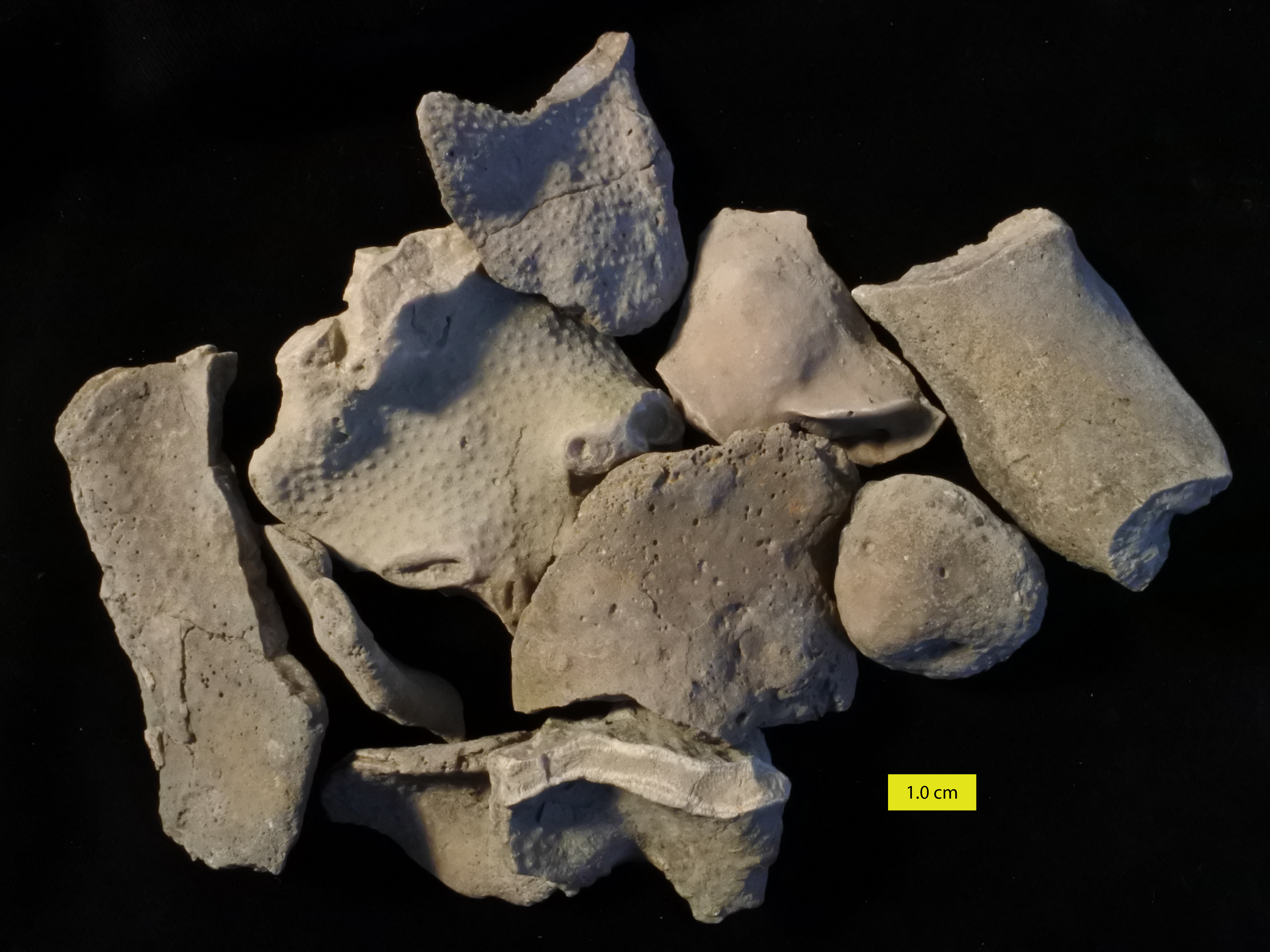
- Trepostome bryozoans from the Bellevue Formation in northern Kentucky.
- Type: Formation

Location
- Region: Ohio Kentucky
- Country: United States

The Bellevue Formation is a geologic formation in Ohio and Kentucky. It preserves fossils dating back to the Ordovician period.

== See also ==
- List of fossiliferous stratigraphic units in Ohio
- List of fossiliferous stratigraphic units in Kentucky
