= Arnheim Formation =

Geologic formation in Ohio

- Stratigraphic range: Katian
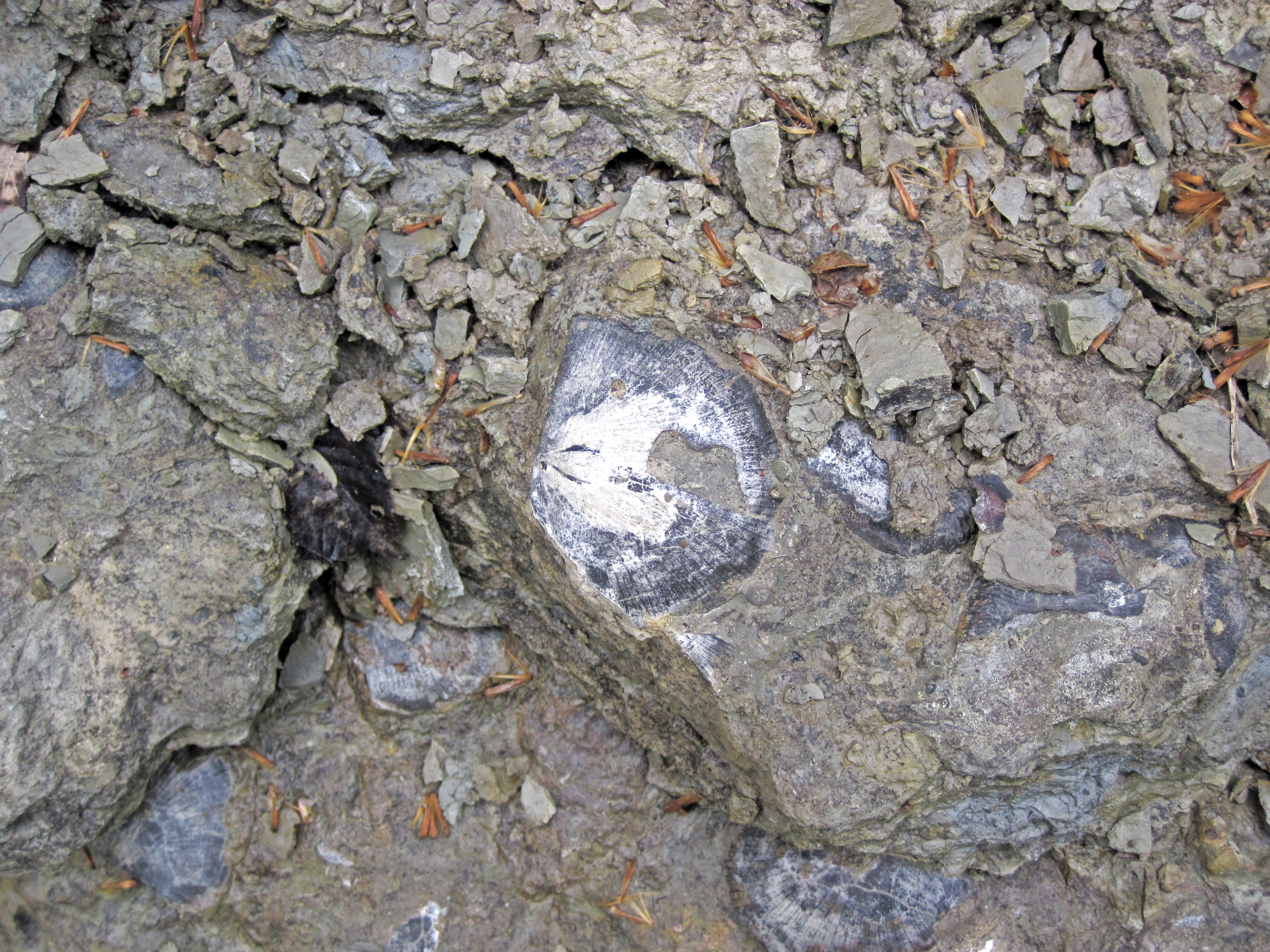
- Fossil brachiopod from the Arnheim Formation in Ohio
- Type: Formation
- Underlies: Waynesville Formation
- Overlies: Grant Lake Formation

Lithology
- Primary: limestone
- Other: shale

Location
- Region: Ohio
- Country: United States

The Arnheim Formation is a geologic formation in Ohio. It preserves fossils dating back to the Ordovician period.

== See also ==
- List of fossiliferous stratigraphic units in Ohio
