= Grant Lake Formation =

Geologic formation in Ohio and Kentucky

- Stratigraphic range: Late Ordovician
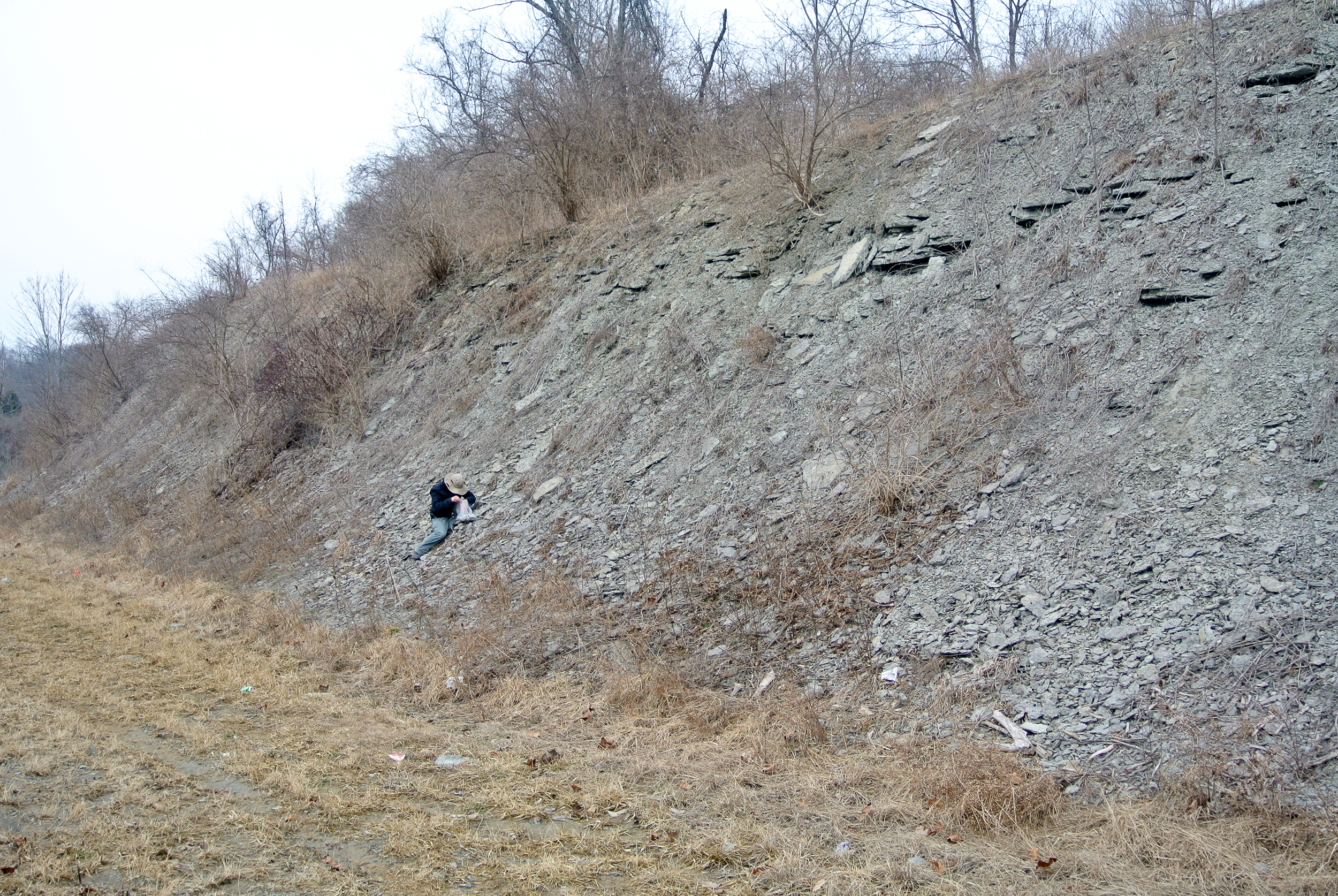
- Grant Lake Formation exposed in Boone County, Kentucky.
- Type: Formation
- Underlies: Arnheim Formation and Bull Fork Formation
- Overlies: Fairview Formation

Location
- Region: Ohio, Kentucky
- Country: United States

The Grant Lake Formation is a geologic formation in Ohio and Kentucky. It preserves fossils dating back to the Ordovician period.

== See also ==
- List of fossiliferous stratigraphic units in Ohio
- List of fossiliferous stratigraphic units in Kentucky
