= Fairview Formation =

Geologic formation in Ohio

- Stratigraphic range: Katian
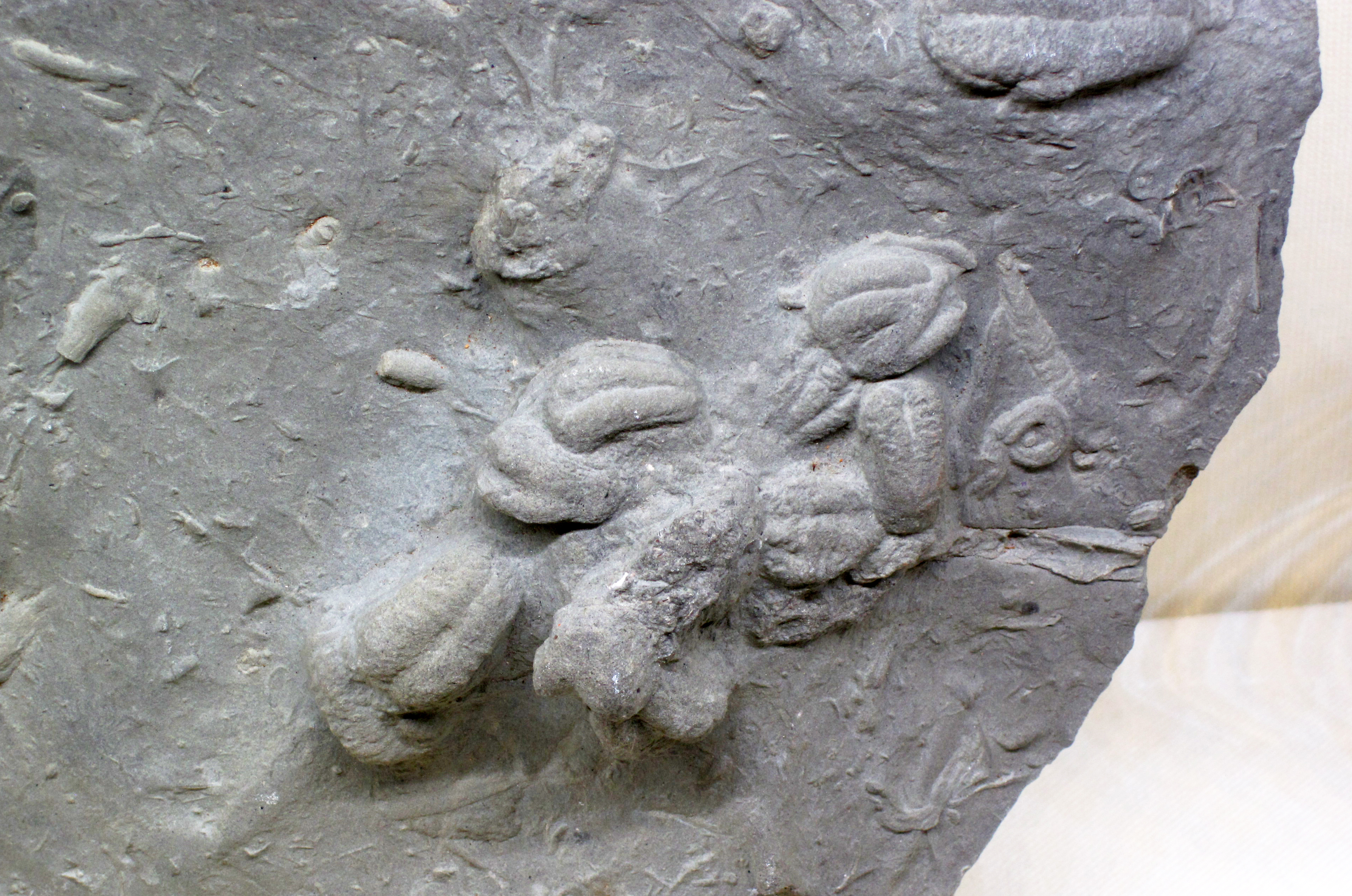
- Fossils from the Fairview Formation, Hamilton County, Ohio
- Type: Formation
- Underlies: Grant Lake Formation and Miamitown Shale
- Overlies: Kope Formation

Location
- Region: Ohio, Indiana, Kentucky
- Country: United States

The Fairview Formation is a geologic formation in Ohio. It preserves fossils dating back to the Late Ordovician period.

== See also ==
- List of fossiliferous stratigraphic units in Ohio
