= Cincinnati Group =

Geologic group in Kentucky and Ohio, United States

- Stratigraphic range: Late Ordovician
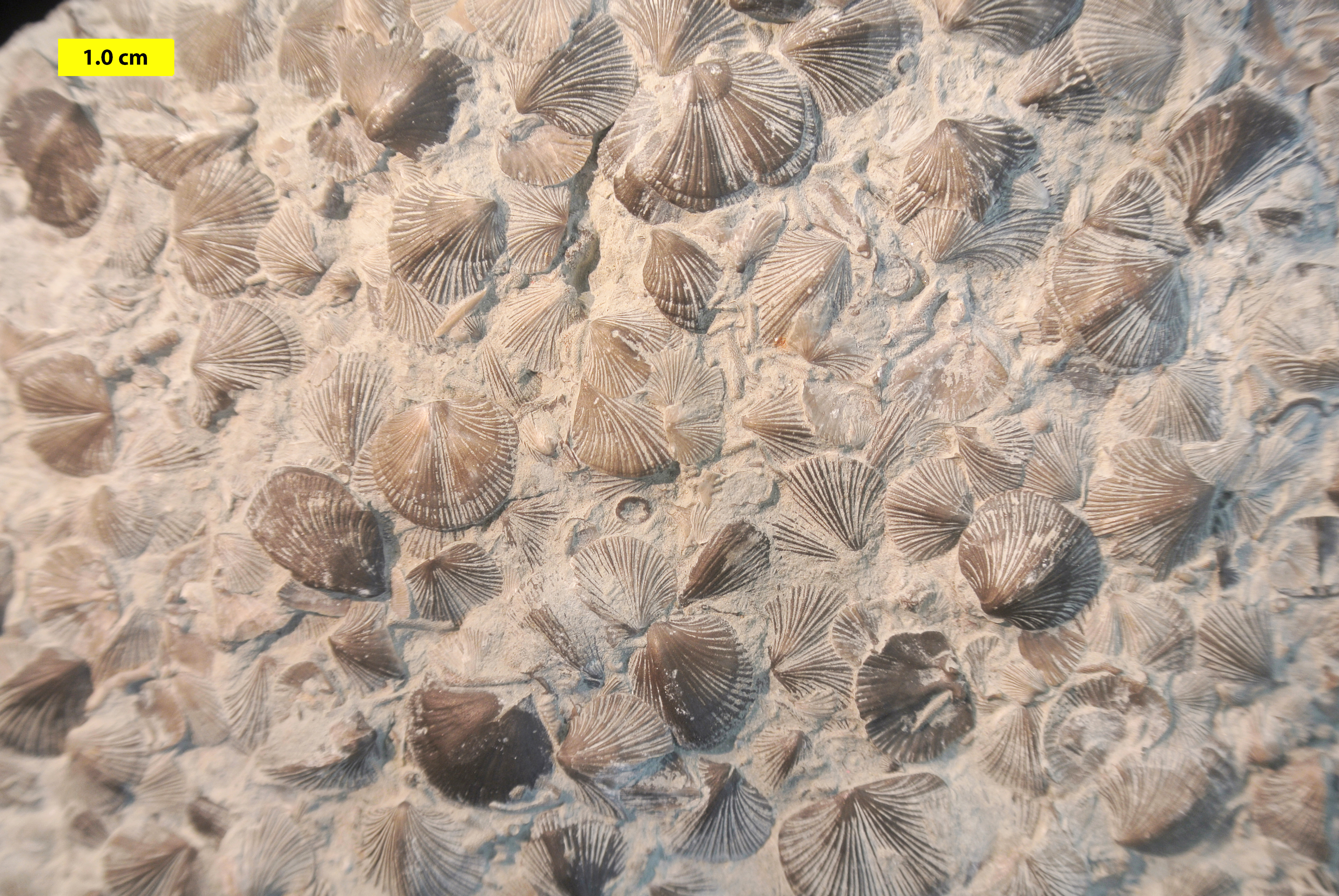
- Brachiopod-rich Cincinnatian limestone (Waynesville/Bull Fork Formation, Ohio)
- Type: Group
- Sub-units: Drakes Formation, Preachersville Member, Whitewater Formation, Liberty Formation, Waynesville Formation, Arnheim Formation, Grant Lake Limestone, Bellevue Member, Corryville Member, Mount Auburn Member, and Straight Creek Member, Miamitown Shale, Fairview Formation, Kope Formation, Clays Ferry Formation Point Pleasant Tongue
- Underlies: Cataract Group
- Overlies: Trenton Group

Location
- Region: Kentucky, Ohio, Indiana
- Country: United States

The Cincinnati Group is a geologic group in Kentucky, Ohio and Indiana. It is Upper Ordovician in age. This geologic group is made up of member formations: Drakes Formation, Whitewater Formation, Liberty Formation, Arnheim Formation, Grant Lake Limestone, Miamitown Shale, Fairview Formation, and Kope Formation. There are also several members of the respective formations. Most of these formations are highly fossiliferous.

== Stratigraphy ==
=== Drakes Formation ===
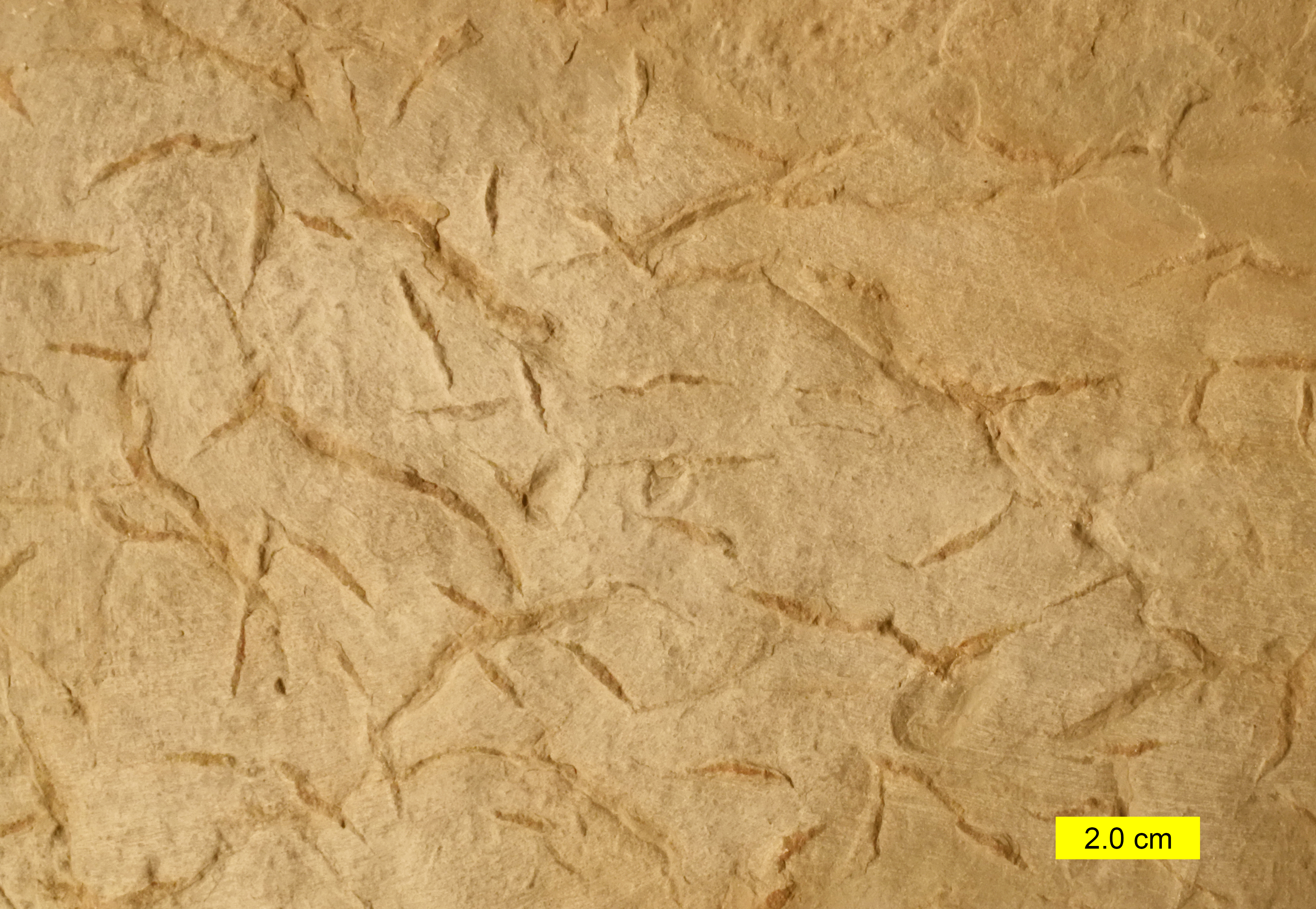
Syneresis Cracks, Drakes Formation in Ohio

The Drakes Formation is a geologic formation in Kentucky. It preserves fossils dating back to the Ordovician period.

The Drakes Formation was named by Weir for outcrops near the East Fork of Drakes Creek in the Paint Lick quadrangle, southwestern east-central Kentucky. This formation ranges from 20 ft to 150 ft thick, thinning northward. It includes four members, Saluda Dolomite Member, Preachersville Member, Rowland Member and Bardstown Member. These formations are made up of interbedded limestone and shale with units of dolomite ranging from a few inches to a few feet think.

=== Whitewater Formation ===
The Whitewater Formation is a geologic formation in Ohio and Indiana. It preserves fossils dating back to the Ordovician Period.

The Whitewater was first named by J. M. Nickles in 1903. He described exposures of limestone and interbedded calcareous shale along the Whitewater River at Richmond, Wayne County, Indiana.

An excellent exposure of the Whitewater Formation is a roadcut located on Route 27 south of Richmond, Indiana, at 39.7877 N, -84.9014 W. It is typically called "Richmond South" in field guides and other publications.

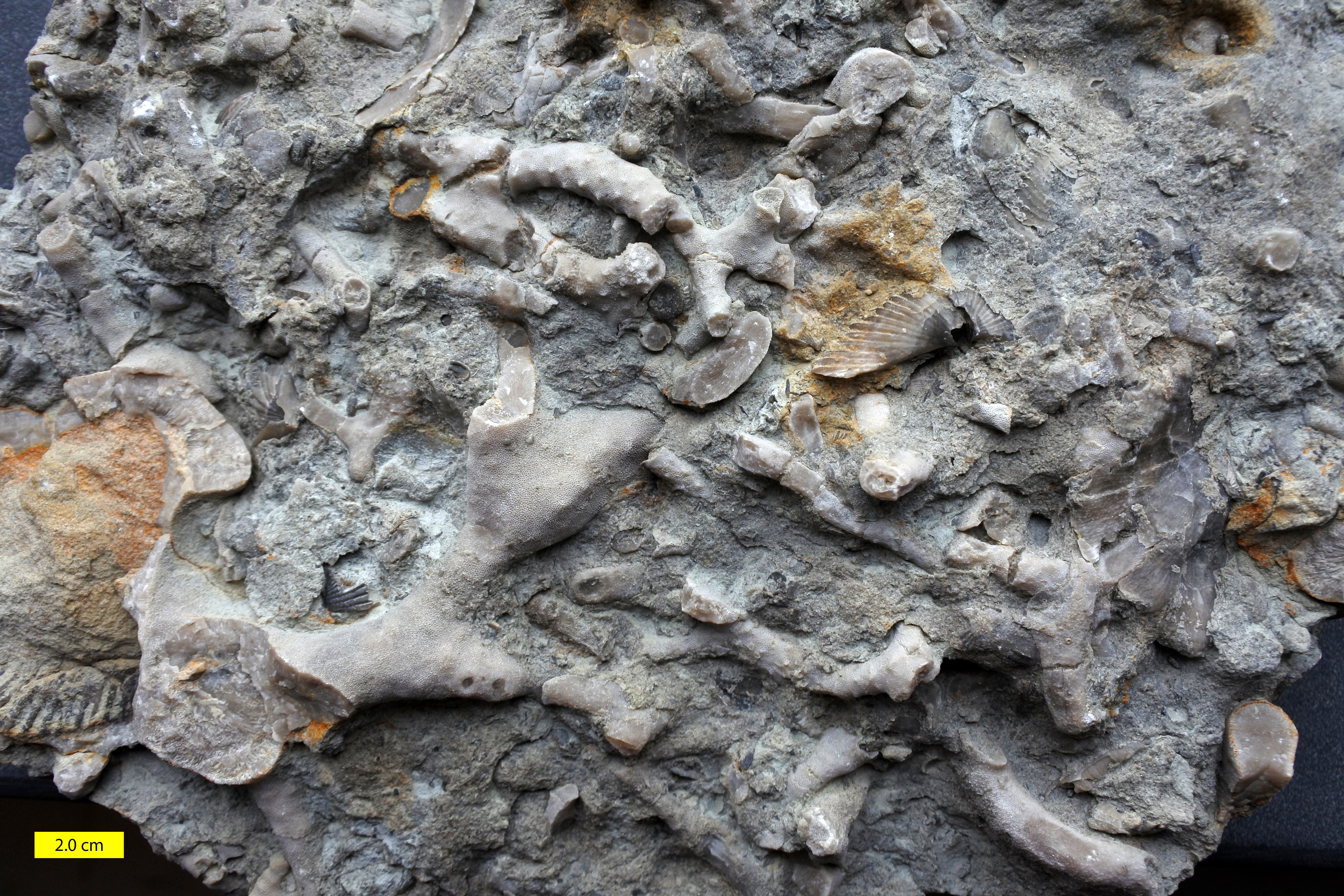
Fossiliferous slab

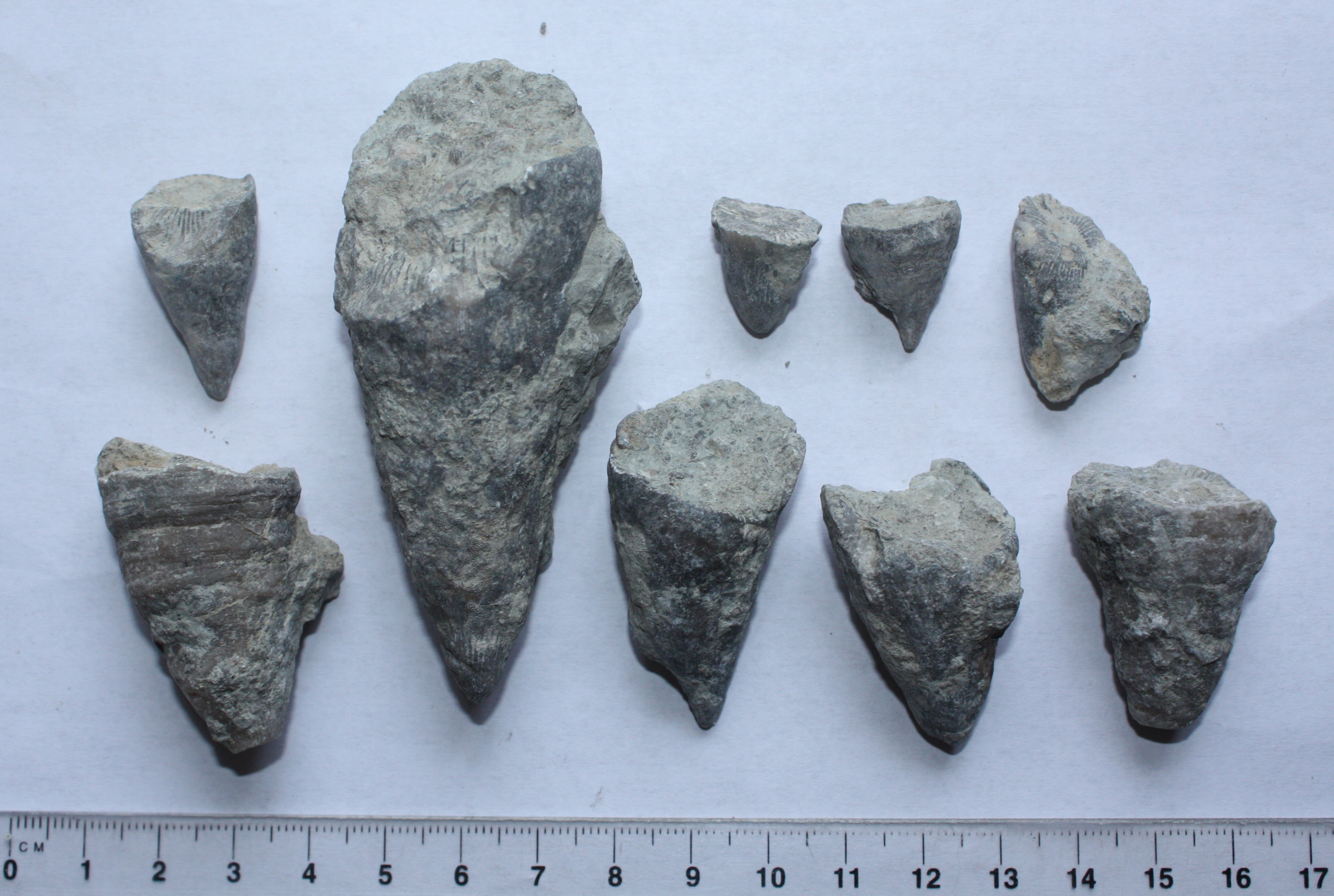
Rugosa corals

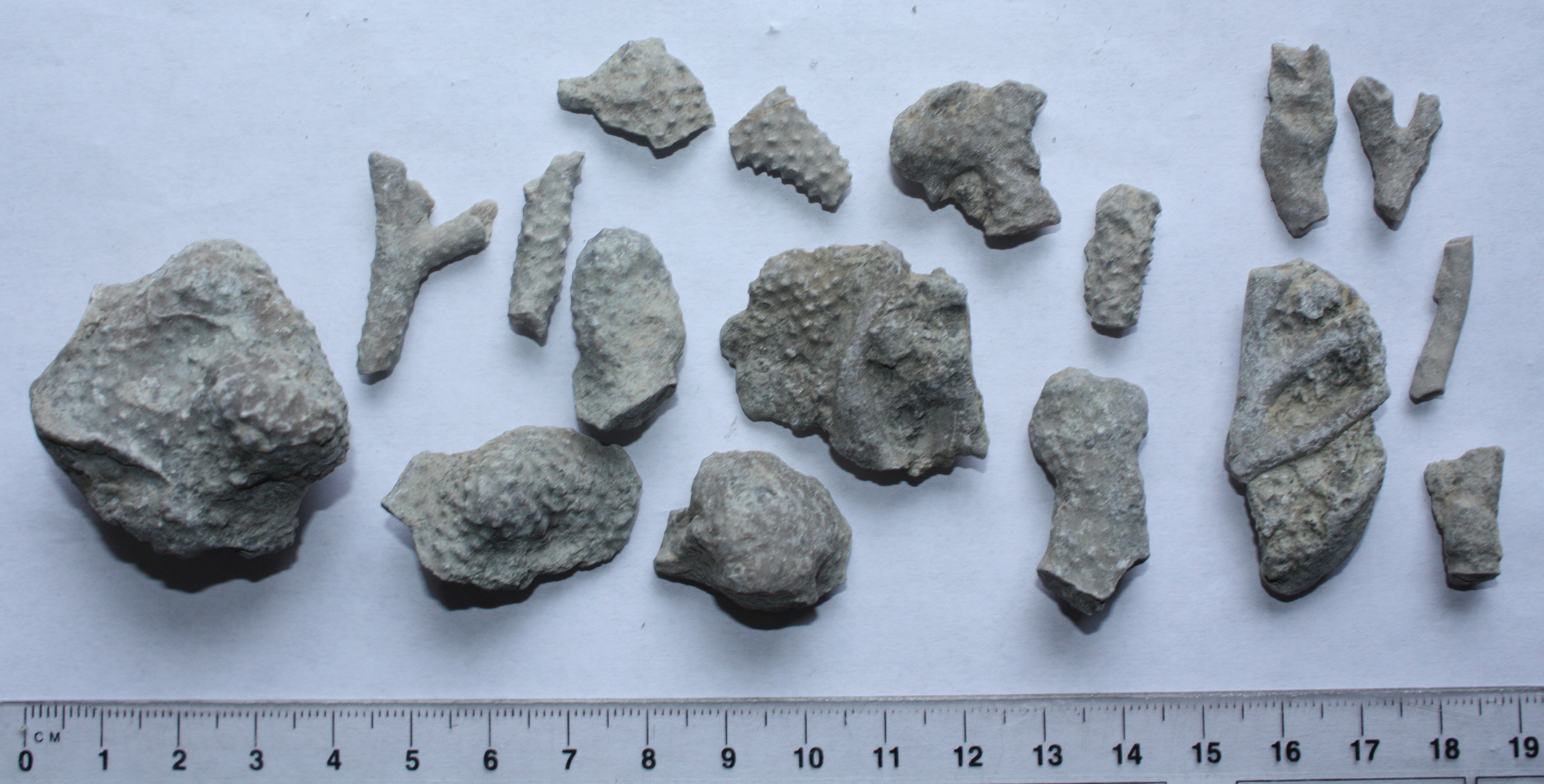
Bryozoa

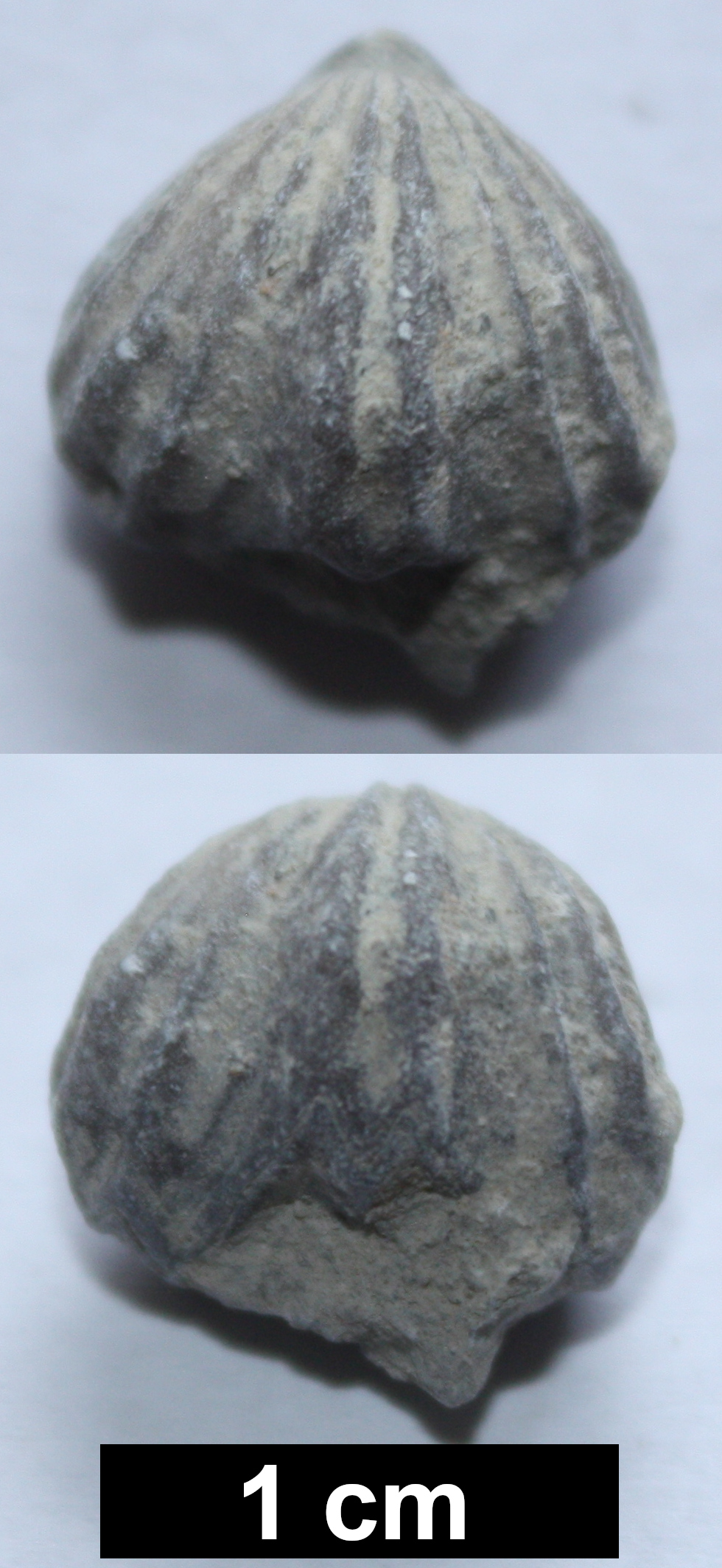
Small brachiopod

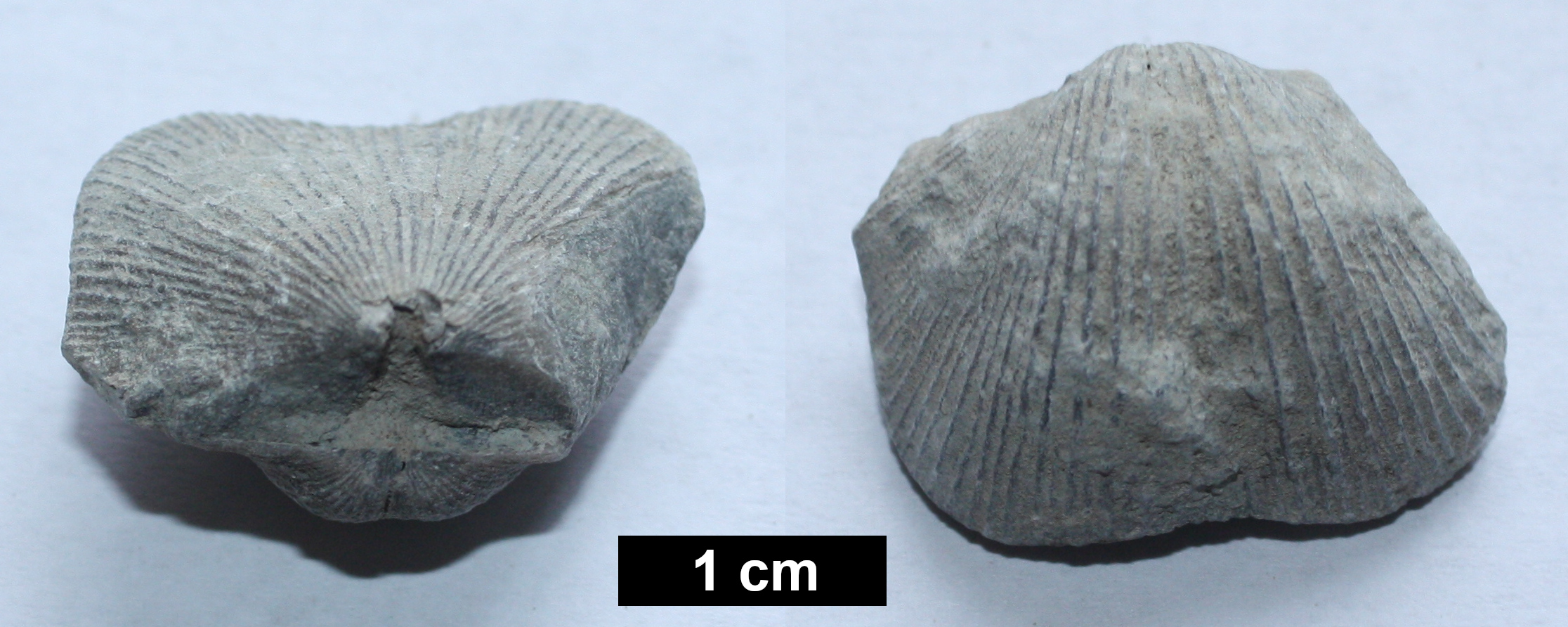
Another brachiopod

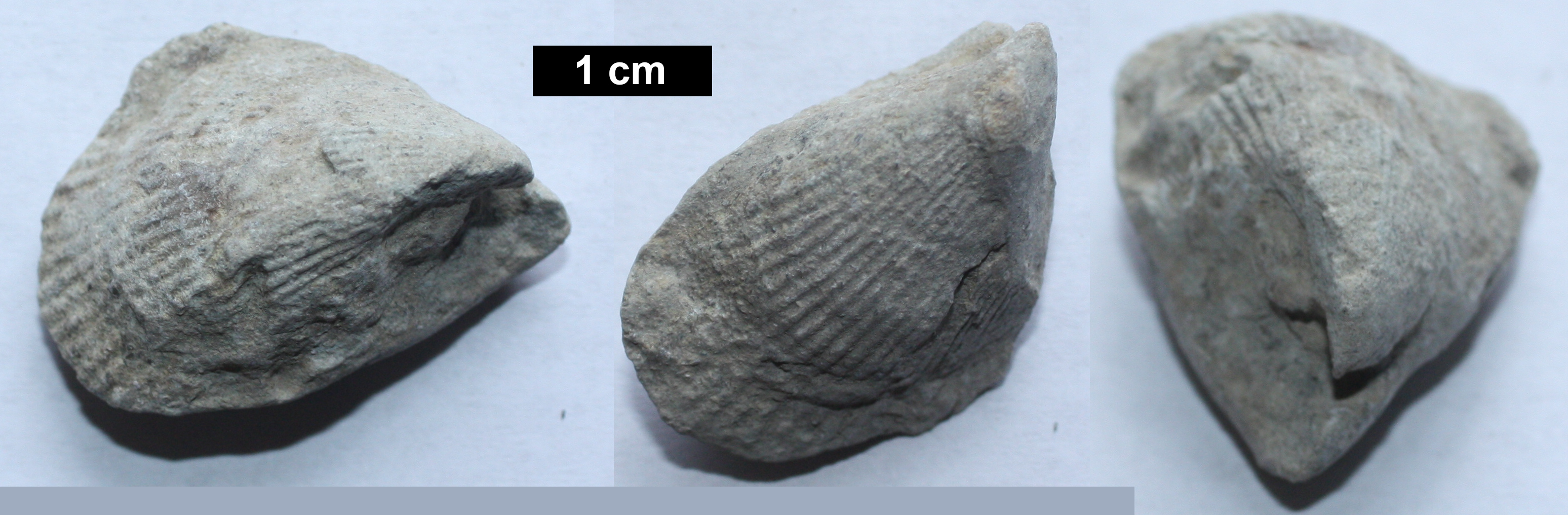
Bivalve

=== Liberty Formation ===
The Liberty Formation is a geologic formation in Ohio and Indiana. It preserves fossils dating back to the Ordovician Period.

=== Waynesville Formation ===
The Waynesville Formation is a geologic formation in Ohio and Indiana. It preserves fossils from the Late Ordovician Period.

== Paleofauna ==
The Cincinnati Group Has produced many fossil animals. The stratigraphy of the Cincinnati Group is complex and the different constituents unit(Elkhorn,Liberty,Saluda,and Whitewater Formations) Are interpreted as being a complex and coeval system of laterally equivalent environments.

=== Cephalopoda ===
Cephalopods of the Cincinnati Group
Genus	Species	Material	Notes
Narthecoceras	N.dunni	Shells	A large 3 m Orthoconic nautiloid.
Endoceras	E.proteiforme	Shells	A gigantic orthoconic nautiloid,at least 4.6 m.
Lambeoceras	L.richmondese	Shells	A moderately large nautiloid 1 m shell length.
Treptoceras	T.sp.	Shells	A small 20 cm nautiloid.
Nautiloid indet.	Indet	Shells	Numerous indeterminate nautiloids.

=== Arthropoda ===
Arthropods of the Cincinnati Group
Genus	Species	Material	Notes
Isotelus	I.maximus	Numerous specimens	Giant 50 cm trilobite.
Megalograptus	M.ohioensis	Holotype specimen	Large 80 cm eurypterid.

== See also ==
- List of fossiliferous stratigraphic units in Kentucky
- List of fossiliferous stratigraphic units in Ohio
- List of fossiliferous stratigraphic units in Indiana
