= List of fossiliferous stratigraphic units in Kentucky =

This article contains a list of fossil-bearing stratigraphic units in the state of Kentucky, U.S.

== Sites ==
Group or Formation	Period	Notes
Alvy Creek Formation	Carboniferous	
Arnheim Formation	Ordovician	
Ashlock Formation	Ordovician	
Bardstown Formation	Ordovician	
Beechwood Limestone	Devonian	
Bellevue Formation	Ordovician	
Benbolt Formation	Ordovician	
Borden Formation	Carboniferous	
Brassfield Formation	Silurian	
Breathitt Formation	Pennsylvanian	
Bull Fork Formation	Ordovician	
Calloway Creek Formation	Ordovician	
Caseyville Formation	Carboniferous	
Chattanooga Shale	Devonian	
Chester Series	Carboniferous	
Claiborne Formation	Paleogene	
Clays Ferry Formation	Ordovician	
Copland Coal	Carboniferous	
Corniferous Formation	Devonian	
Corryville Formation	Ordovician	
Drakes Formation	Ordovician	
Elkhorn Formation	Ordovician	
Elwren Formation	Carboniferous	
Fairview Formation	Ordovician	
Fort Payne Chert	Carboniferous	
Four Corners Formation	Carboniferous	
Fraileys Shale	Carboniferous	
Gilbert Formation	Ordovician	
Glen Dean Limestone	Carboniferous	
Glenshaw Formation	Carboniferous	
Golconda Formation	Carboniferous	
Grant Lake Formation	Ordovician	
Hance Formation	Carboniferous	
Haney Limestone	Carboniferous	
Harrodsburg Limestone	Carboniferous	
Jeffersonville Limestone	Devonian	
Kope Formation	Ordovician	
Leipers Limestone	Ordovician	
Lexington Limestone	Ordovician	
Liberty Formation	Ordovician	
Louisville Limestone	Silurian	
Lower Whitewater	Ordovician	
McMillan Formation	Ordovician	
Miamitown Formation	Ordovician	
Mount Auburn Formation	Ordovician	
New Albany Shale	Devonian	
New Providence Formation	Carboniferous	
Ohio Shale	Devonian	
Okaw Group	Carboniferous	
Oregonia Formation	Ordovician	
Ramp Creek Formation	Carboniferous	
Reba Formation	Ordovician	
Salem Limestone	Carboniferous	
Sanderson Formation	Carboniferous	
Ste. Genevieve Formation	Carboniferous	
Stingy Creek Formation	Ordovician	
Sunset Formation	Ordovician	
Tar Springs Formation	Carboniferous	
Tate Formation	Ordovician	
Tradewater Formation	Carboniferous	
Tyrone Limestone	Ordovician	
Waynesville Formation	Ordovician	
Whitewater Formation	Ordovician	

== See also ==
- Paleontology in Kentucky
