= Cedar Sink =

Landform in Edmonson County, Kentucky, United States

Coordinates: 37.150278°N 86.153631°W

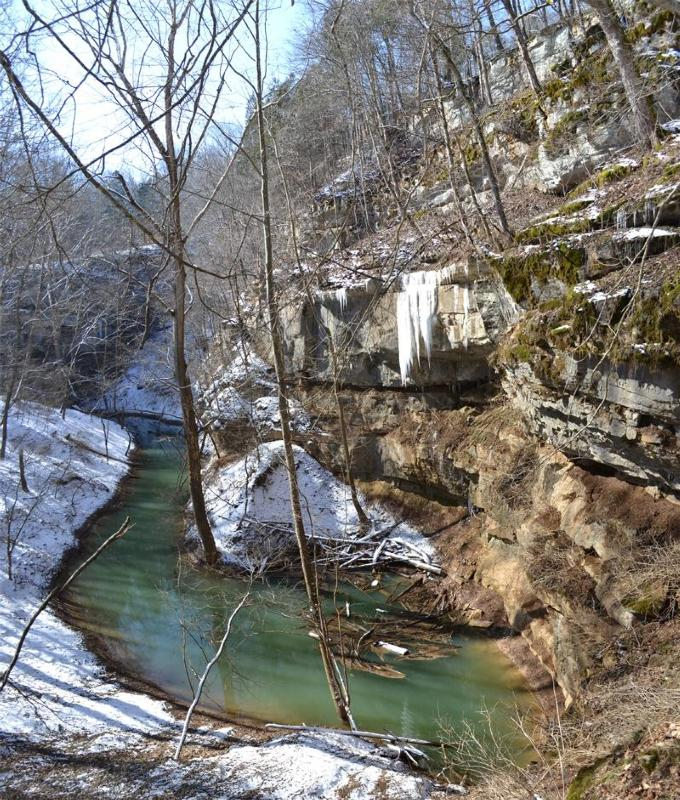
Cedar Sink stream in February 2011, following a snowfall

Cedar Sink is a vertical-walled large depression or sinkhole in the ground, located in Edmonson County, Kentucky, within Mammoth Cave National Park. The sinkhole measures 300 feet (91.4 m) from the top sandstone plateau to the bottom of the sink and was caused by collapse of the surface soil. The landscape is karst topography, which means the region is influenced by the dissolution of soluble rocks. Sinkholes, caves, and dolines typically characterize these underground drainage systems. Cedar Sink has a bottom area of about 7 acres (2.8 ha) and has more fertile soil compared to the ridgetops.

== Geomorphology ==
The rocks of Cedar Sink and the surrounding area are from the Mississippian (also known as Lower Carboniferous or Early Carboniferous) subperiod that occurred 358.9 to 323.2 million years ago.

The Big Clifty Sandstone caprock has been breached, exposing the limestone Girkin Formation and resulting in a relief approximately 200 feet (61 m) below the main plateau surface. The bottom of the sink lies another 100 feet (30.5 m) below and exposes the top of the Ste. Genevieve Limestone. The weakening of the ceiling from the breaching of the caprock and the formation of Smith, Cedar Spring, and Woolsey valleys caused the ancestral master trunk to collapse. Continuous flow in the master drainage line further undermined the sink and triggered further collapse.

Collapse sinkholes, like Cedar Sink, form after an initial subsurface collapse occurs. A collapse commonly happens at the intersection of two passages underground where the roof span is the widest and therefore weakest. The process continues as the underground stream repeatedly undercuts the cave walls, inducing collapse of the weight-bearing cantilever beams resulting in a wider passage. Erosion continues, and eventually the void reaches the surface.

Water in an ephemeral stream can be seen from the overlook and occasionally at six other places within this sink, based on the season and recent precipitation events. Exposure of the subsurface stream makes Cedar Sink a karst window. Cedar Sink is derived chiefly from two similar-sized sub-basins: Mill Hole and Procter Cave. Prior to a major storm in May 1984, all the water from Cedar Sink flowed only to Turnhole Spring.

=== Karst topography ===
The Cedar Sink area is karst topography, a landscape topography formed from the dissolution of soluble rocks such as limestone. It is characterized by underground drainage systems with sinkholes, dolines, and caves. The development of karst occurs when acidic water chemically and physically breaks down the rock surface. The acidic water is created when atmospheric carbon dioxide and falling precipitation create a weak carbonic acid (H2CO_{3}). This process occurs near the bedrock cracks or bedding planes. Over time, the fractures will widen and eventually create a drainage system network in the bedrock. The karst landscape will continue to develop over time as the water wears away at the rocks.

Karst aquifers display drainage characteristics that in many ways appear similar to surface networks. Scientists have studied parameters of surface-water hydrology and geomorphology for years, but it was not until recently that the underground water system was understood. Extensive drainage-network analysis using GIS and other tools has developed a more well-rounded view of the karst topography and the subsurface hydrologic influences occurring in Mammoth Caves National Park. Over the past four decades, an extensive investigation of the Mammoth Cave watershed useful for providing the opportunity for broader quantitative research in the organization of a large, highly developed, karst-drainage network.

== Ecology ==
The abundance of fertile soils with high water content allows for high vegetative amounts in and around Cedar Sink. Some scientists have proposed that more mesic woods may have existed before settlement. Frequent species include Acer saccharum/nigrum and Carya cordiformis in the more protected areas on richer soils. With the introduction of intense farming and ungulate browsing, prior the creation of the national park status, the ecosystem changed from a relatively stable "climax" to a greatly modified ecosystem. Other trees in the Cedar Sink area include Liriodendron, Quercus muhlenbergii and Ulmus rubra (perhaps Aesculus glabra, Tilia americana). Shrubby species include Asimina and Lindera. Some of the ground vegetation includes Athyrium pycnocarpon, Cinna arundinacea, Microstegium vimineum, Eupatorium rugosum, Festuca subverticillata (obtusa), Monarda species (the undescribed mid-western variant of clinopodia), Pilea pumila, Polygonum virginianum, Solidago flexicaulis, Tradescantia subaspera, Verbesina alternifolia.

Cedar Sink area has many organisms including the Chologaster agassizii, a spring cavefish which is endemic to Lebanon, Tennessee, and Mammoth Caves National Park. Other organisms include: question mark butterfly, tussock moth, red-spotted purple and red admiral.

Some common plants and flowering plants include: Christmas ferns, walking ferns, thimbleweed, cranefly orchid, phlox, tick trefoil, agrimony, poison ivy, Hypericum perforatum (St. John's wort), starry campion, tall bellflower, spiderworts, white avens, white tick trefoil, lopseed, pale-spiked lobelia, Ruellia (wild petunia), pale Indian plantain and Prunella vulgaris. Lactarius is a common mushroom found around Cedar Sink.

== Recreation and activities ==
The trail to Cedar Sink follows the Smith Valley floor for about ¾ mile. The trail is 1.6 miles round trip and circles the southern edge of the sink and eventually leads to a platform overlooking the sink. The trail is clearly delineated with many stairs leading to the bottom of the sink and there are several vista platforms along the ridge. The trail offers many glimpses at the once underground river system. The views from the plateau change depending on the weather; there are many ephemeral springs at the south end of the sink. The overflow route is dry at times and flowing strongly at other during high precipitation events. The main channel flow is often not at the surface throughout many parts of this region.

Geocaching is a common treasure-hunt like recreation activity in Cedar Sink. Several caches are hidden in Cedar Sink and Mammoth Caves area.

== See also ==
- List of sinkholes of the United States
- Suffosion
