= Portersville =

Portersville may refer to:

- Portersville, Connecticut, former village in Mystic, Connecticut, United States
- Portersville, Indiana, an unincorporated community in Dubois County, Indiana, United States
- Portersville, Indiana, former name of Valparaiso, Indiana, city in Porter County, Indiana, United States
- Portersville, Ohio, an unincorporated village in Perry County, Ohio, United States
- Portersville, Pennsylvania, a borough in Butler County, Pennsylvania, United States
- Portersville, Tennessee, a former municipality and precursor of Atoka, Tennessee, United States
- Portersville, West Virginia, an unincorporated community

== See also ==
- Portersville Limestone, a geological formation in Ohio, United States
