= Big Clifty Sandstone =

- Stratigraphic range: Mississippian
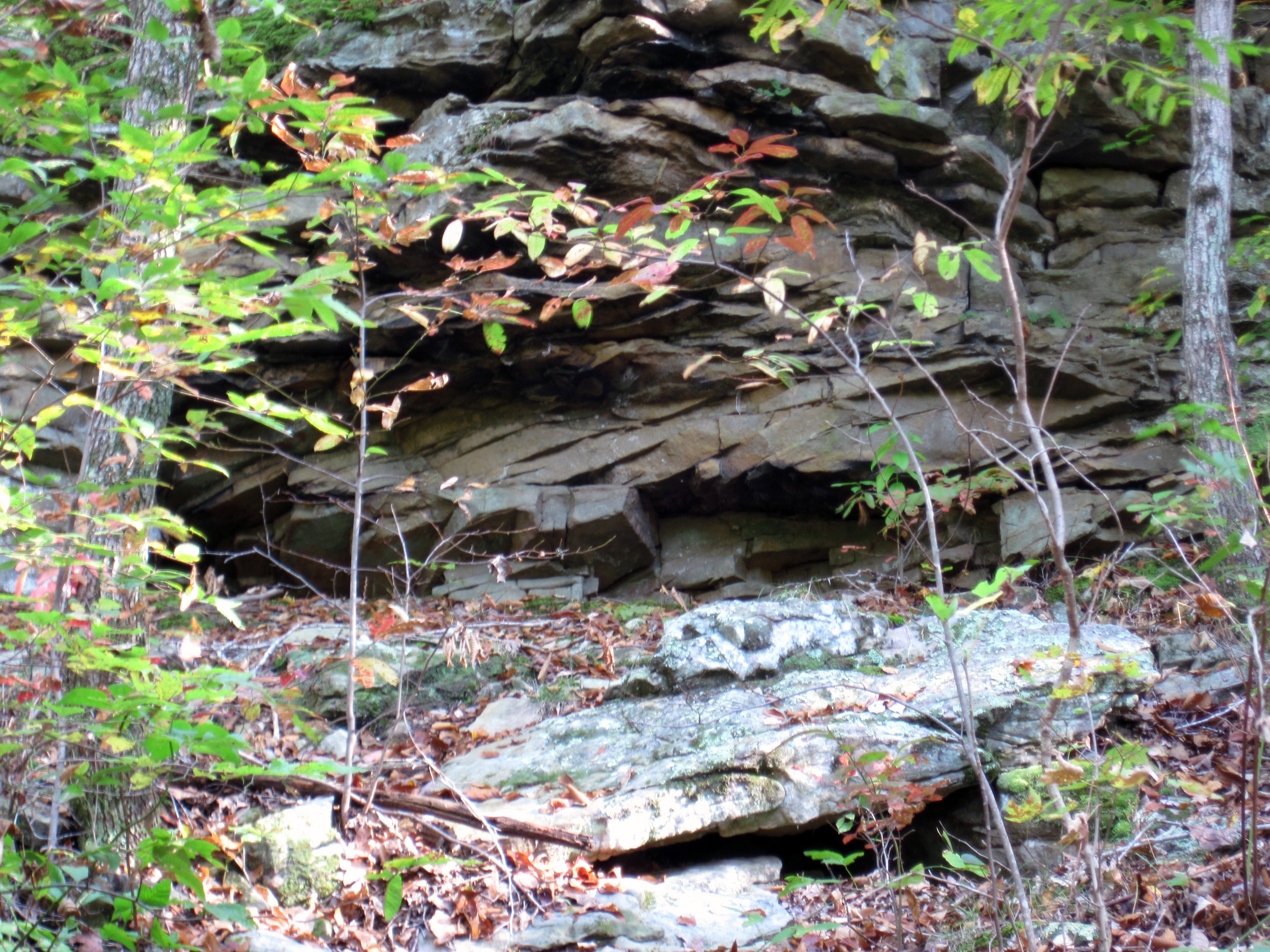
- Big Clifty Sandstone over Girkin Limestone (Upper Mississippian; Dixon Cave Trail, Mammoth Cave National Park, Kentucky)
- Type: Formation
- Unit of: Golconda Formation
- Underlies: Haney Limestone
- Overlies: Girkin Formation

Lithology
- Primary: Sandstone

Location
- Region: Illinois, Kentucky
- Country: United States

The Big Clifty Sandstone is a geologic formation in Illinois and Kentucky. It is a subunit of the Golconda Formation in Kentucky and is correlative with the Fraileys Shale to which it grades to in southern Illinois. The Big Clifty and Golconda are part of the Chesterian Series of late Mississippian age. The Big Clifty Sandstone was deposited in deltaic to marginal marine environment by the paleo Michigan River which in modern directions flowed south from the Canadian shield, the sediment source, and then westward depositing sediment across Illinois, Kentucky, and Indiana, as the Big Clifty Formation of the Stephensport Group. At Mammoth Cave National Park the Big Clifty overlies the Girkin Formation, the uppermost of three cave forming carbonate formations which the Mammoth-Flint Ridge cave system spans. Below the Girkin Formation are the Ste. Genevieve Limestone, and the St. Louis Limestone respectively. The chemically resistant sediments comprising the Big Clifty, and similar siliciclastics, act as a caprock over the dissolving carbonates. The presence of the Big Clifty is one of several contributory factors that create favorable conditions for the formation, and subsequent preservation, of connected cavernous porosity in the Mammoth-Flint Ridge cave system.

The Big Clifty Sandstone also appears as sandstone knobs throughout south-central Kentucky, including the 200-foot-tall (61 m) Pilot Rock on the border of Todd County.
