= Meramec (series) =

The Meramecian or Maramec stage is a sequence of Mississippian rocks in the Mississippi River Valley. It is named for the Meramec River in Missouri.

== Members ==
Included are the St. Louis Limestone, Ste. Genevieve Limestone, Salem Limestone, and the Harrodsburg Limestone. All of these rocks are generally thick bedded limestones with chert, gypsum, and dolomite. Some beds consist of siltstone.
