= Big Clifty Formation =

Geologic formation in Indiana, United States

- Stratigraphic range: Mississippian
- Type: Formation
- Unit of: Stephensport Group
- Underlies: Haney Limestone
- Overlies: Beech Creek Limestone

Location
- Region: Indiana
- Country: United States

The Big Clifty Formation is a geologic formation in Indiana. It preserves fossils dating back to the Carboniferous period.

In Illinois and Kentucky, the Big Clifty is referred to as the Big Clifty Sandstone and has been assigned to the Golconda Formation.

== See also ==
- List of fossiliferous stratigraphic units in Indiana
