= List of fossiliferous stratigraphic units in Ohio =

This article contains a list of fossil-bearing stratigraphic units in the state of Ohio, U.S.

== Sites ==
Group or Formation	Period	Notes
Putnam Hill Formation	Carboniferous	
Vanport Formation	Carboniferous	
Washingtonville Formation	Carboniferous	
Zaleski Formation	Carboniferous	
Ames Formation	Carboniferous	
Arnheim Formation	Ordovician	
Bedford Shale	Devonian	
Bellevue Formation	Ordovician	
Bisher Formation	Silurian	
Borden Formation	Carboniferous	
Brassfield Limestone	Silurian	
Breathitt Formation	Carboniferous	
Bull Fork Formation	Ordovician	
Chagrin Shale	Devonian	
Clays Ferry Formation	Ordovician	
Cleveland Shale	Devonian	
Columbus Limestone	Devonian	
Ames Limestone	Carboniferous	
Duquesne Coal	Carboniferous	
Glenshaw Formation	Carboniferous	
Mahoning Formation	Carboniferous	
Corniferous Limestone	Devonian	
Corryville Formation	Ordovician	
Cuyahoga Formation	Carboniferous	
Lucas Formation	Devonian	
Dillsboro Formation	Ordovician	
Dundee Formation	Devonian	
Greene Formation	Permian	
Washington Formation	Permian, Carboniferous	
Kope Formation	Ordovician	
McMicken Formation	Ordovician	
Fairview Formation	Ordovician	
Freeport Formation	Carboniferous	
Glenshaw Formation	Carboniferous	
Grant Lake Formation	Ordovician	
Greenfield Formation	Silurian	
Holland Quarry Shale	Devonian	
Liberty Formation	Ordovician	
Lilley Formation	Silurian	
Lockport Dolomite	Silurian	
Logan Formation	Carboniferous	
Louisville Limestone	Silurian	
Lucas Dolostone	Devonian	
McMillan Formation	Ordovician	
Maxville Limestone	Carboniferous	
Maysville Limestone	Ordovician	
Fairview Formation	Ordovician	
Miamitown Formation	Ordovician	
Mount Auburn Formation	Ordovician	
Ohio Black Shale	Devonian	
Olentangy Shale	Devonian	
Oregonia Formation	Ordovician	
Peebles Dolomite	Silurian	
Plum Brook Shale	Devonian	
Portersville Limestone	Carboniferous	
Pottsville Formation	Carboniferous	
Putnam Hill Formation	Carboniferous	
Richmond Formation	Ordovician	
Elkhorn Formation	Ordovician	
Waynesville Formation	Ordovician	
Whitewater Formation	Ordovician	
Saluda Formation	Ordovician	
Silica Formation	Devonian	
Sunset Formation	Ordovician	
Sylvania Sandstone	Devonian	
Tymochtee Formation	Silurian	

== See also ==
- Paleontology in Ohio
