= Stab, Kentucky =

Unincorporated community in Kentucky, United States

Stab
- Unincorporated community
- Location within the state of Kentucky Stab (the United States)
- Coordinates: 37°9′5″N 84°26′13″W
- Country: United States
- State: Kentucky
- County: Pulaski
- Elevation: 837 ft (255 m)
- Time zone: UTC-6 (Central (CST))
  - Summer (DST): UTC-5 (CST)
- ZIP codes: 42557
- GNIS feature ID: 515642

Stab is an unincorporated community in Pulaski County, Kentucky, United States.

== Description ==
A post office called Stab was established in 1922, and remained in operation until it was discontinued in 1994. The name Stab was chosen in part for its brevity; the first choice had been rejected as too long by postal authorities.

Stab is noted as the location of a karst window formation, Short Creek.
