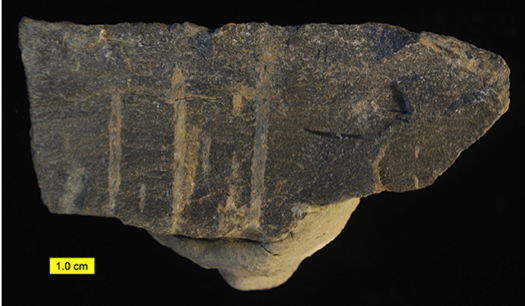
- Stigmatella personata; trepostome bryozoan encrusting the underside of a carbonate hardground; Corryville Formation; Upper Ordovician; Mason County, Kentucky.

Scientific classification
- Kingdom: Animalia
- Phylum: Bryozoa
- Class: Stenolaemata
- Order: †Trepostomatida
- Family: †Heterotrypidae
- Genus: †Stigmatella; Ulrich and Bassler, 1904

Species
- Stigmatella catenulata var. A Parks and Dyer (1922); Stigmatella halysa Armstrong, 1945 (= S. catenulata var. B Parks and Dyer (1922)); Stigmatella halysa crassa Armstrong, 1945 (= S. sessilis crassa Dyer, 1925); Stigmatella halysa erindalensis Armstrong, 1945; Stigmatella crenulata Ulrich and Bassler (1904); Stigmatella hybrida Dyer (1925); Stigmatella personata lobata Dyer (1925); Stigmatella vulgaris Parks and Dyer (1922)

= Stigmatella (bryozoan) =

Extinct genus of bryozoans

Stigmatella is an extinct genus of bryozoans in the family Heterotrypidae. It is known from the Ordovician period and found in the U.S. states of Ohio, Kentucky and Indiana. Its colonies can form branches, lobes, or masses made from new layers encrusting upon older ones. In Kentucky, fossil remains of species Stigmatella personata that lived in underwater caves have been found, growing 'upside-down' on the cave ceiling.

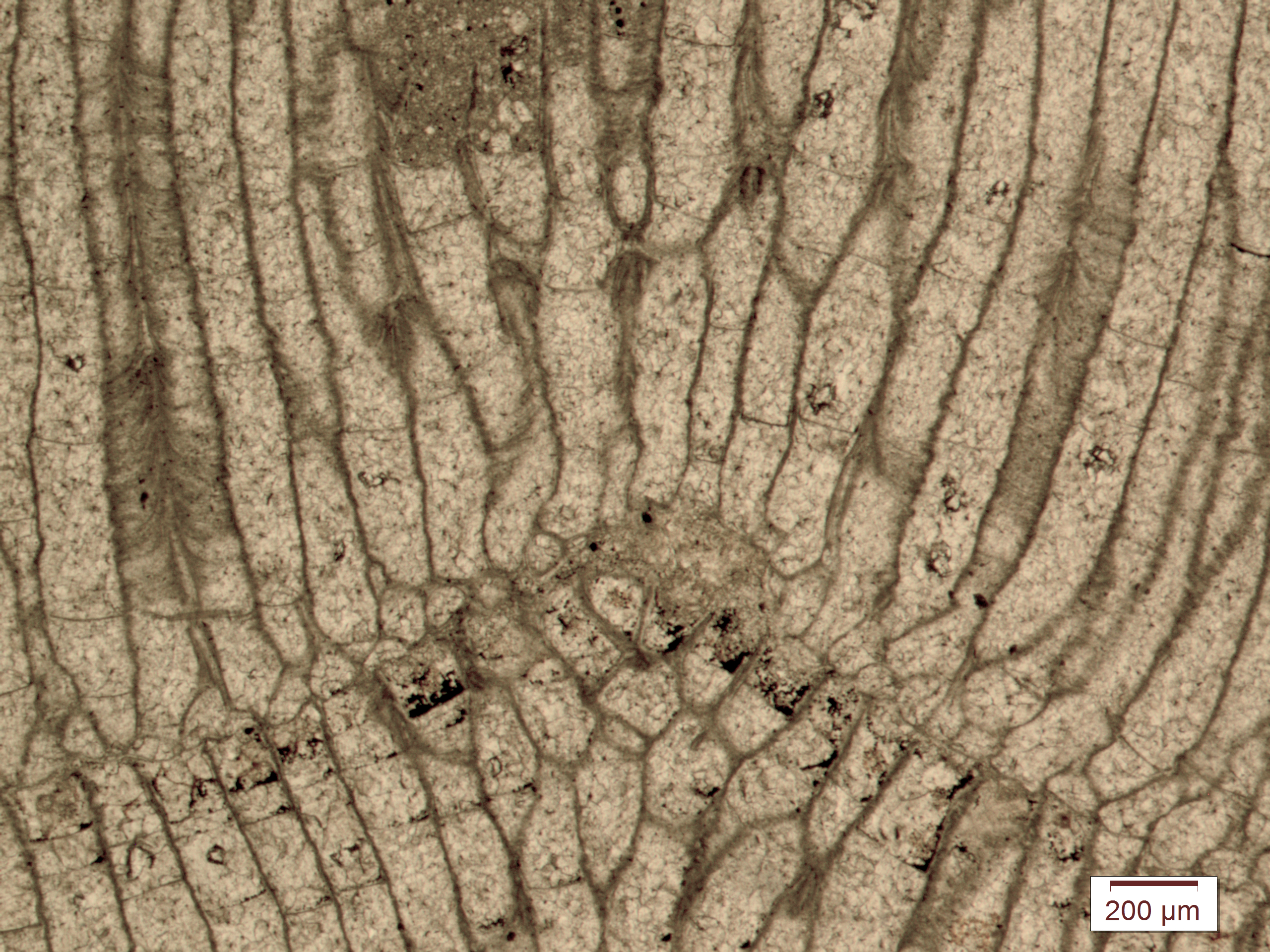
Longitudinal thin-section of Stigmatella personata encrusting a carbonate hardground; Corryville Formation; Upper Ordovician; Mason County, Kentucky.

== See also ==
- List of prehistoric bryozoans
