= Girkin Formation =

Geologic formation in Kentucky, USA

The Girkin Formation is a geologic formation located in the Chester Escarpment of central Kentucky, USA. It comprises a level of Mammoth Cave and lies above the Ste. Genevieve Limestone and St. Louis Limestone and below the Big Clifty Sandstone in that area. The Girkin is a limestone Mississippian in age.

Members of the Girkin are as follows in descending order:

- Beech Creek Member
- Elwren Member
- Reelsville Member
- Sample Member
- Beaver Bend Member
- Bethel Member
- Paoli Member
