= Paoli Formation =

Geologic formation in Indiana, Illinois, Kentucky, and Missouri

- Stratigraphic range: Mississippian
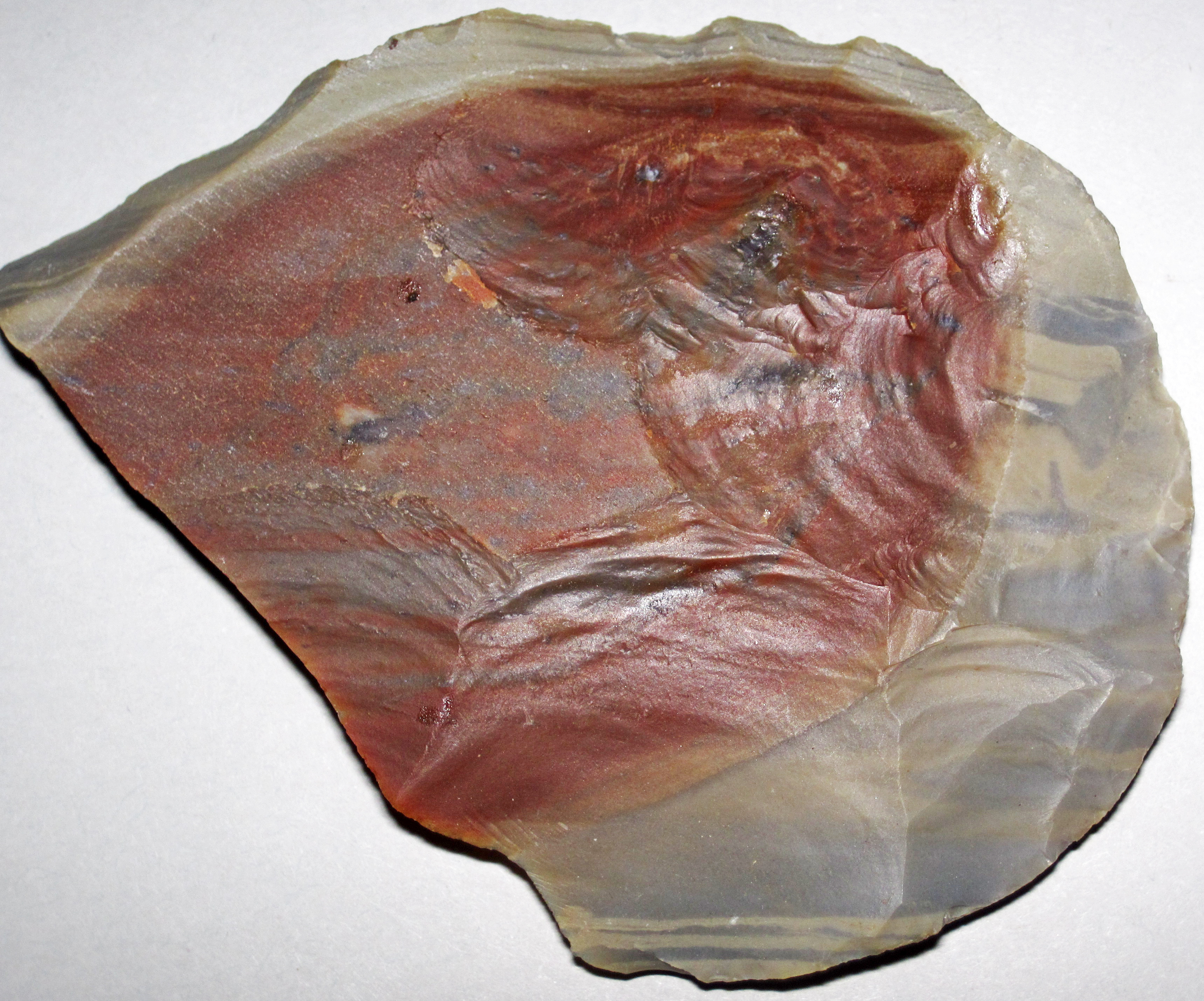
- Carter Cave Flint (Kentucky), attributed to the Paoli Limestone
- Type: Formation
- Unit of: Blue River Group, St. Louis Group
- Sub-units: Downeys Bluff Member; Yankeetown Member; Renault Member; Aux Vases Member
- Underlies: Bethel Formation
- Overlies: Ste. Genevieve Limestone

Location
- Region: Indiana; Illinois; Kentucky; Missouri
- Country: United States

The Paoli Formation, Paoli Limestone, or Paoli Chert is a geologic formation in Indiana, Illinois, Kentucky and Missouri. This formation contains members that are known hydrocarbon reservoirs.

== Stratigraphy ==
=== Downeys Bluff Member ===
The Downeys Bluff Member is the uppermost or top member. It is grey, light to medium in hue. The limestone is fairly clean, with small amounts of clay and shale. It contains a variety of textures, the most noted are micritic, oolitic and skeletal.

=== Popcorn Sandstone Member ===
Popcorn Sandstone Member or Popcorn Sandstone Bed is the lowest member of the Paoli and marks the base of the Chesterian Series. It is not found throughout the entire Paoli. The Popcorn is sometimes included with the Aux Vases Member in other areas it is its own separate member.
