= Elwren Formation =

Geologic formation in Kentucky, United States

- Stratigraphic range: Mississippian
- Type: Formation
- Unit of: West Baden Group
- Underlies: Beech Creek Limestone
- Overlies: Reelsville Limestone

Location
- Region: Indiana and Kentucky
- Country: United States

The Elwren Formation is a geologic formation in Kentucky. It preserves fossils dating back to the Carboniferous period.

== See also ==
- List of fossiliferous stratigraphic units in Kentucky
