= Blue River Group =

Geological group in Indiana, USA

- Stratigraphic range: Mississippian
- Type: Group
- Unit of: Sanders Group
- Sub-units: St. Louis Limestone, Ste. Genevieve Limestone, Paoli Limestone
- Underlies: West Baden Group
- Overlies: Borden Group
- Thickness: Varies; thins northward in Indiana

Lithology
- Primary: Limestone
- Other: Dolomite, calcareous sandstone, argillaceous limestone

Location
- Region: Indiana
- Country: United States

Type section
- Named for: Blue River, Indiana

The Blue River Group is a Mississippian (Carboniferous) geologic group named and defined in Indiana. It is composed predominantly of carbonate rocks, including micritic, oolitic, and cherty limestones as well as locally dolomitic units, and in Putnam County includes strata assigned to the St. Louis and Ste. Genevieve limestones.

The group preserves marine fossils of the Carboniferous, including colonial rugosa such as Lithostrotion proliferum, together with other fossil remains characteristic of shallow carbonate platform environments, and form important hydrocarbon reservoirs in parts of the Illinois Basin. The succession thins northward toward the limit of its outcrop belt, and subsurface studies have identified persistent marker beds of cherty micritic limestone and chalky siliceous dolomite that aid stratigraphic correlation.
