= Bisher Formation =

Geologic formation in Ohio

- Stratigraphic range: Sheinwoodian
- Type: Formation
- Underlies: Boyle Formation and Lilley Formation
- Overlies: Crab Orchard Formation and Estill Shale

Location
- Region: Kentucky and Ohio
- Country: United States

The Bisher Formation is a geologic formation in Ohio. It preserves fossils dating back to the Silurian period.

== See also ==
- List of fossiliferous stratigraphic units in Ohio
