= Freeport Formation =

- Stratigraphic range: Pennsylvanian
- Type: Formation

Location
- Region: Pennsylvania, Ohio
- Country: United States

Type section
- Named for: Freeport, Pennsylvania
- Named by: H. D. Rogers, 1840

The Freeport Formation is a geologic formation in Pennsylvania and Ohio. It preserves fossils dating back to the Late Pennsylvanian period. It is within the Allegheny Group.

== See also ==
- List of fossiliferous stratigraphic units in Ohio
