= Alvy Creek Formation =

Geologic formation in Kentucky, United States

- Stratigraphic range: Carboniferous
- Type: Formation

Location
- Coordinates: 36.8°N 84.6°W
- Region: Kentucky
- Country: United States

The Alvy Creek Formation is a geologic formation in Kentucky. It preserves fossils dating back to the Carboniferous period .

== See also ==
- List of fossiliferous stratigraphic units in Kentucky
