= Estill Shale =

Geologic formation in Ohio, United States

- Stratigraphic range: Silurian
- Type: Formation
- Underlies: Bisher Formation
- Overlies: Drowning Creek Formation

Location
- Country: United States
- Extent: Ohio

The Estill Shale is a geologic formation in Ohio. It dates back to the Silurian.
