= Copland Coal =

Geologic formation in Kentucky, USA

- Stratigraphic range: Carboniferous
- Type: Formation

Location
- Region: Kentucky
- Country: United States

The Copland Coal is a geologic formation in Kentucky. It preserves fossils dating back to the Carboniferous period.

== See also ==
- List of fossiliferous stratigraphic units in Kentucky
