= Crab Orchard Formation =

Geologic formation in Kentucky, United States

- Stratigraphic range: Telychian-Aeronian; 440–435 Ma
- Type: Formation
- Underlies: Bisher Formation
- Overlies: Brassfield Formation

Location
- Region: Kentucky
- Country: United States

The Crab Orchard Formation is a geologic formation in Kentucky, United States. It dates back to the Telychian to Aeronian stages of the Silurian period.
