= Calloway Creek Formation =

Geologic formation in Kentucky, US

- Stratigraphic range: Ordovician
- Type: Formation
- Underlies: Ashlock Formation
- Overlies: Garrard Siltstone

Location
- Region: Kentucky
- Country: United States

The Calloway Creek Formation is a geologic formation in Kentucky. It preserves fossils dating back to the Ordovician period.

== See also ==
- List of fossiliferous stratigraphic units in Kentucky
