= Maysville Limestone =

Geologic formation in Ohio, United States

- Stratigraphic range: Ordovician
- Type: Formation

Location
- Region: Ohio
- Country: United States

The Maysville Limestone is a geologic formation in Ohio. It preserves fossils dating back to the Ordovician period.

== See also ==
- List of fossiliferous stratigraphic units in Ohio
