= Golconda Formation =

Geologic formation in Kentucky, USA

- Stratigraphic range: Carboniferous
- Type: Formation
- Sub-units: Beech Creek Limestone, Big Clifty Sandstone, Fraileys Shale, Haney Limestone

Location
- Region: Georgia, Illinois, Indiana, Kentucky, Missouri and Tennessee
- Country: United States

The Golconda Formation is a geologic formation in Kentucky. It preserves fossils dating back to the Carboniferous period. In Indiana, the Golconda, it is called the Golconda Limestone and is part of the Stephensport Group.

== See also ==
- List of fossiliferous stratigraphic units in Kentucky
