= Drowning Creek Formation =

Geologic formation in Ohio, United States

- Stratigraphic range: Rhuddanian - Telychian
- Type: Formation
- Underlies: Estill Shale
- Overlies: Drakes Formation

Location
- Country: United States
- Extent: Kentucky and Ohio

The Drowning Creek Formation is a geologic formation in Ohio, United States. It dates back to the Silurian.
