= Ramp Creek Formation =

Geologic formation in the United States

- Stratigraphic range: Mississippian
- Type: Formation
- Unit of: Sanders Group
- Underlies: Harrodsburg Limestone
- Overlies: Edwardsville Formation

Location
- Region: Indiana and Kentucky
- Country: United States

The Ramp Creek Formation is a geologic formation in Indiana and Kentucky. It preserves fossils dating back to the Carboniferous period.

== See also ==
- List of fossiliferous stratigraphic units in Kentucky
