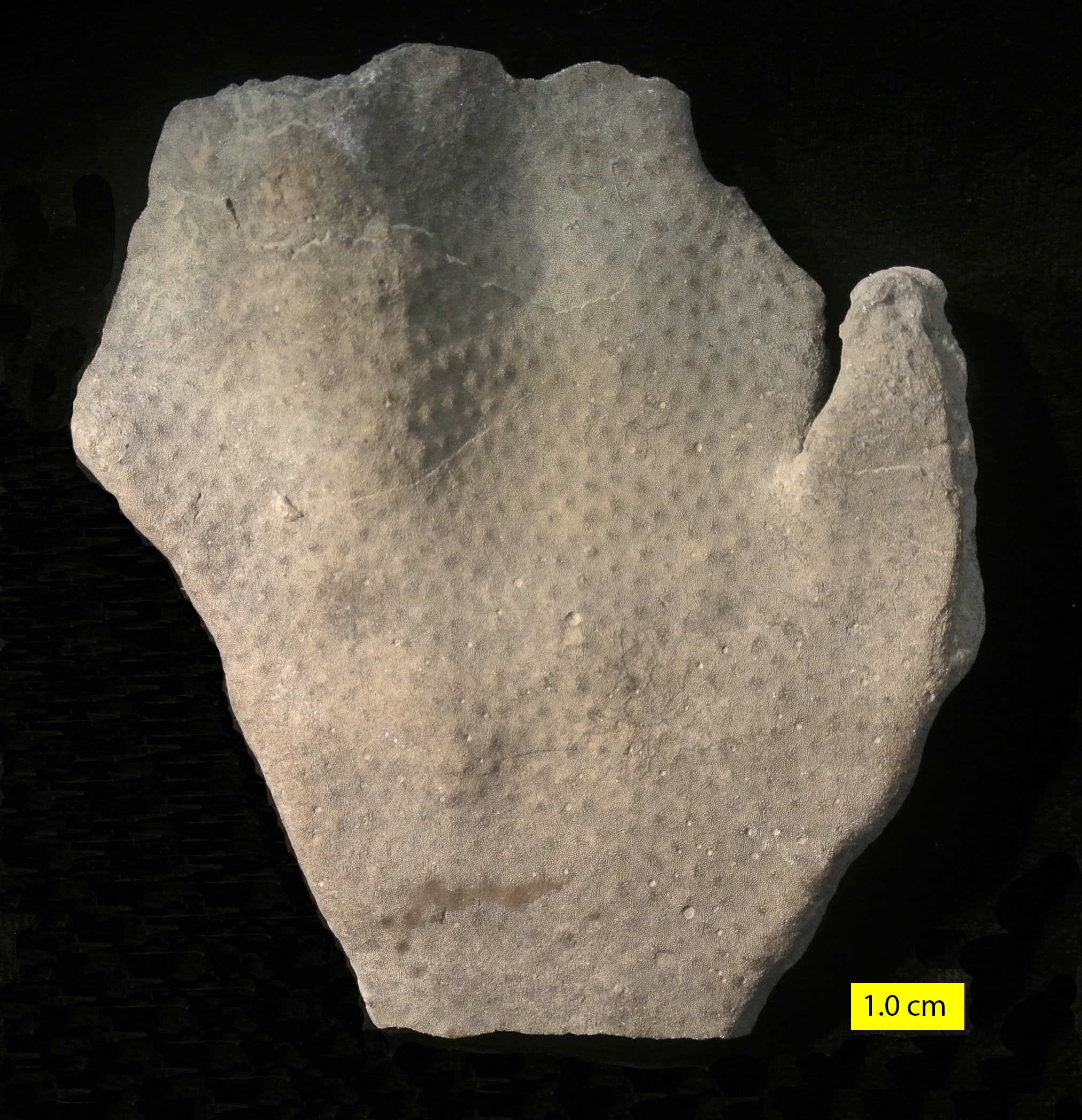
- Heterotrypa sp. from the Corryville Formation (Upper Ordovician) in Covington, Kentucky.

Scientific classification
- Kingdom: Animalia
- Phylum: Bryozoa
- Class: Stenolaemata
- Order: †Trepostomatida
- Family: †Heterotrypidae; Ulrich, 1890

Genera
- Dekayia; Heterotrypa; Petigopora; Phragmotrypa; Eichwaldopora Pushkin and Popov 2005; Leioclema; Reptonoditrypa Schaefer and Fois 1987; Stigmatella

= Heterotrypidae =

Extinct family of moss animals

Heterotrypidae is an extinct bryozoan family in the order Trepostomatida.
