= Short Creek (Kentucky) =

Coordinates: 37°08′56″N 84°26′19″W

Short Creek is a substantial but very short watercourse in Pulaski County in the U.S. state of Kentucky. The water, in volume equivalent to a large creek or small river, flows out of a cave, runs for 200 feet (61 meters) through the sunlight, and then vanishes into another cave. The feature is located at the bottom of a hill hollow below the unincorporated community of Stab, Kentucky. The nearest town of size is Somerset, Kentucky. The mouth of the stream is located at coordinates 37.14897, -84.43855.

== Geology ==
Short Creek is described by the Kentucky Geological Survey as a karst window, a short section of watercourse, formerly geologically underground, that has been exposed by the erosion or other removal of the sedimentary deposits above it. The Kentucky Film Office characterizes Short Creek as a colorful geological feature of the state, and encourages film crews to consider it for location shooting. The creek flows through private property, but can be seen from an adjacent road and public-right-of-way.
