= Stingy Creek Formation =

Geologic formation in Kentucky

- Stratigraphic range: Ordovician
- Type: Formation

Location
- Region: Kentucky
- Country: United States

The Stingy Creek Formation is a geologic formation in Kentucky. It preserves fossils dating back to the Ordovician period.

== See also ==
- List of fossiliferous stratigraphic units in Kentucky
