= Dekayia =

Scientific classification
- Kingdom: Animalia
- Phylum: Bryozoa
- Class: Stenolaemata
- Order: †Trepostomatida
- Family: †Heterotrypidae
- Genus: †Dekayia; Milne-Edwards & Haime, 1851

Extinct genus of bryozoans

Dekayia is an extinct genus of Ordovician bryozoans of the family Heterotrypidae. Its colonies can be branching, encrusting, or massive. All species have acanthopores in varying sizes and numbers. The autozooecia appear angular or sub-angular viewed through a cross-section of the colony, and their walls are distinctively undulating or crenulated. Maculae generally protrude from the colony surface very little or at all, and can contain unusually large autozooecia and a cluster of mesozooecia in their centers.
