= Buffalo Wallow Group =

Geologic group in the United States

- Stratigraphic range: Mississippian; Upper Chesterian
- Type: Group
- Sub-units: Tobinsport Formation; Negli Creek Limestone Member; Mt. Pleasant Sandstone Member; Bristow Sandstone Member; Siberia Limestone Member; Branchville Formation; Leopold Limestone Member; Vienna Limestone Member; Tar Springs Formation; Tick Ridge Sandstone Member
- Underlies: Mansfield Formation
- Overlies: Glen Dean Limestone

Lithology
- Primary: Shale
- Other: Sandstone, Limestone

Location
- Region: Indiana, Kentucky
- Country: United States

Type section
- Named by: Butts (1917)

The Buffalo Wallow Group is a geologic group found in Indiana and Kentucky. It is equivalent to the Upper Pope Group as the two share some formations. However many of the formations in the Upper Pope pinch out and are not present in the Buffalo Wallow. The Buffalo Wallow is defined as the formations between the top of the Glen Dean Limestone up to the disconformity where it meets the Mansfield Limestone.

== Description ==
The Buffalo Wallow Group is made up of approximately 70% Shale including fissile shales, claystones, and siltstones. The remaining lithology is made up of mostly sandstone and limestone.

== Stratigraphy ==
The Buffalo Wallow Group contains mostly shale. It is bound on its top and base by limestone formations. The top is marked by an erosional disconformity

=== Tobinsport Formation ===
A formation in Illinois containing 4 members that are linked to other formations in the Upper Pope Group. The Negli Creek Limestone of the Kinkaid formation to the west. Mt. Pleasant Sandstone, Bristow Sandstone, and Siberia Limestone. The Siberia is a thin tongue of the Menard formation.

=== Branchville Formation ===
The Branchville Formation is a geologic formation in Indiana. It has two limestone members, the Leopold Member and the Vienna Member.

=== Tar Springs Formation ===
This sandstone unit is 0-150' thick. The Tar Springs consists of interbedded sandstone and shale, creating closed reservoirs within the sand. For this reason it is the largest oil producing formation in Illinois. Estimated to have accounted for more than 60% of the oil production in the state.
