= Mahoning Formation =

Geologic formation in Ohio, United States

- Stratigraphic range: Carboniferous
- Type: Formation

Location
- Region: Ohio
- Country: United States

The Mahoning Formation is a geologic formation in Ohio. It preserves fossils dating back to the Carboniferous period.

== See also ==
- List of fossiliferous stratigraphic units in Ohio
