= Okaw Group =

Geologic group in Kentucky, United States

- Stratigraphic range: Carboniferous
- Type: Group

Location
- Region: Kentucky
- Country: United States

The Okaw Group is a geologic group in Kentucky, USA. It preserves fossils dating back to the Carboniferous period .

== See also ==
- List of fossiliferous stratigraphic units in Kentucky
