= Ashlock Formation =

Geologic formation in Kentucky, United States

- Stratigraphic range: Ordovician
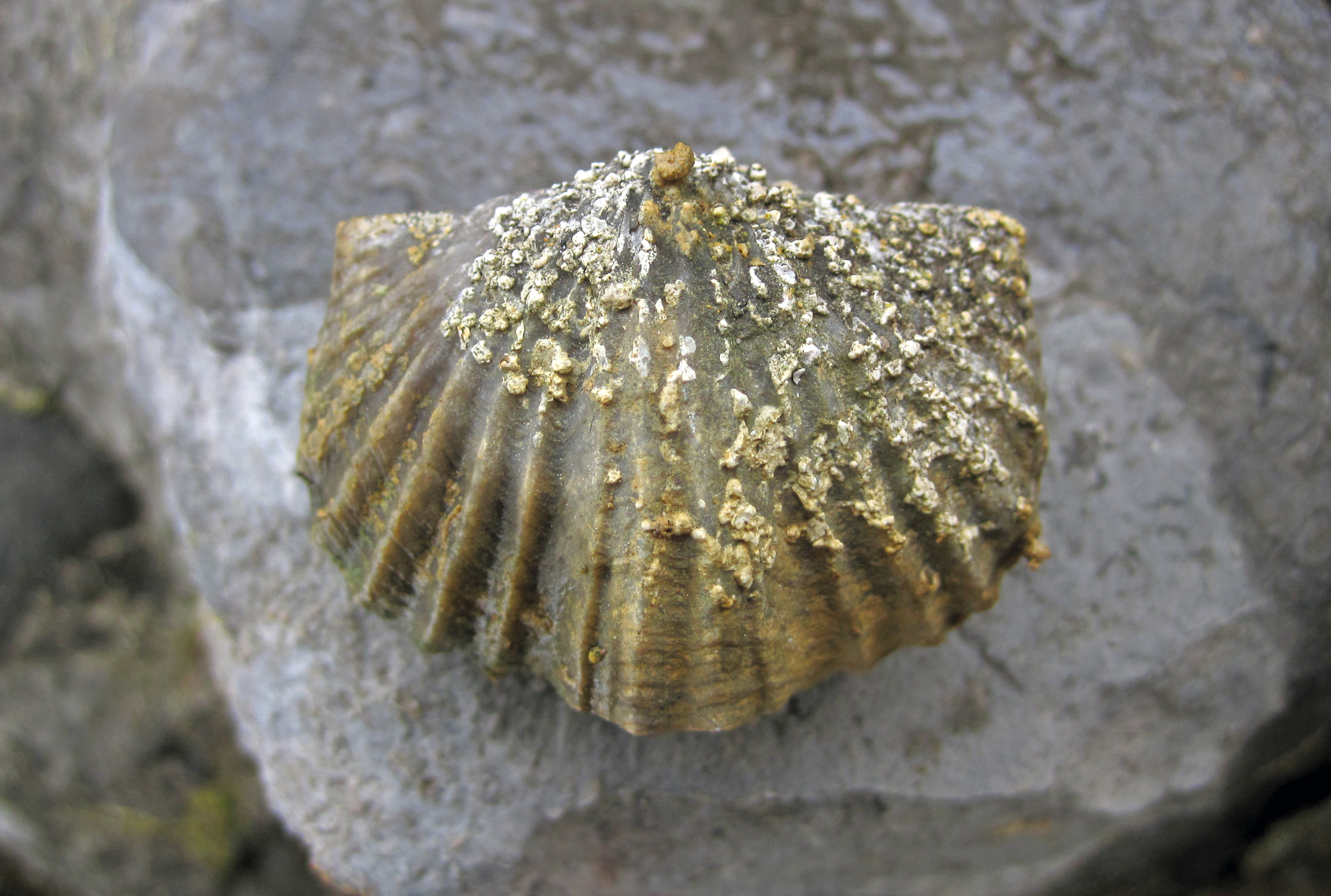
- Brachiopod fossil from the Ashlock Formation
- Type: Formation
- Underlies: Drakes Formation
- Overlies: Calloway Creek Formation

Location
- Region: Kentucky
- Country: United States

The Ashlock Formation is a geologic formation in Kentucky. It preserves fossils dating back to the Ordovician period .

== See also ==
- List of fossiliferous stratigraphic units in Kentucky
