= Muldraugh Formation =

Geological formation in Indiana, United States

- Stratigraphic range: Mississippian
- Type: Formation
- Unit of: Sanders Group
- Underlies: Harrodsburg Limestone
- Overlies: Edwardsville Formation

Location
- Region: Indiana
- Country: United States

The Muldraugh Formation is a geological formation in Indiana. It preserves fossils dating back to the Carboniferous period.

== See also ==
- List of fossiliferous stratigraphic units in Indiana
