= Portersville, West Virginia =

Unincorporated community in West Virginia, US

Coordinates: 38°20′07″N 82°07′50″W

Portersville is an unincorporated community in Lincoln County, in the U.S. state of West Virginia.

== History ==
A post office called Portersville was established in 1879, and remained in operation until 1950. The community was named after David Porter, the original owner of the town site.
