= Karst window =

Unroofed portion of a cavern which reveals part of a subterranean river

A karst window, also known as a karst fenster, is a geomorphic feature found in karst landscapes where an underground river is visible from the surface within a sinkhole. In this feature, a spring emerges, then the discharge abruptly disappears into a sinkhole. The word fenster is German for 'window', as these features are windows into the karst landscape.

The term is used to denote an unroofed portion of a cavern which reveals part of a subterranean river. A complex system of caves, known as karst topography, evolves from the effects of water erosion on carbonate rocks such as limestone, dolomite or gypsum. "A karst fenster is caused by a caving in of portions of the roof of a subterranean stream, thus making some of the underground stream visible from the surface". Theories in the creation of karst topography and karst fensters involve vadose water above the water table, and deep-circulating phreatic water (water in the zone of saturation) eroding away subsurface rock. Karst fensters may also form because of weathering from above.

An example of a karst window or fenster, recognized by the Kentucky Geological Survey, is Short Creek in Pulaski County, where a small river emerges and disappears in a space of less than 100 meters in length. An example of this formation on public parkland is Cedar Sink in Mammoth Cave National Park, Kentucky, where small watercourses emerge and disappear at the bottom of a large sinkhole.

Illustration of development of karst window by roof rock collapse
