= Clays Ferry Formation =

Geologic formation in Kentucky and Ohio, United States

- Stratigraphic range: Ordovician
- Type: Formation
- Underlies: Garrard Siltstone
- Overlies: Lexington Limestone

Location
- Region: Ohio
- Country: United States

The Clays Ferry Formation is a geologic formation in Ohio and Kentucky. It preserves fossils dating back to the Ordovician period, especially rafinesquina.

== See also ==
- List of fossiliferous stratigraphic units in Ohio
