= Charles Butts (paleontologist) =

American paleontologist (1863–1946)

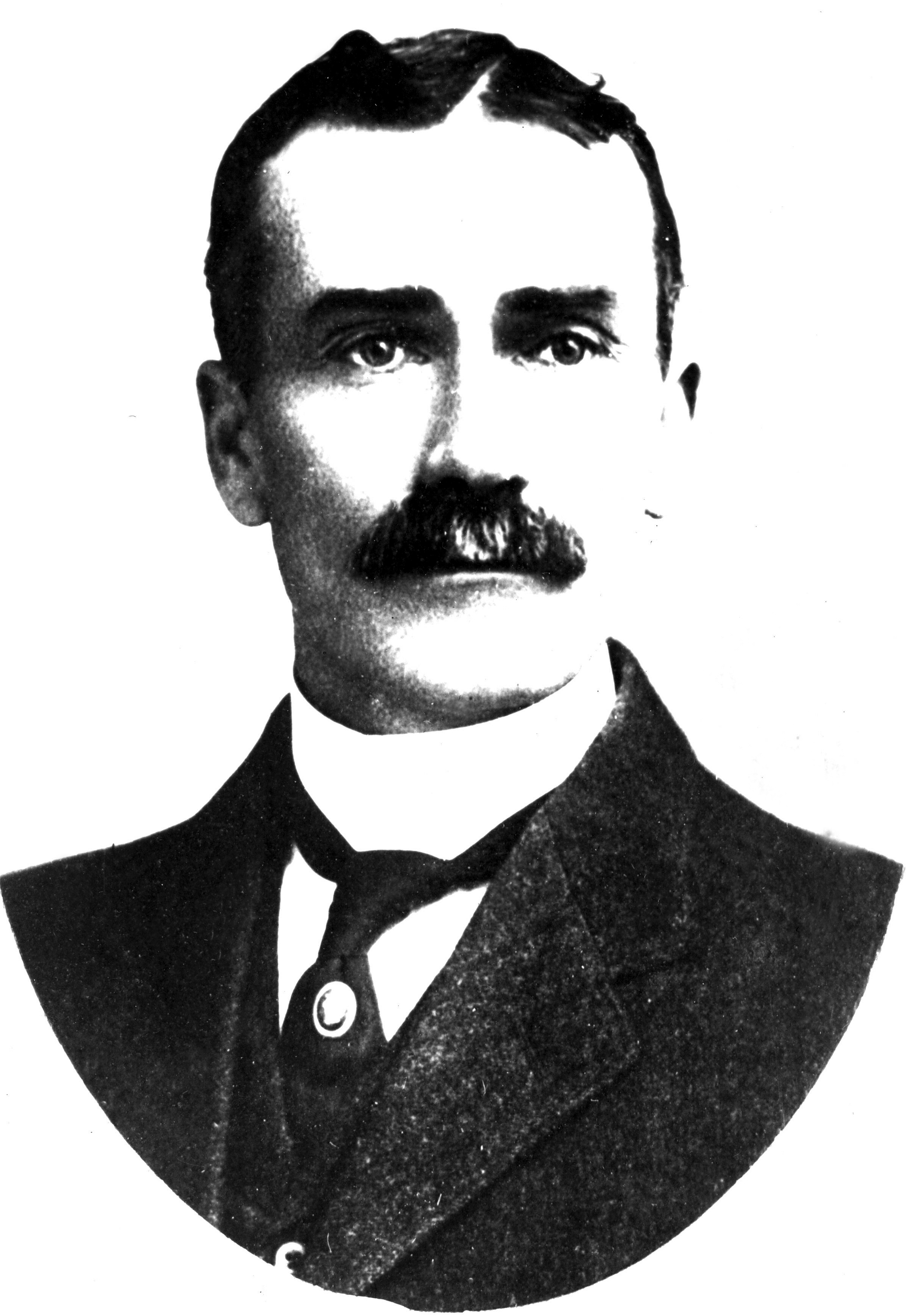
- Butts in 1901
- Born: September 16, 1863; Portville, New York, US
- Died: October 4, 1946 (aged 83)

Charles Butts (1863–1946) was an American paleontologist.

== Biography ==
Butts was born on September 16, 1863, in Portville, New York. In 1899 he got his bachelor's degree, following by the master's in 1900 from Alfred University and in 1927 University of Alabama awarded him an honorary doctorate of science. In 1901 he joined the United States Geological Survey for a position as assistant geologist, and then was promoted to paleontologist in 1909, and in 1912 became a geologist. He worked with USGS till his retirement in 1933. Starting from 1933 he was hired by the Virginia Geological Survey, for mapping of the Paleozoic formations of the Appalachian valley. While being employed, he conducted a lot of geological surveys in states like Alabama, Kentucky, and Virginia.

He died on October 4, 1946, in Washington, D.C.

== Works ==
- 1910 — Birmingham Folio, Alabama. Washington, D.C. U.S. Geological Survey
- 1914-1915 — Geology of Jefferson County, Kentucky. Frankfort, Kentucky
- 1917 — The Mississippian Series of Western Kentucky. The State Journal Company.
- 1922 — The Mississippian Series of Eastern Kentucky. Lexington, Kentucky, Kentucky Geological Survey
- 1926 — Analyses of Alabama Coals. Birmingham, Alabama. Birmingham Printing Co.
- 1940 — Geology of the Applachian Valley in Virginia. Richmond, Virginia. Conservation Commission
