= Festuca subverticillata =

Scientific classification
- Kingdom: Plantae
- Clade: Tracheophytes
- Clade: Angiosperms
- Clade: Monocots
- Clade: Commelinids
- Order: Poales
- Family: Poaceae
- Subfamily: Pooideae
- Genus: Festuca
- Species: F. subverticillata

Binomial name
- Festuca subverticillata (Pers.) E.B.Alexeev

Species of flowering plant

Festuca subverticillata is a species of grass in the family Poaceae. This species is native eastern North America.

== Habitat ==
Festuca subverticillata is perennial and mainly grows in swamps, rich woods.

== Description ==
=== Florets ===
Festuca subverticillata has loose branching clusters on the tip of its stem, grows from 4 to 10 inches (10 to 25 cm) long and usually has 1 to 3 branches per node. Branches are erect to ascending. Panicles nod to one side in flowering time. Each branch has several stalked spikelets arranged on the tip. Spikelets are 5 to 8 millimetres (0.20 to 0.31 in) long, having 2 to 5 florets being flattened to some extent, and are typically sterile.

=== Glumes and spikelets ===
A pair of bracts are at the base of the spikelet, lance-elliptic, hairless, which points to the tip. Spikelets lack awns. Lower glumes are 2.5 to 3.5 millimetres (0.098 to 0.138 in). The upper glumes are slightly longer or as long and are 3-veined. The pair of bracts surround the floret are the lemma and palea, just as long as the upper glume if not slightly longer. The lemma is slightly thicker than the upper glume, slightly 5-veined, blunt, hairless and awnless. The palea is 2-nerved and is just as long as the lemma. Fertile florets and sterile florets are similar, however sterile florets are underdeveloped.

=== Leaves and stems ===
Leaves span about 4 to 10 inches (10 to 25 cm) long and 3 to 10 millimetres (0.12 to 0.39 in) wide, lacking hairs, slightly rough to smooth, has 9 to 35 veins with midvein most prominent and is flat. Upper surface of the leaves is dull green to shiny dark green.

Its sheath lacks hair, edges fused for about 1/3 of its length at the front which for a narrow, long 'V'. The ligule is 0.5 to 1 millimetre (0.020 to 0.039 in) long, with along the top being ragged along the top of the edge lacking hair. Stems and nodes also lack hair. Single or multiple stems form from the base, clumping, being erect or prostrate.
