= Salem Limestone =

Geologic formation in the United States

Salem Formation
- Stratigraphic range: Mississippian
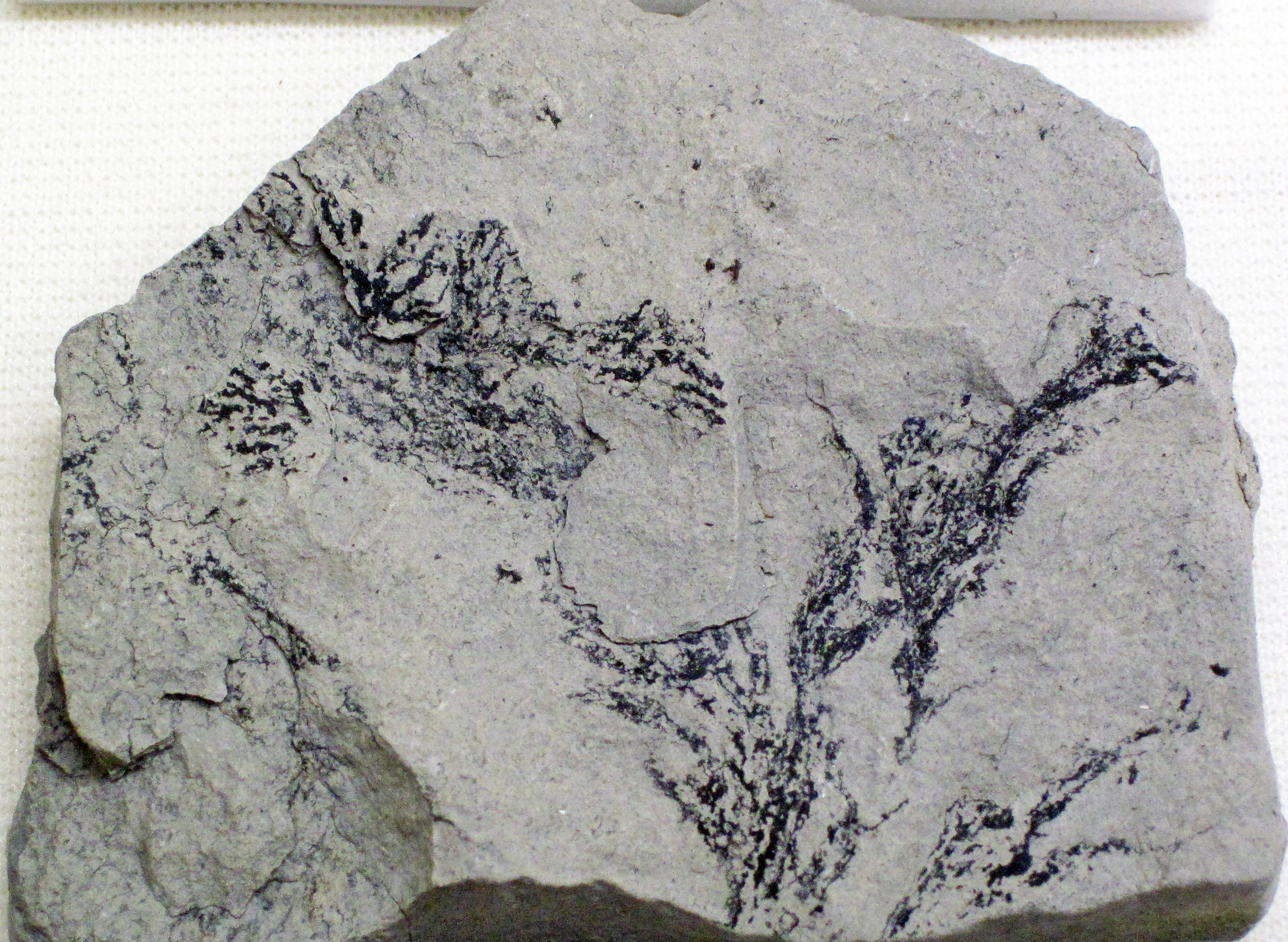
- Fossil red algae on Salem Limestone from Kentucky
- Type: Formation
- Unit of: Sanders Group, Meramec Group
- Underlies: St. Louis Limestone
- Overlies: Harrodsburg Limestone Warsaw Formation

Lithology
- Primary: Limestone

Location
- Region: Illinois, Indiana, Kentucky, and Missouri
- Country: United States

Type section
- Named for: Salem, Washington County, Indiana

The Salem Formation is a geologic formation in Illinois, Indiana, Kentucky, and Missouri. It preserves fossils dating back to the Mississippian subperiod. This formation is quarried and used as a building material, known as "Indiana limestone", also called Bedford limestone.

== See also ==
- List of fossiliferous stratigraphic units in Illinois
- List of fossiliferous stratigraphic units in Indiana
- List of fossiliferous stratigraphic units in Kentucky
- List of fossiliferous stratigraphic units in Missouri
