= Harrodsburg Limestone =

Geologic formation in Indiana, United States

- Stratigraphic range: Mississippian
- Type: Formation
- Unit of: Sanders Group
- Underlies: Salem Limestone
- Overlies: Muldraugh Formation and Ramp Creek Formation

Location
- Region: Indiana, Kentucky
- Country: United States

Type section
- Named for: Harrodsburg, Indiana
- Named by: T. C. Hopkins and C. E. Siebenthal in 1897

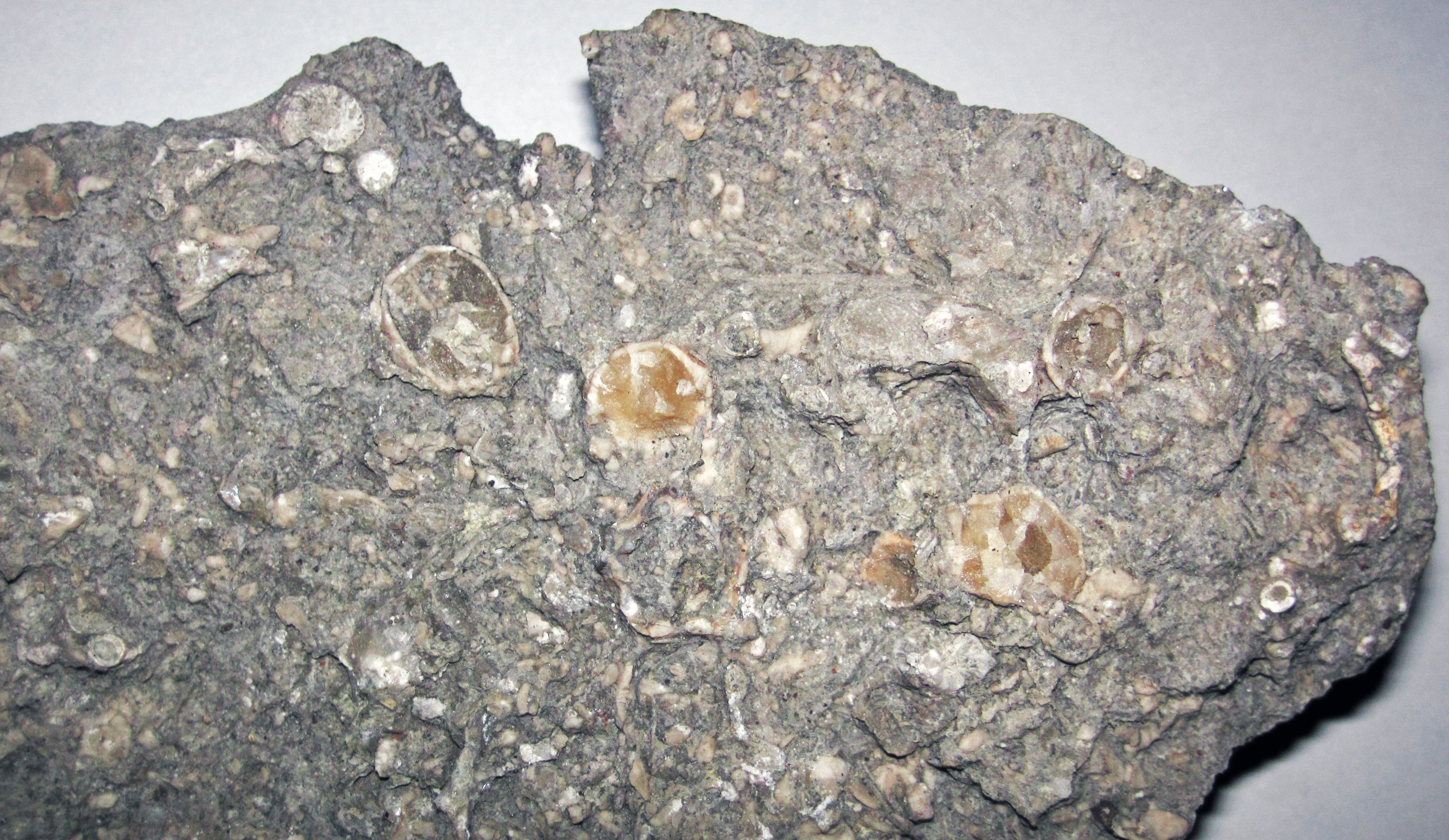
Fossiliferous Harrodsburg Limestone from Indiana

The Harrodsburg Limestone is a geologic formation, a member of the Sanders Group of Indiana Limestone, of Mississippian age. It was named for Harrodsburg in southern Monroe County, Indiana by T. C. Hopkins and C. E. Siebenthal ("The Bedford Oolitic Limestone of Indiana" - 1897). It is made up primarily of calcarenite and calcirudite. It also may include some beds of dolomite and shale.

Harrodsburg Limestone is found throughout the part of the Illinois Basin running through southern Indiana.

== See also ==
- List of fossiliferous stratigraphic units in Indiana
- List of fossiliferous stratigraphic units in Kentucky
