= McMillan Formation =

Geologic formation in Ohio, Kentucky and Indiana

- Stratigraphic range: Katian
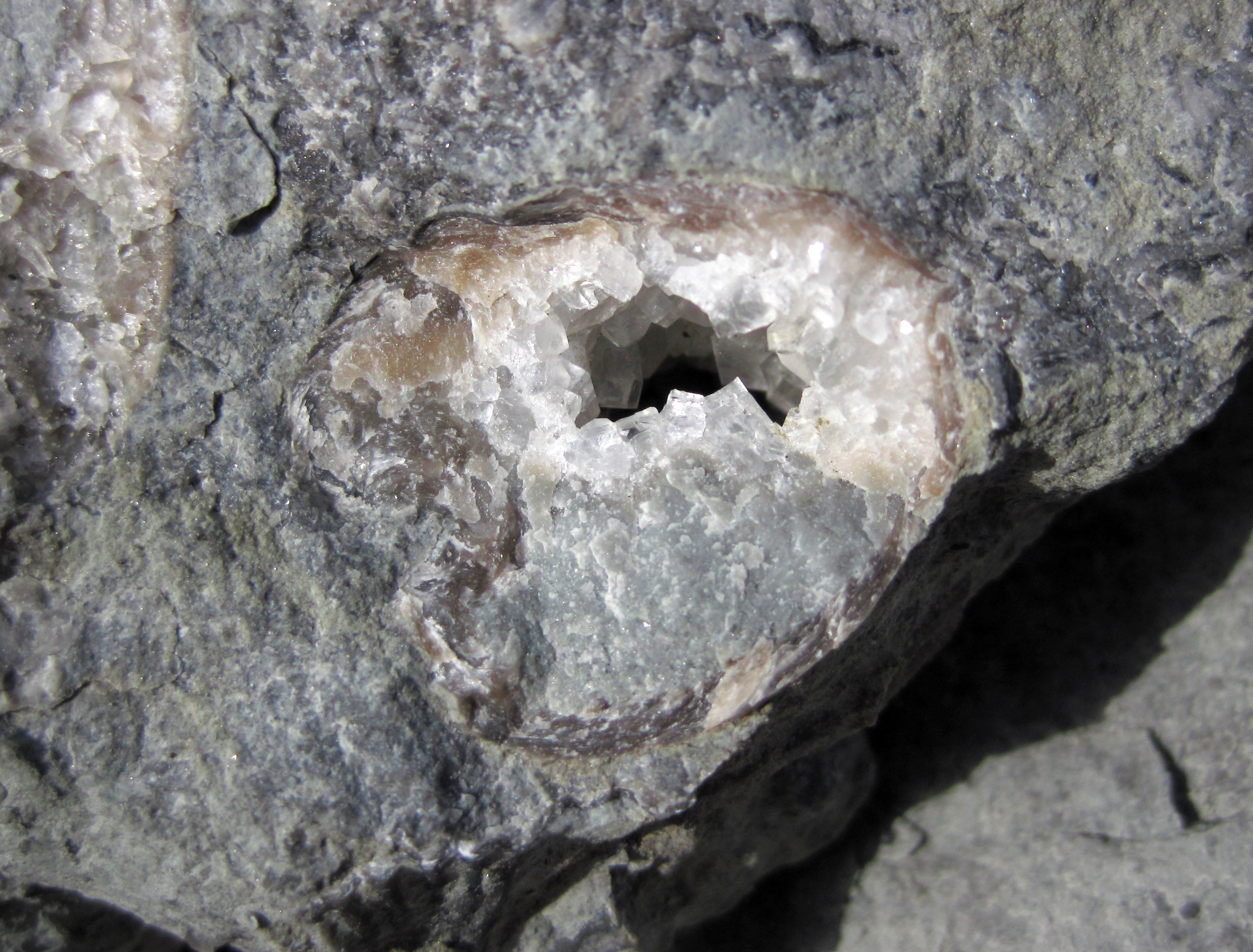
- Geopetal structure in limestone of the Corryville Member, McMillan Formation
- Type: Formation
- Sub-units: Bellevue Limestone, Corryville Member

Location
- Region: Ohio, Kentucky, Indiana
- Country: United States

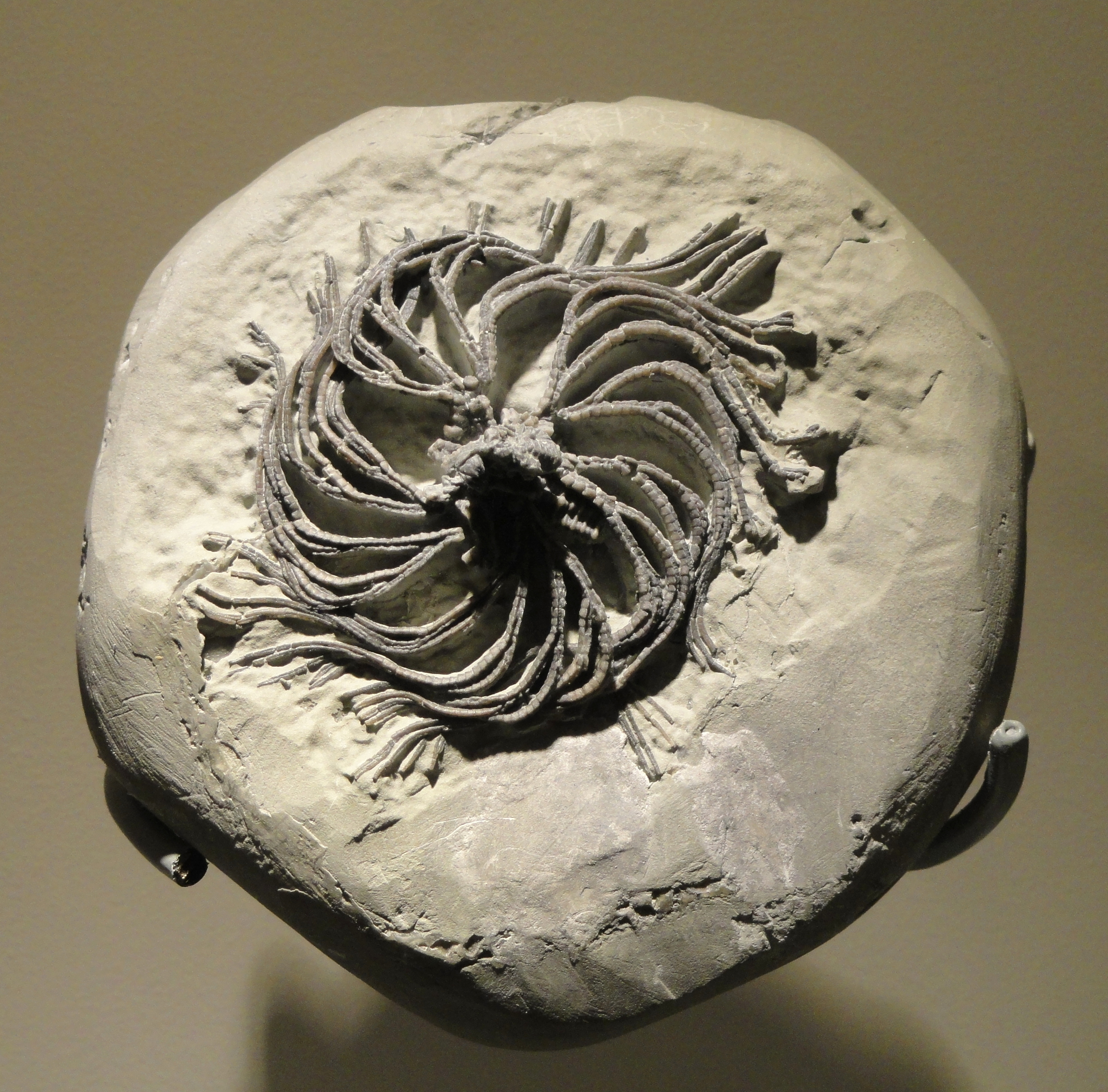
Fossil from the McMillan Formation (Ohio)

The McMillan Formation is a geologic formation in Ohio, Kentucky and Indiana. It preserves fossils dating back to the Ordovician period.

== See also ==
- List of fossiliferous stratigraphic units in Ohio
