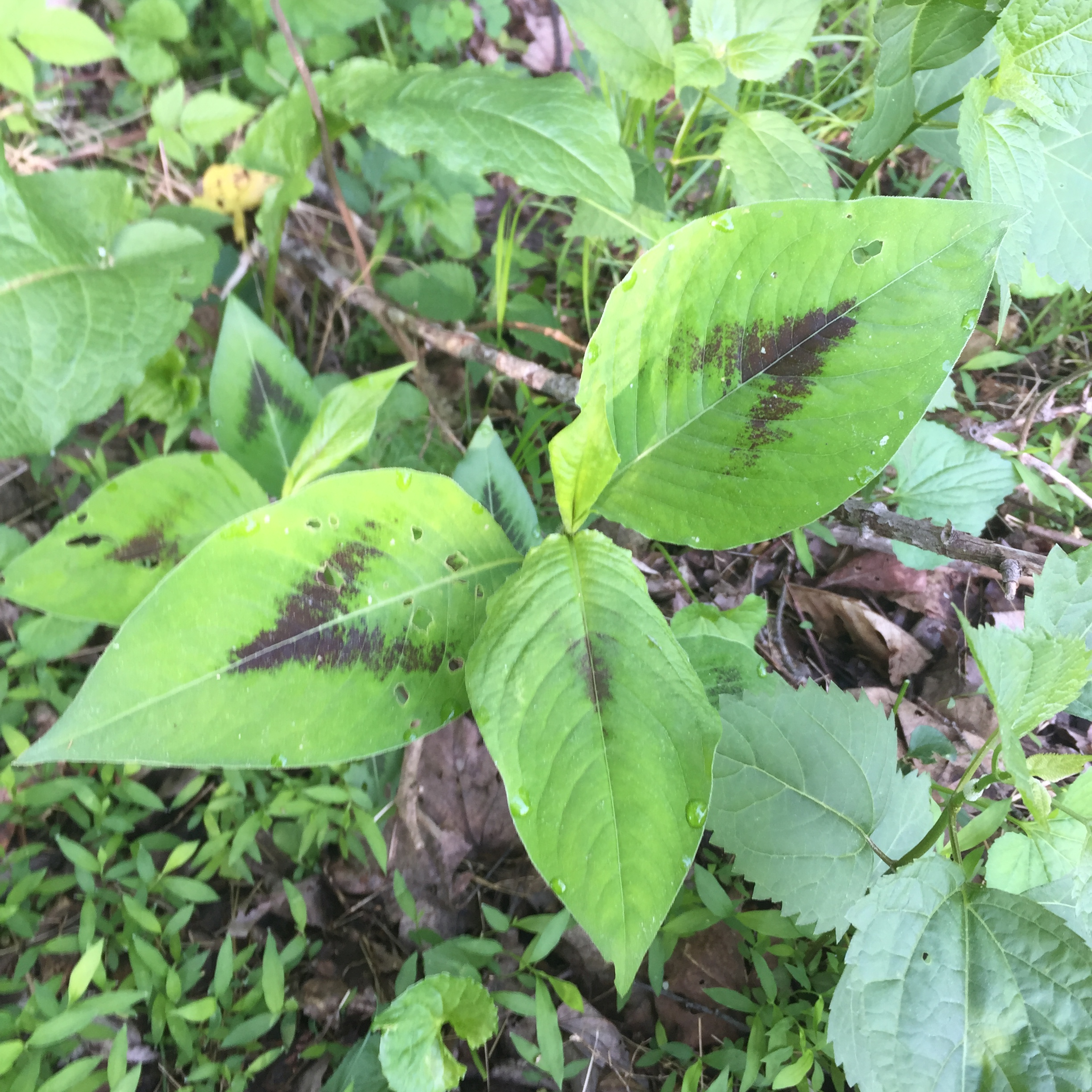

Conservation status
- Secure (NatureServe)

Scientific classification
- Kingdom: Plantae
- Clade: Embryophytes
- Clade: Tracheophytes
- Clade: Angiosperms
- Clade: Eudicots
- Order: Caryophyllales
- Family: Polygonaceae
- Genus: Persicaria
- Species: P. virginiana

Binomial name
- Persicaria virginiana (L.) Gaertn.
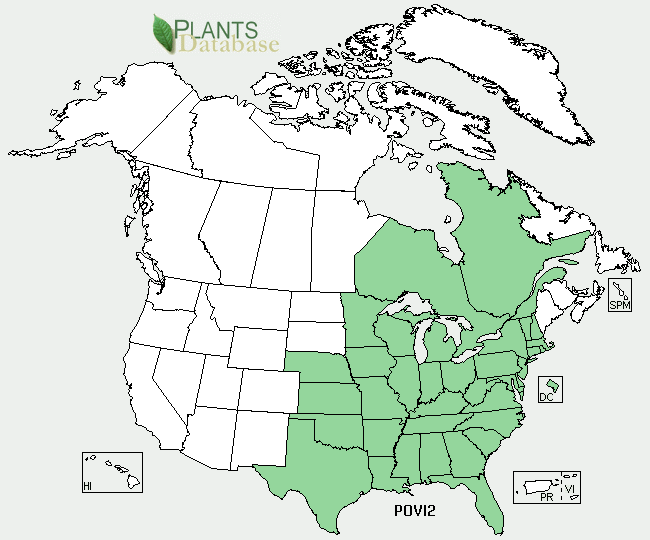
- Range within North America

Synonyms
- Polygonum virginianum L. 1753; Antenoron virginianum (L.) Roberty & Vautier; Tovara virginiana (L.) Raf.

= Persicaria virginiana =

Species of flowering plant in the knotweed family

Persicaria virginiana, also called jumpseed, Virginia knotweed or woodland knotweed is a North American species of smartweed within the buckwheat family. It is unusual as a shade-tolerant member of a mostly sun-loving genus. Jumpseed is a perennial, named for its seeds which can "jump" several feet when a ripe seedpod is disturbed.

Persicaria virginiana blooms in midsummer to late summer/early fall. It has a stalk of small white flowers.

== Description ==
Like other Persicaria, jumpseed has alternate leaves, with fine-hairy stipular sheaths (ocrea) with bristle-fringed edges which often turn brownish. Flowers, widely spaced along slender stalks, are white to greenish-white, rarely pink-tinged, and fruiting flowers have two downward-pointing hook-tipped styles. Persicaria virginiana is easily distinguished from most other Persicaria species by its much larger, more oval-shaped leaves, although a few species also have large leaves. It sometimes has a chevron-shaped marking on the leaves; often a single plant will have this marking on some leaves but not others.

Cultivars and naturalized populations from cultivation show much greater variation than wild-type plants, sometimes having variegation or have more involved red patterning, and sometimes having red or pink flowers.

== Distribution and habitat ==
Persicaria virginiana has a wide native range throughout most of eastern North America (from Ontario and Quebec, south to Florida, and west as far as Texas, Nebraska, and Minnesota/), as well as Japan and the Himalayas.

It naturally occurs in full to partial shade, on riverbanks, woods, cliffs, and rocks.

== Cultivation ==
Many variegated cultivars exist including 'Variegata' and 'Painter's Palette'. The cultivated plant prefers medium to moist soil and full sun to part shade.
