= Breathitt Formation =

Geological formation in Kentucky, USA

- Stratigraphic range: Early to Middle Pennsylvanian
- Type: Sedimentary

Location
- Region: Kentucky (extending into northern Tennessee and southwestern West Virginia)
- Country: United States

Type section
- Named for: Breathitt County, Kentucky
- Named by: Marius R. Campbell (1898)

The Breathitt Formation is a geologic formation in Kentucky which preserves fossils dating back to the Pennsylvanian period.

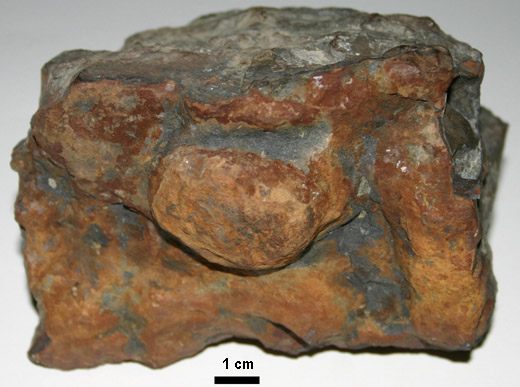
Ironstone from the Breathitt Formation along Interstate 64 in Kentucky

== See also ==
- List of fossiliferous stratigraphic units in Kentucky
