= Corniferous Formation =

Geologic formation in Michigan, US

- Stratigraphic range: Devonian
- Type: Formation

Location
- Region: Michigan
- Country: United States

The Corniferous Formation is a geologic formation in Michigan. It preserves fossils dating back to the Devonian period.
