= St. Louis Limestone =

Mississippian period geologic formation in the Midwest United States

- Stratigraphic range: Mississippian Sub-period
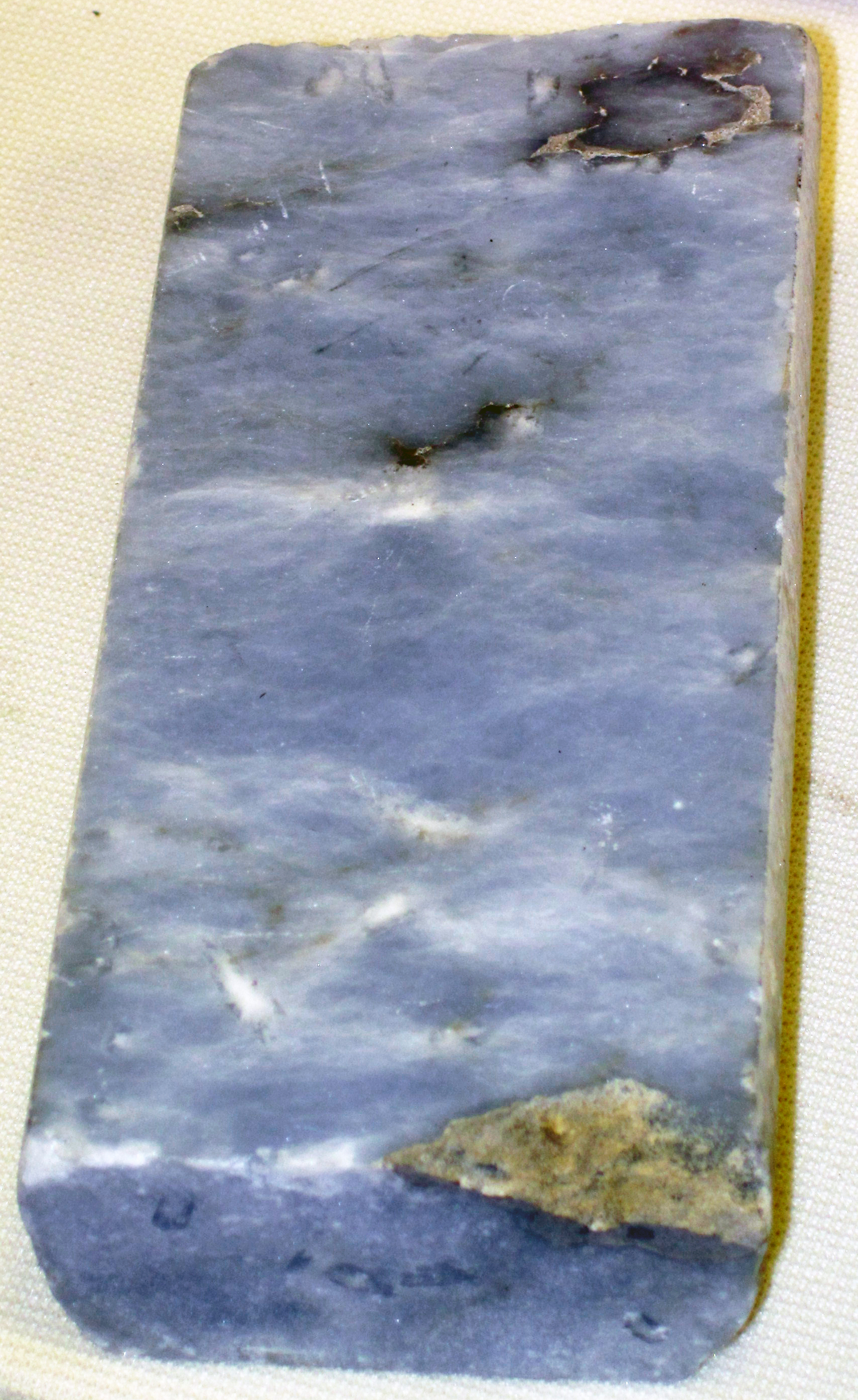
- Rock anhydrite (St. Louis Limestone; subsurface gypsum mine in Martin County, Indiana)
- Type: Geological formation
- Unit of: Blue River Group
- Sub-units: Dover Chert, Horse Cave Member, Sisson Member
- Underlies: Ste. Genevieve Limestone
- Overlies: Salem Formation
- Thickness: up to 100 feet (30 m)

Lithology
- Primary: Limestone
- Other: Shale, chert

Location
- Region: Illinois, Indiana, Tennessee, Kentucky and Missouri
- Country: United States

Type section
- Named for: St. Louis, Missouri
- Named by: Englemann
- Year defined: 1847

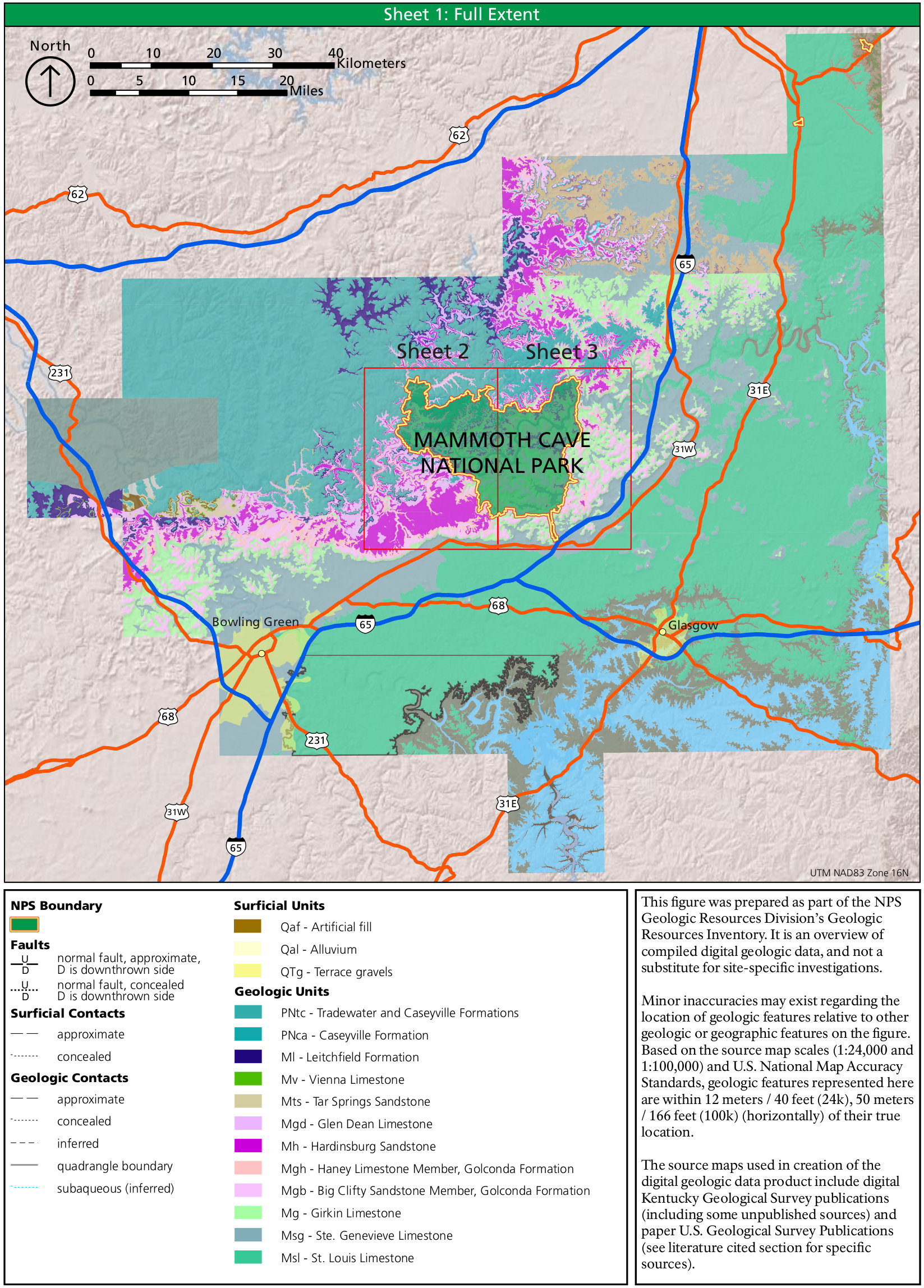
Geological map of Mammoth Cave National Park, incl. St. Louis Limestone

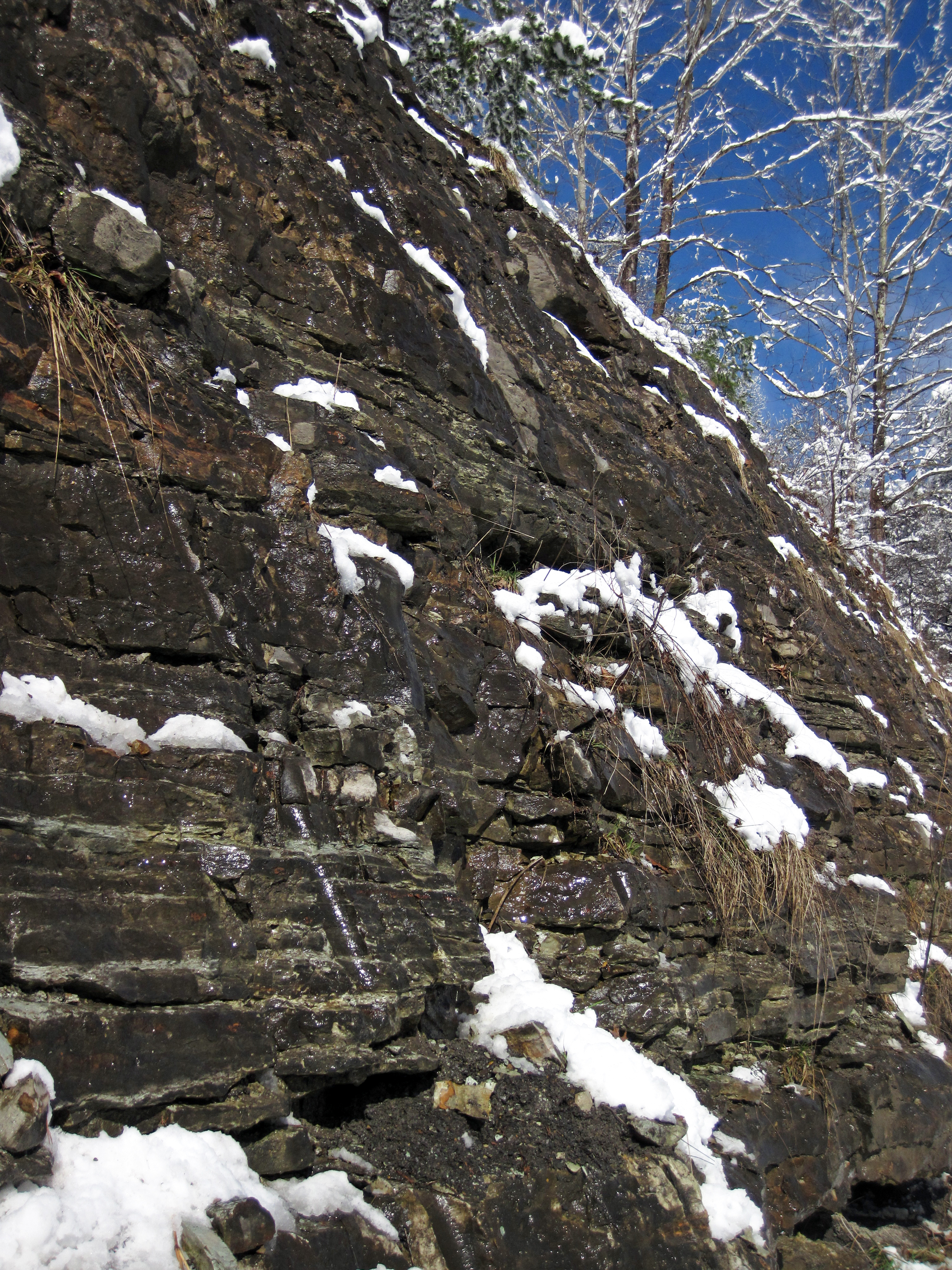
Outcrops of the St. Louis Limestone near Frenchburg, Kentucky

The St. Louis Limestone is a large geologic formation covering a wide area of the midwest of the United States. It is named after an exposure at St. Louis, Missouri. It consists of sedimentary limestone with scattered chert beds, including the heavily chertified Lost River Chert Bed in the Horse Cave Member. It is exposed at the surface through western Kentucky and Middle Tennessee, including the city of Clarksville, Tennessee. The limestone deposit is Mississippian in age, in the Meramecian series, roughly 330-340 million years old.

Fossils commonly found in the St. Louis include the rugosan corals Lithostrotion and Lithostrotionella and the bryozoan Fenestrellina.

== See also ==
- List of types of limestone
