= Borden Formation =

Mississippian period geologic formation in Appalachia and Midwest United States

- Stratigraphic range: Mississippian
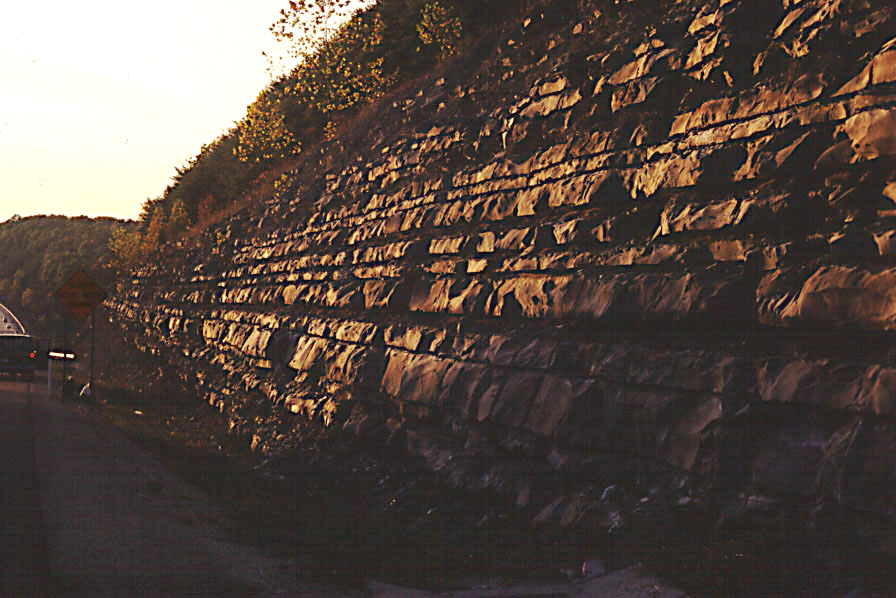
- Turbidites of Farmers Member of Borden Formation at mile marker 135, Interstate 64, Kentucky
- Type: Sedimentary
- Sub-units: Kentucky: New Providence Shale; Kenwood Siltstone; Nancy Holtsclaw Siltstone; Muldraugh, Farmers, Nada; Cowbell; Renfro; Indiana: Edwardsville Formation; New Providence Shale; Spickert Knob Formation
- Thickness: Kentucky: 0–200 m (0–656 ft)

Lithology
- Primary: Shale, siltstone, sandstone
- Other: Limestone

Location
- Region: Kentucky, Indiana, Illinois, Ohio, West Virginia, Tennessee
- Country: United States
- Extent: Cincinnati Arch, Appalachian Basin, Illinois Basin

Type section
- Named for: Borden, Clark County, Indiana
- Named by: Cummings
- Year defined: 1922

The Mississippian Borden Group (sometimes Borden Formation) is a mapped bedrock unit in Kentucky, Indiana, Illinois, Ohio, West Virginia, and Tennessee. It has many members, which has led some geologists to consider it a group (for example in Indiana) rather than a formation (for example in Kentucky).

== Fossils ==
- Scyphozoans: Conularia sp. (from Borden Formation), Paraconularia sp. (from Coral Ridge Member, New Providence Shale)
- Hexactinellid Sponges (from Muldraugh Formation)
- Brachiopods: Orthotetes keokuk (from Borden Formation), Orbiculoidea (from Coral Ridge Member, New Providence Shale)
- Trilobite: Phillibole conkini (Coral Ridge Member, New Providence Formation, Borden Group)
- Cephalopods: Cantabricanites greenei, Polaricyclus ballardensis, Winchelloceras knappi (all from Coral Ridge Member, New Providence Formation, Borden Group), Muenstroceras oweni, M. parallelum, Kazakhstania colubrella, Imitoceras ixion, Masonoceras kentuckiense, Merocanites drostei, Dzhaprakoceras sp., Polaricyclus bordenensis, Winchelloceras allei (all from Nada and Cowbell Members)
- Crinoids: Pachyocrinus aequalis (from Muldraugh Mbr.), Gilmocrinus kentuckyensis (from Muldraugh Mbr.), Rhodocrinites barrisi divergens, Gilbertsocrinus tuberculosus, Gilbertsocrinus typus, Actinocrinites eximius, Actinocrinites scitulus, Blairocrinus protuberatus, Steganocrinus, Uperocrinus pyriformis, Uperocrinus acuminatus, Eretmocrinus cloelia, Macrocrinus konincki, Dorycrinus quinquelobus, Aorocrinus nodulus, Agaricocrinus planoconvexus, Agaricocrinus inflatus, Dichocrinuspocillum Dichocrinus, Paradichocrinus liratus, Platycrinites glyptus, Platycrinites planus, Platycrinities spinifer, Cyathocrinites iowensis, Barycrinus spurious, Costalocrinus cornutus, Meniscocrinus, Pellecrinus obuncus, Atelestocrinus kentuckyensis, Holcocrinus spinobrachiatus, Blothrocrinus swallovi, Coeliocrinus subspinosus, Decadocrinus scalaris, Taxocrinus, Synbathocrinus dentatus, Halysiocrinus dactylus (from Nada Mbr.).
- Blastoids: Granatocrinus kentuckyensis (from New Providence Shale)

A rare soft-bodied fossil that was recovered from the Farmers Member of the Borden Formation in northeastern Kentucky was interpreted as a chondrophorine float (an internal anatomical feature).

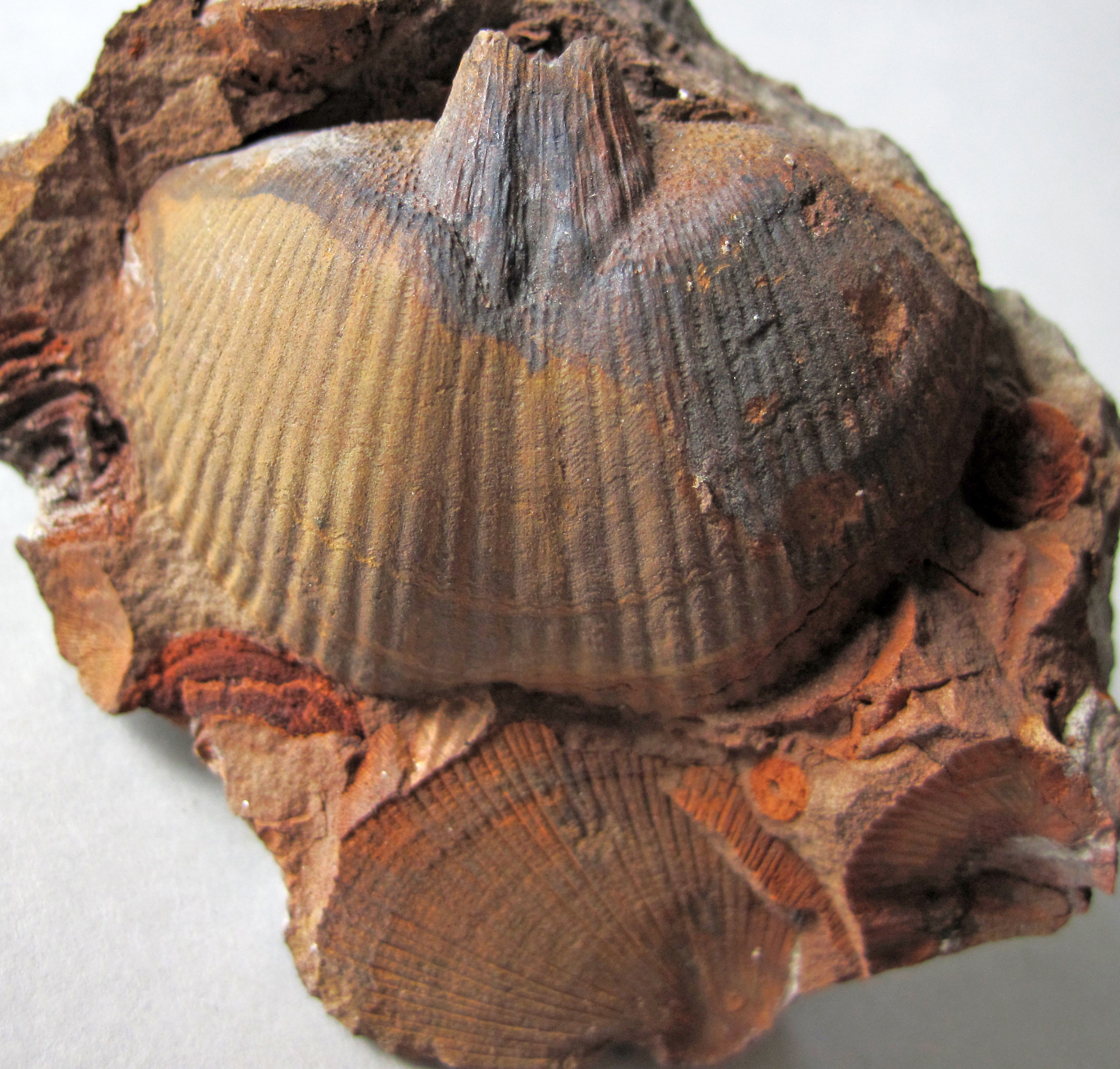
Fossil brachiopods (Rhynchonelliformea) in ironstone concretion (Nancy Member)

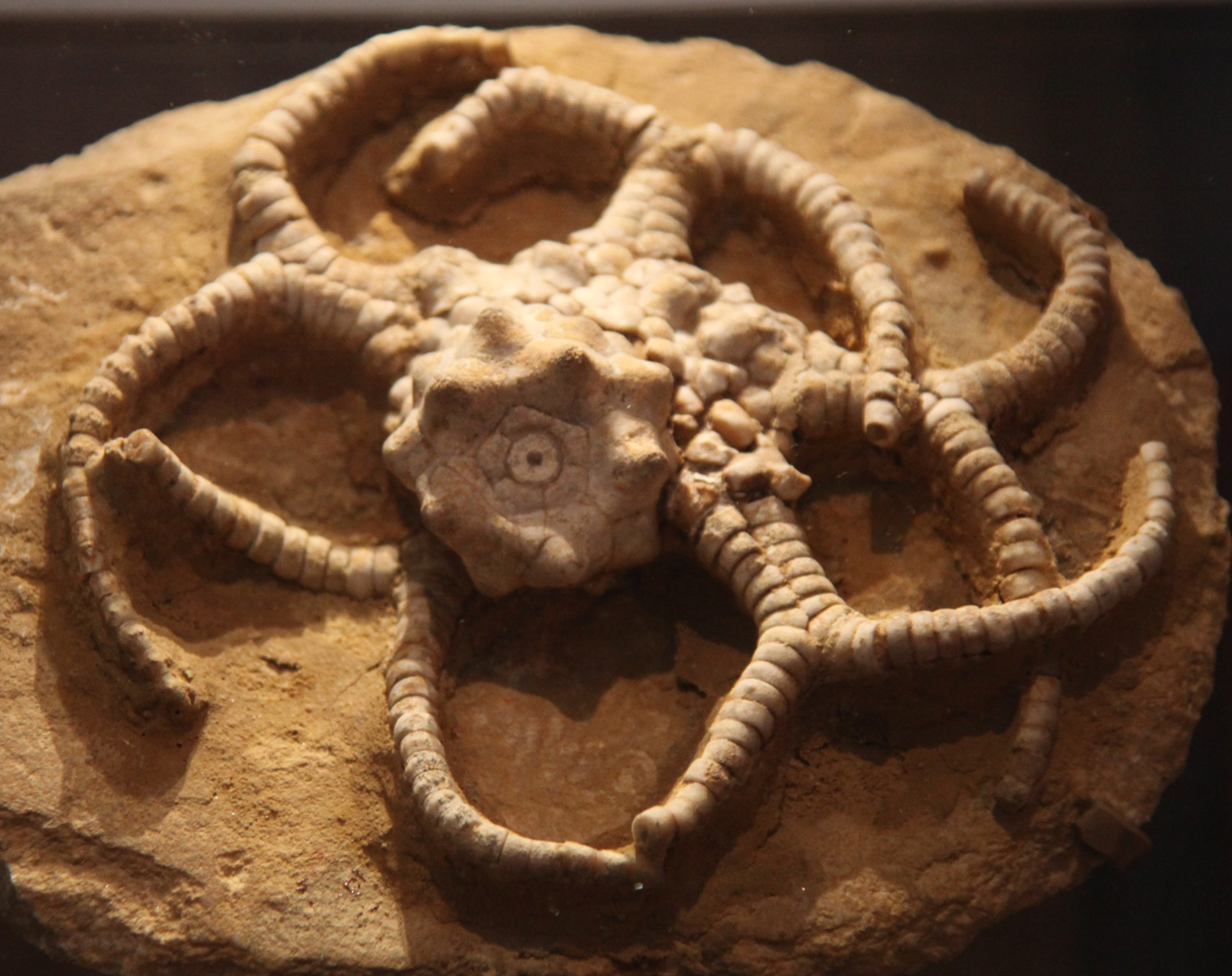
Gilbertsocrinus typus, an extinct crinoid from the Borden Formation

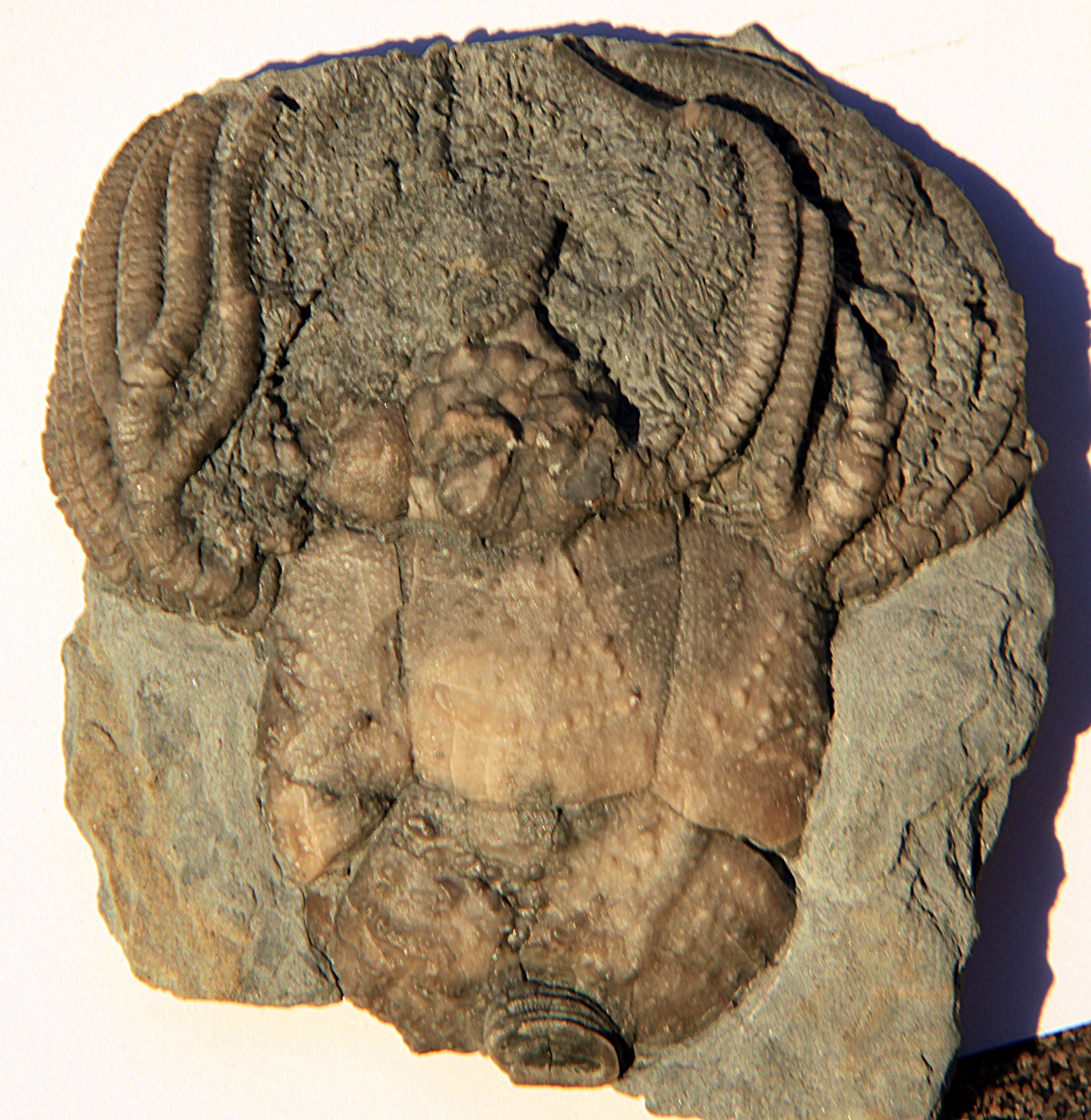
Platycrinites hemisphericus, another crinoid

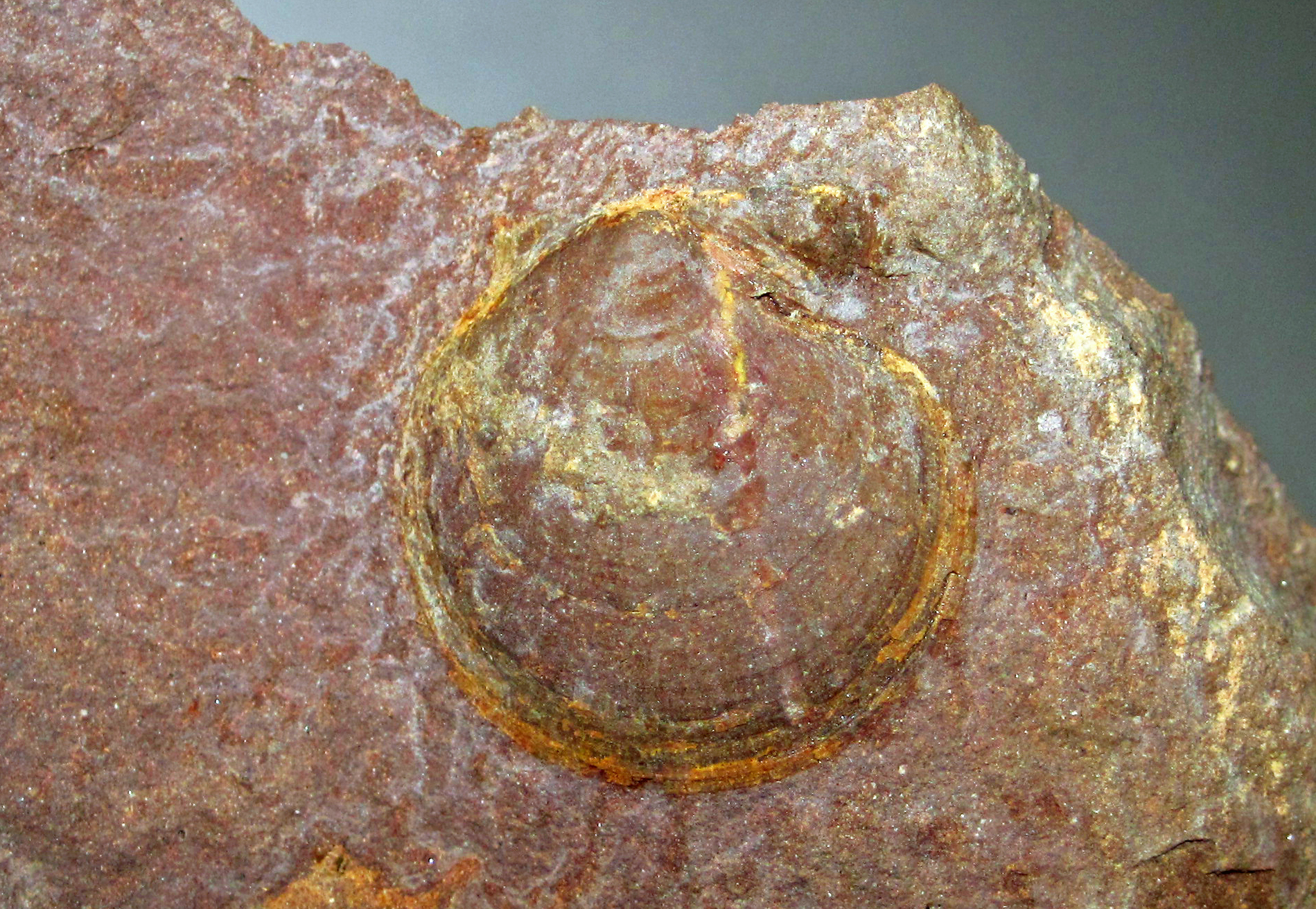
Fossil scallop in ironstone concretion (Nancy Member)

== Trace fossils ==
Zoophycos is present in the turbidites of the Farmers Member of the Borden Formation in Kentucky.

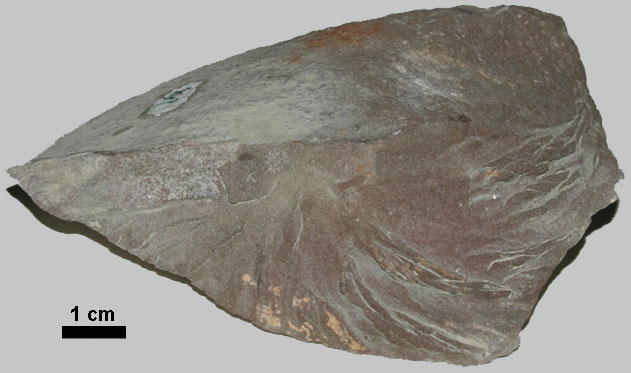
Zoophycos from turbidites of Farmers Member of Borden Formation at mile marker 135, I-64, Kentucky

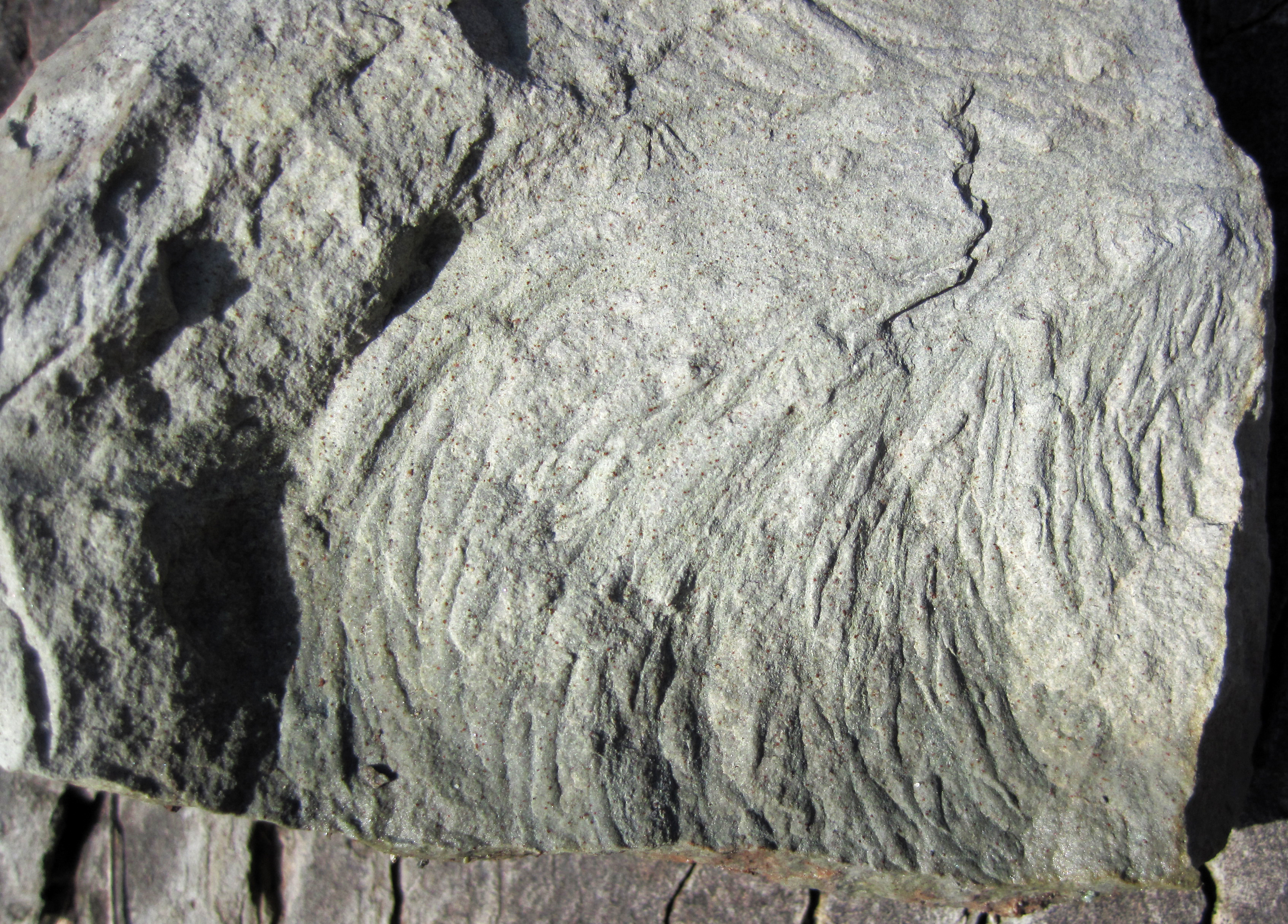
Another Zoophycos trace fossil from Kentucky

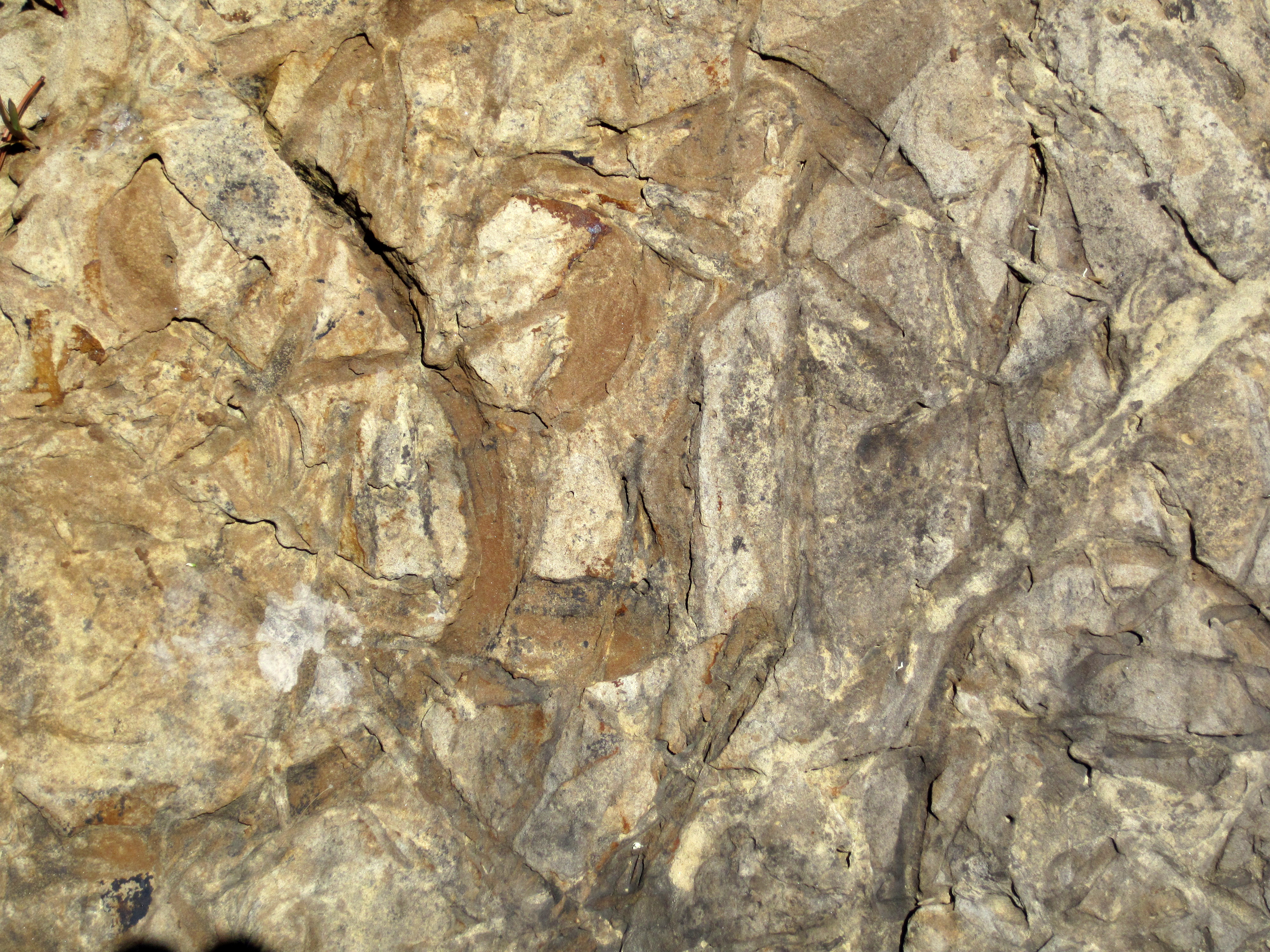
Trace fossils in sandstone (Henley Member)

== Stratigraphy ==
There are three members of the Borden Group in Indiana.

=== Edwardsville Formation ===
Edwardsville Formation
- Stratigraphic range: Mississippian
- Type: Formation
- Unit of: Borden Group
- Underlies: Muldraugh Formation and Ramp Creek Formation
- Overlies: Spickert Knob Formation

Location
- Region: Indiana
- Country: United States

The Edwardsville Formation is a geological structure in the Borden Group, of the Lower Mississippian sub system, (Osagean, late Tournaisian). Crinoids fossils can be found in the formation.

=== New Providence Shale ===
New Providence Shale
- Stratigraphic range: Mississippian
- Type: Formation
- Unit of: Borden Group
- Underlies: Spickert Knob Formation
- Overlies: Coldwater Shale and Rockford Limestone

Location
- Region: Indiana
- Country: United States

The New Providence Shale is a geologic formation in Indiana. It is a basal clay-shale geologic formation in Indiana named by Charles Butts and William W. Borden in the 1874 after New Providence, Indiana (now Borden).

=== Spickert Knob Formation ===
Spickert Knob Formation
- Stratigraphic range: Mississippian
- Type: Formation
- Unit of: Borden Group
- Underlies: Edwardsville Formation
- Overlies: New Providence Shale

Location
- Region: Indiana
- Country: United States

The Spickert Knob Formation is a geologic formation in Indiana.

== Sources ==
- Hill, John R. (1986). "Where to Go & What to See: Places of Geologic Interest in Indiana". Rocks & Minerals. 61 (3): 164–167. doi:10.1080/00357529.1986.11768458. ISSN 0035-7529.
- Rexroad, Carl Buckner; Lane, Norman Gary (1984). Spickert Knob Formation (new), Borden Group, in Indiana (PDF). Bloomington, Indiana: Indiana Department of Conservation Geological Survey.
- Stockdale, Paris B. (1986). Lower Mississippian Rocks of the East-Central Interior. Geological Society of America Special Paper. Geological Society of America. ISBN 978-0-8137-2022-7.
- Generalized Stratigraphic Column of Indiana Bedrock
