= Corryville Formation =

Fossil-rich geological formation

- Stratigraphic range: Ordovician
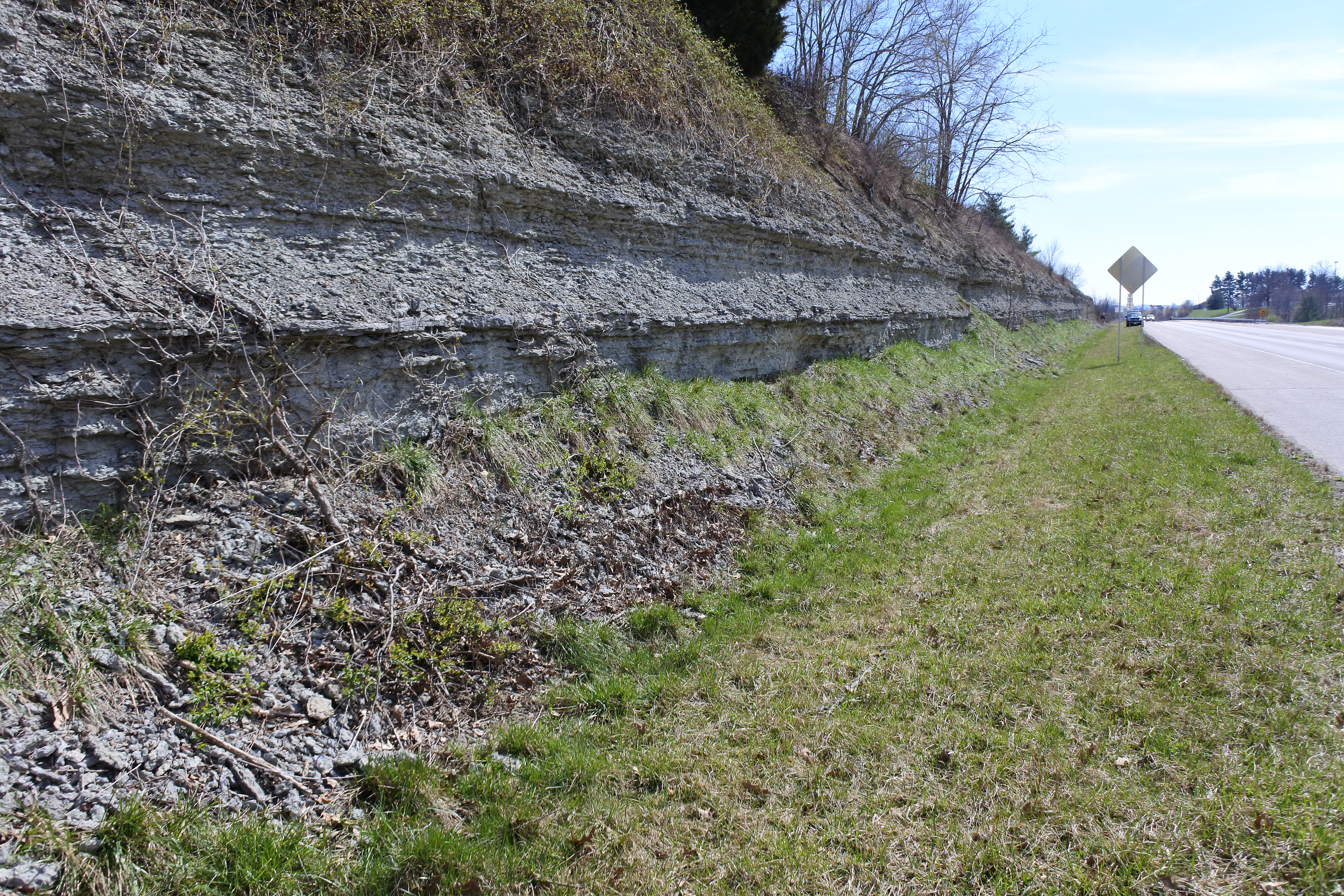
- Corryville Formation (Upper Ordovician, Katian) exposed in Maysville, Kentucky.
- Type: Formation

Location
- Region: Ohio, Kentucky
- Country: United States

The Corryville Formation is a geologic formation in Ohio and Kentucky. It preserves fossils dating back to the Ordovician period.

== See also ==
- List of fossiliferous stratigraphic units in Ohio
