= Ste. Genevieve Limestone =

Geologic formation in Missouri, U.S.

- Stratigraphic range: Mississippian Sub-period
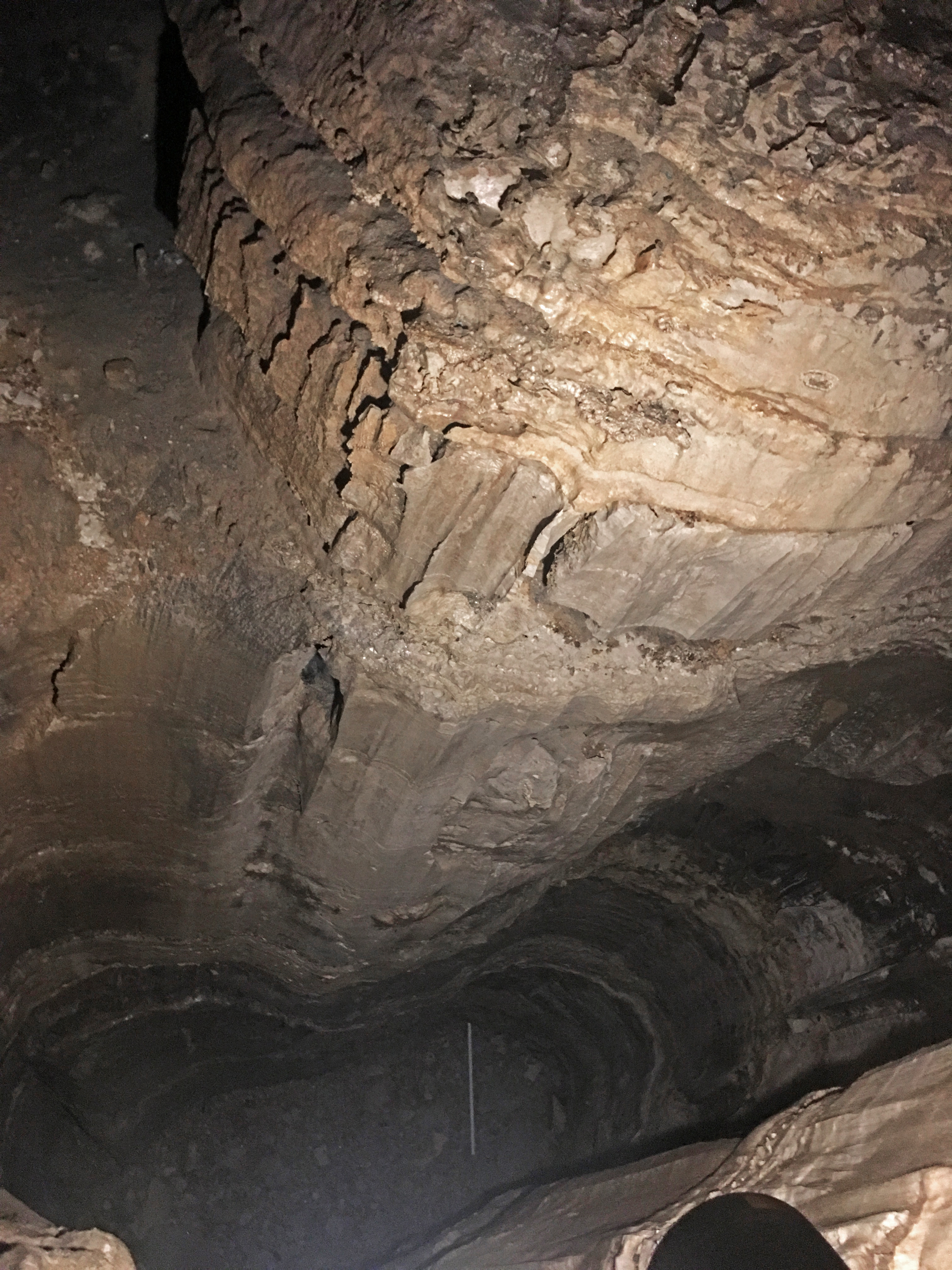
- Ste. Genevieve Limestone, lining Sidesaddle Pit (Black Snake Avenue, Mammoth Cave, Kentucky)
- Type: Geological formation
- Unit of: Blue River Group
- Sub-units: Fredonia Member
- Underlies: Aux Vases Sandstone and Paoli Limestone
- Overlies: St. Louis Limestone
- Thickness: up to 85 feet (26 m)

Lithology
- Primary: Limestone
- Other: Sandstone, chert

Location
- Region: Missouri, Kentucky, Illinois, Indiana
- Country: United States

Type section
- Named for: Ste. Genevieve, Missouri
- Named by: Shumard
- Year defined: 1859

The Ste. Genevieve Limestone is a geologic formation named for Ste. Genevieve, Missouri where it is exposed and was first described. It is a thick-bedded limestone that overlies the St. Louis Limestone. Both are Mississippian in age. The St. Louis Limestone is Meramecian and the Ste. Genevieve is the base of the Chesterian series.

It is a primary producer in the Illinois Basin and has produced commercial oil and gas in Warren County, Kentucky.

== See also ==
- List of types of limestone
