= Pope Mega Group =

Geologic unit found in the Illinois Basin, U.S.

- Stratigraphic range: Carboniferous
- Type: Geological group
- Sub-units: Grove Church Shale; Kincaid; Goreville Limestone; Cave Hill Shale; Negli Creek Limestone; Degonia Sandstone; Clore Limestone; Ford Station Limestone; Tygett Sandstone; Cora Limestone; Palestine Sandstone; Menard Limestone; Allard Limestone; Scottsburg Limestone; Walche Limestone; Waltersburg Formation; Vienna Limestone; Tar Springs Sandstone; Glen Dean Formation; Hardinsburg Formation; Haney Formation; Fraileys Formation; Big Clifty Member; Beech Creek Formation; Cypress Formation; Ridenhower Formation; Reelsville Member; Sample Member; Beaver Bend Member; Bethel Formation
- Overlies: Mammoth Cave Group

Lithology
- Primary: Sandstone, Limestone, Shale

Location
- Region: Illinois Basin
- Country: United States of America

The Pope Mega Group is a geologic unit found in the Illinois Basin of southern Illinois, southwestern Indiana, and western Kentucky. In Indiana and Kentucky its equitant is the Buffalo Wallow Group. This unit grades from sandstones at its base into mix of limestones and sandstone and then a shale at its top. In Southern Illinois oil wells are drilled into the Tar Springs formation.

== Stratigraphy ==
=== Kinkaid Formation ===
Also known at the Kinkaid Limestone, this unit is made up of several smaller members. This unit ranges from 0' - 230 ' thick. The Grove Church Shale is at the top, followed by Members, Goreville Limestone, Cave Hill Shale, and Negli Creek Limestone.

=== Tobinsport Formation ===
A formation in Illinois containing 4 members that are linked to other formations in the Upper Pope Group. The Negli Creek Limestone of the Kinkaid formation to the west. Mt. Pleasant Sandstone, Bristow Sandstone, and Siberia Limestone. The Siberia is a thin tongue of the Menard formation.

=== Degonia Formation ===
This sandstone unit is 0-150' thick.

=== Clore Formation ===
This unit is 0-150’ thick. Its units include the Ford Station Limestone, Tygett Sandstone and Cora Limestone Members.

=== Palestine Formation ===
This sandstone unit is 0-120' thick.

=== Menard Formation ===
The Menard Limestone is a geologic formation in the Illinois Basin of southern Illinois, southwestern Indiana, and western Kentucky.

The type section of both the Walche Limestone Member and the Scottsburg Limestone Member are exposures in Walche's Cut, a railway cutting on the Illinois Central Railroad.

=== Waltersburg Formation ===
This formation is 0-100’ thick.

=== Vienna Formation ===
This limestone unit is 0-60' thick

=== Tar Springs Formation ===
This sandstone unit is 0-150' thick. The Tar Springs consists of interbedded sandstone and shale, creating closed reservoirs within the sand. For this reason it is the largest oil producing formation in Illinois. Estimated to have accounted for more than 60% of the oil production in the state.

=== Glen Dean Formation ===
The Glen Dean Formation is a geologic formation in Illinois, Indiana and Kentucky. It preserves fossils dating back to the Carboniferous period.

=== Hardinsburg Formation ===
The Hardinsburg Formation is a geologic formation in Illinois, Indiana and Kentucky. It preserves fossils dating back to the Carboniferous period.

=== Haney Formation ===
The Haney Formation is a geologic formation in Illinois, Indiana and Kentucky. It preserves fossils dating back to the Carboniferous period.

=== Fraileys Formation ===
The Fraileys Formation or Fraileys Shale is a geologic formation in Illinois. It preserves fossils dating back to the Carboniferous period.

=== Beech Creek Formation ===
The Beech Creek Formation is a geologic formation in Illinois, Indiana and Kentucky. It preserves fossils dating back to the Carboniferous period.

=== Cypress Formation ===
The Cypress Formation is a geologic formation in Illinois, Indiana and Kentucky. It preserves fossils dating back to the Carboniferous period.

=== Ridenhower Formation ===
The Ridenhower Formation is a geologic formation in Illinois. It preserves fossils dating back to the Carboniferous period. It includes the Reelsville Member, Sample Member and Beaver Bend Member.

=== Bethel Formation ===
The Bethel Formation is a geologic formation in Illinois, Indiana and Kentucky. It preserves fossils dating back to the Carboniferous period.
