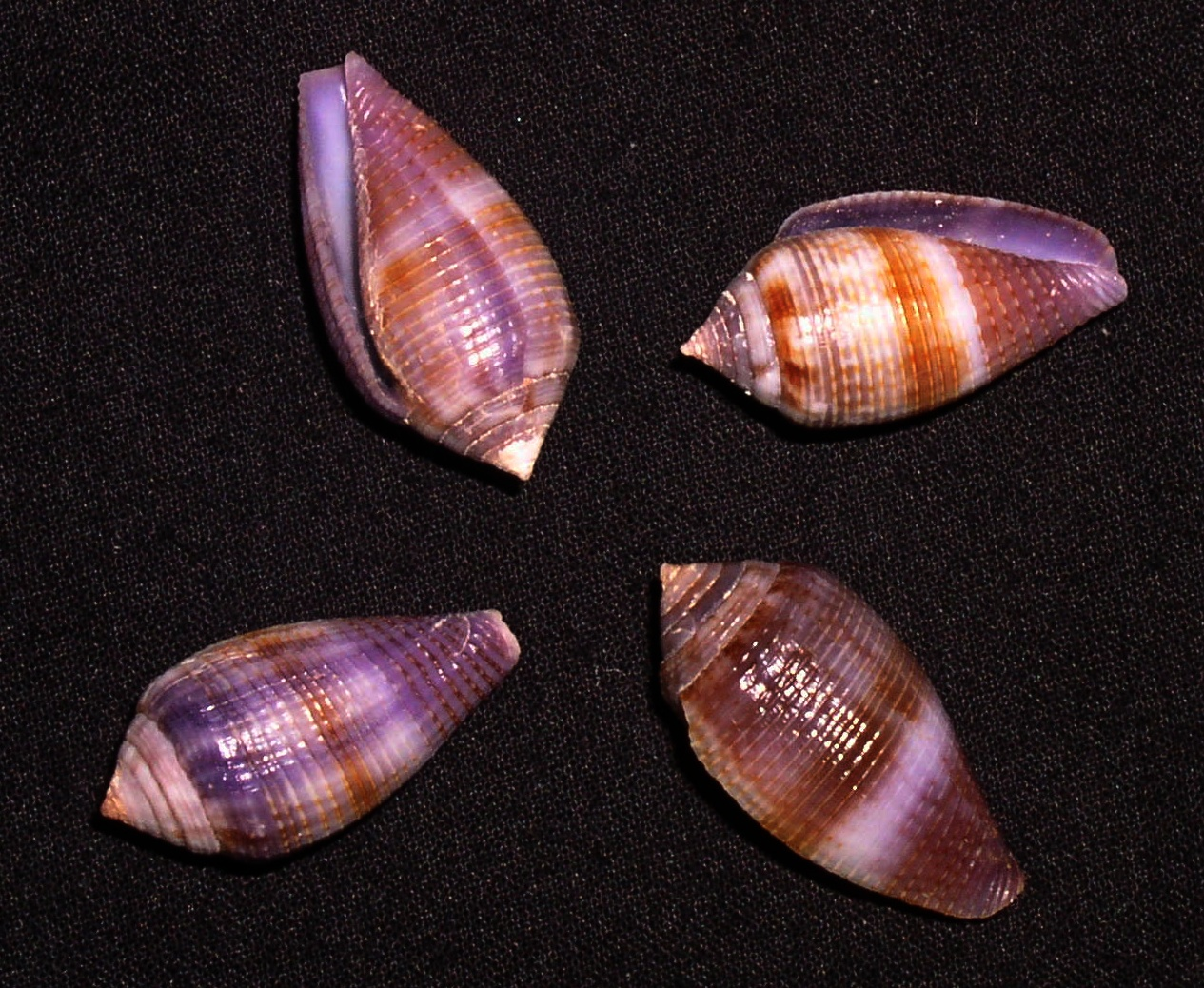
- Apertural view of shell of Conus glans (Hwass in Bruguière, 1792).

Scientific classification
- Kingdom: Animalia
- Phylum: Mollusca
- Class: Gastropoda
- Subclass: Caenogastropoda
- Order: Neogastropoda
- Family: Conidae
- Genus: Conus
- Subgenus: Leporiconus; Iredale, 1930

Type species
- Conus glans Hwass in Bruguière, 1792

Synonyms
- Leporiconus Iredale, 1930

= Conus (Leporiconus) =

Subgenus of gastropods

Leporiconus is a subgenus of sea snails, marine gastropod molluscs in the genus Conus, family Conidae, the cone snails and their allies.

In the latest classification of the family Conidae by Puillandre N., Duda T.F., Meyer C., Olivera B.M. & Bouchet P. (2015), Leporiconus has become a subgenus of Conus as Conus (Leporiconus) Iredale, 1930(type species: Conus glans Hwass in Bruguière, 1792) represented as Conus Linnaeus, 1758

== Distinguishing characteristics ==
The Tucker & Tenorio 2009 taxonomy distinguishes Leporiconus from Conus in the following ways:

- Genus Conus sensu stricto Linnaeus, 1758

Shell characters (living and fossil species)

The basic shell shape is conical to elongated conical, has a deep anal notch on the shoulder, a smooth periostracum and a small operculum. The shoulder of the shell is usually nodulose and the protoconch is usually multispiral. Markings often include the presence of tents except for black or white color variants, with the absence of spiral lines of minute tents and textile bars.

Radular tooth (not known for fossil species)

The radula has an elongated anterior section with serrations and a large exposed terminating cusp, a non-obvious waist, blade is either small or absent and has a short barb, and lacks a basal spur.

Geographical distribution

These species are found in the Indo-Pacific region.

Feeding habits

These species eat other gastropods including cones.

- Subgenus Leporiconus Iredale, 1930

Shell characters (living and fossil species)

The shell is subcylindrical to pyriform in shape (like a torpedo) with rounded to indistinct shoulders. The protoconch is multispiral. The shell is ornamented with two or more cords on the whorl tops, nodules which die out in the early whorls, and well developed and pustulose ridges on the body whorl. The anal notch is shallow. The anterior end of the shell is usually colored blue, purple or pink. The periostracum is smooth, and the operculum is small.

Radular tooth (not known for fossil species)

The anterior section of the radular tooth is roughly equal to the length of posterior section, and blade is long and is at least one-half the length of the anterior section. A basal spur is present, and the barb is short. The radular tooth has serrations, and a terminating cusp.

Geographical distribution

The species in this genus occur in the occur in the Indo-Pacific region.

Feeding habits

These cone snails are vermivorous, meaning that the cones prey on polychaete and eunicid worms.

== Species list ==
This list of species is based on the information in the World Register of Marine Species (WoRMS) list. Species within the genus Leporiconus include:

- Leporiconus coffeae (Gmelin, 1791): synonym of Conus coffeae Gmelin, 1791
- Leporiconus corallinus (Kiener, 1845): synonym of Conus corallinus Kiener, 1845
- Leporiconus cylindraceus (Broderip & G.B. Sowerby I, 1830): synonym of Conus cylindraceus Broderip & G. B. Sowerby I, 1830
- Leporiconus glans (Hwass in Bruguière, 1792): synonym of Conus glans Hwass in Bruguière, 1792
- Leporiconus granum (Röckel & Fischöder, 1985): synonym of Conus granum Röckel & Fischöder, 1985
- Leporiconus luteus (G.B. Sowerby I, 1833): synonym of Conus luteus G. B. Sowerby I, 1833
- Leporiconus mitratus (Hwass in Bruguière, 1792): synonym of Conus mitratus Hwass in Bruguière, 1792
- Leporiconus nucleus (Reeve, 1848): synonym of Conus nucleus Reeve, 1848
- Leporiconus tenuistriatus (G.B. Sowerby II, 1858): synonym of Conus tenuistriatus G. B. Sowerby II, 1858
