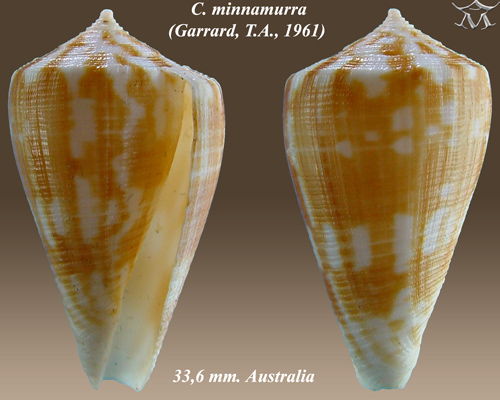
- Apertural and abapertural views of shell of Conus minnamurra (Garrard, T.A., 1961)

Scientific classification
- Kingdom: Animalia
- Phylum: Mollusca
- Class: Gastropoda
- Subclass: Caenogastropoda
- Order: Neogastropoda
- Family: Conidae
- Genus: Conus
- Subgenus: Eremiconus; Tucker & Tenorio, 2009

Type species
- Conus minnamurra (Garrard, 1961)

Synonyms
- Eremiconus Tucker & Tenorio, 2009

= Conus (Eremiconus) =

Subgenus of gastropods

Eremiconus is a subgenus of sea snails, marine gastropod mollusks in the genus Conus, family Conidae, the cone snails and their allies.

In the latest classification of the family Conidae by Puillandre N., Duda T.F., Meyer C., Olivera B.M. & Bouchet P. (2015), Eremiconus has become a subgenus of Conus as Conus (Eremiconus) represented as Conus Linnaeus, 1758

== Distinguishing characteristics ==
The Tucker & Tenorio 2009 taxonomy distinguishes Eremiconus from Conus in the following ways:

- Genus Conus sensu stricto Linnaeus, 1758

Shell characters (living and fossil species)

The basic shell shape is conical to elongated conical, has a deep anal notch on the shoulder, a smooth periostracum and a small operculum. The shoulder of the shell is usually nodulose and the protoconch is usually multispiral. Markings often include the presence of tents except for black or white color variants, with the absence of spiral lines of minute tents and textile bars.

Radular tooth (not known for fossil species)

The radula has an elongated anterior section with serrations and a large exposed terminating cusp, a non-obvious waist, blade is either small or absent and has a short barb, and lacks a basal spur.

Geographical distribution

These species are found in the Indo-Pacific region.

Feeding habits

These species eat other gastropods including cones.

- Subgenus Eremiconus Tucker & Tenorio, 2009

Shell characters (living and fossil species)

The shell is turbinate with a convex and scalariform spire. The protoconch is paucispiral with 1.5 whorls. The whorl tops have cords, but nodules are absent. Ridges or sulci reach the shoulder. The anal notch is shallow. The periostracum and operculum were not observed.

Radular tooth (not known for fossil species)

The radular tooth was no observed, and therefore its structure is unknown.

Geographical distribution

The only living species in this genus is endemic to Australia.

Feeding habits

Unknown.

== Species list ==
This list of species is based on the information in the World Register of Marine Species (WoRMS) list. Species within the genus Eremiconus include:

- Eremiconus albellus Röckel & Korn, 1990 : synonym of Conus (Eremiconus) albellus Röckel & Korn, 1990, represented as Conus albellus Röckel & Korn, 1990
- Eremiconus colmani Röckel & Korn, 1990 : synonym of Conus (Eremiconus) colmani Röckel & Korn, 1990 , represented as Conus colmani Röckel & Korn, 1990
- Eremiconus limpusi Röckel & Korn, 1990: synonym of Conus (Eremiconus) limpusi Röckel & Korn, 1990, represented as Conus limpusi Röckel & Korn, 1990
- Eremiconus lizardensis Crosse, 1865 : synonym of Conus (Eremiconus) lizardensis Crosse, 1865, represented as Conus lizardensis Crosse, 1865
- Eremiconus minnamurra (Garrard, 1961): synonym of Conus (Eremiconus) minnamurra (Garrard, 1961), represented as Conus minnamurra (Garrard, 1961)
