= Balvia =

Balvia Temporal range: Upper Devonian

Scientific classification
- Kingdom: Animalia
- Phylum: Mollusca
- Class: Cephalopoda
- Subclass: †Ammonoidea
- Order: †Goniatitida
- Family: †Prionoceratidae
- Subfamily: †Balviinae
- Genus: †Balvia

Subgenera
- see text

Genus of molluscs (fossil)

Balvia is an ammonoid cephalopod genus from the Upper Devonian belonging to the goniatitid family Prionoceratidae.

Balvia has a small, lenticular to subglobular shell with a punctate umbilicus, that is completely involute. Growth lines are fine, forward slanting, concavo-convex; indicate well developed ventrolateral salients and hyponomic sinus. Flanks have several weak constrictions, which usually swing forward at venter to form grooves bounding a median keel. The aperture may be modified.

Balvia was named by Dieter Korn in 1994 with the redescription of the type species, Gattendorfia globularis originally described by Schmidt in 1924. The genus was further divided into the subgenera B.(Balvia), B. (Mayneoceras), and B.(Kenseyoceras) by Becker in 1996.
