= Karagandoceratoidea =

Karagandoceratoidea Temporal range: Early Carboniferous

Scientific classification
- Kingdom: Animalia
- Phylum: Mollusca
- Class: Cephalopoda
- Subclass: †Ammonoidea
- Order: †Goniatitida
- Suborder: †Tornoceratina
- Superfamily: †Karagandoceratoidea; Librovich, 1957

Synonyms
- Karagandocerataceae

Extinct superfamily of molluscs

Karagandoceratoidea is an Early Carboniferous (Mississippian) superfamily within the ammonoid order, Goniatitida, said to contain the Karagandoceratidae and Prodromitidae.

== Analysis ==
Shells are discoidal to lenticular. Adult stages are oxygonic, having acute venters, or have distinct keels. The ventral lobe may be either bifurcate or trifurcate (two or three pronged) and there is a tendency to increase the number of elements ontogenetically in the suture.

== Taxonomic affinities ==
In the most recent classifications, W.M. Furnish, et al., 2009 and GONIAT theKaraganoceratoidea, is divided into the families Karagandoceratidae and Prodromitidae, with Karagandoceras, Bartzschiceras and Masonoceras included in the Karagandocertidae.

Previously, Deiter Korn (2006) included Karagandoceras along with Bartzschiceras and Masonoceras in the subfamily Karagandoceratinae which he included in the Prionoceratidae as part of the Prionocerataceae. Note retention of the—aceae ending. The Prodromitidae is included in the same superfamily.

Members of the Karagandoceratidae are probably derived from different members of the Prioceratidae and therefore is an artificial grouping. The Prodromitidae, with which it is included, has been placed in the Prolecanitidain other classifications.
