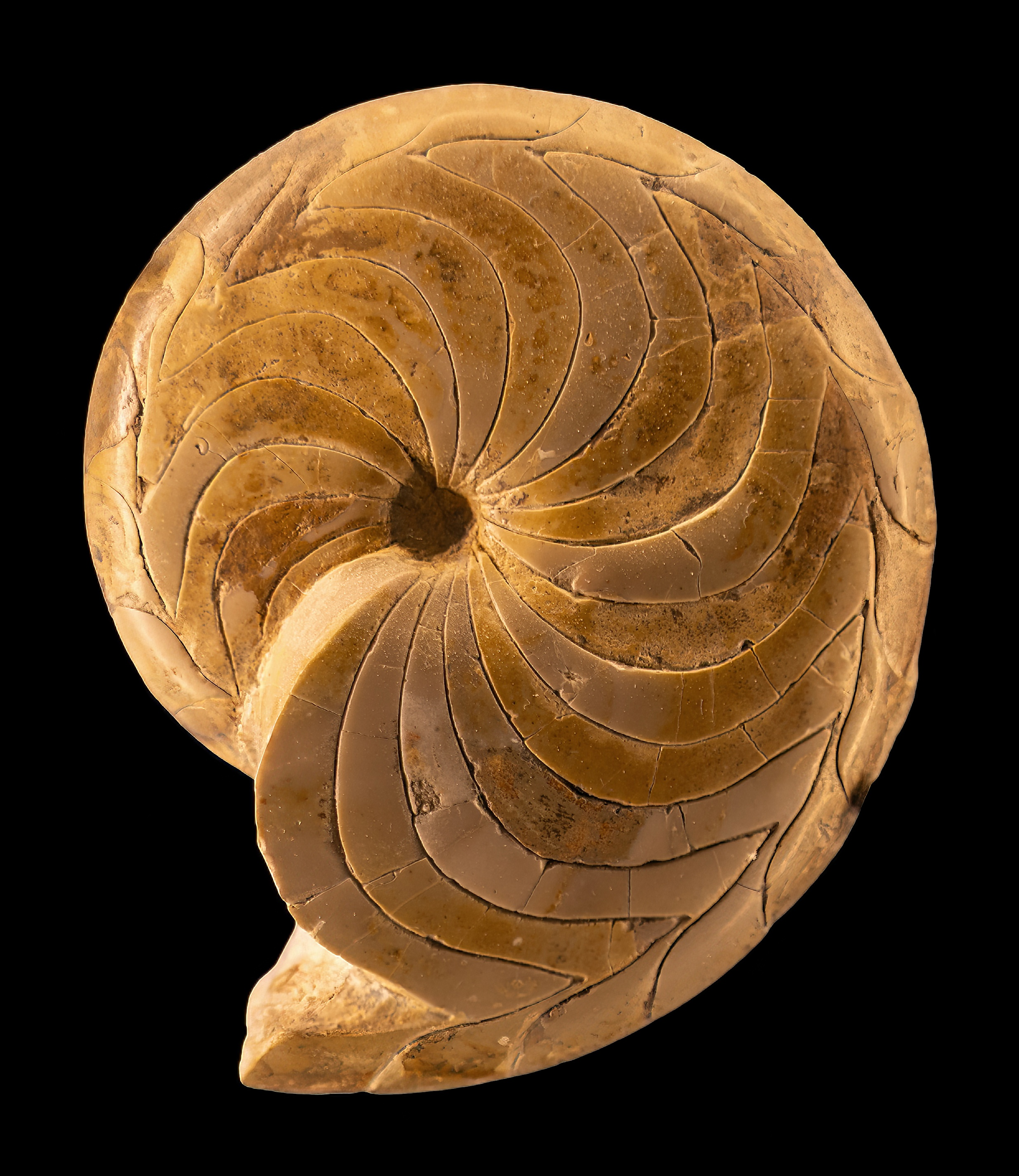
- Imitoceras rotatorium. Early Carboniferous, Rockford Limestone, Rockford, Illinois (US).

Scientific classification
- Kingdom: Animalia
- Phylum: Mollusca
- Class: Cephalopoda
- Subclass: †Ammonoidea
- Order: †Goniatitida
- Family: †Prionoceratidae
- Subfamily: †Imitoceratinae; Ruzhencev, 1950

Genera
- Imitoceras; Irinoceras; Triimitoceras

= Imitoceratinae =

Extinct subfamily of molluscs

Imitoceratinae is one of six subfamilies of the Prionoceratidae family, a member of the Goniatitida order. They are an extinct group of ammonoid, which are shelled cephalopods related to squids, belemnites, octopuses, and cuttlefish, and more distantly to the nautiloids.

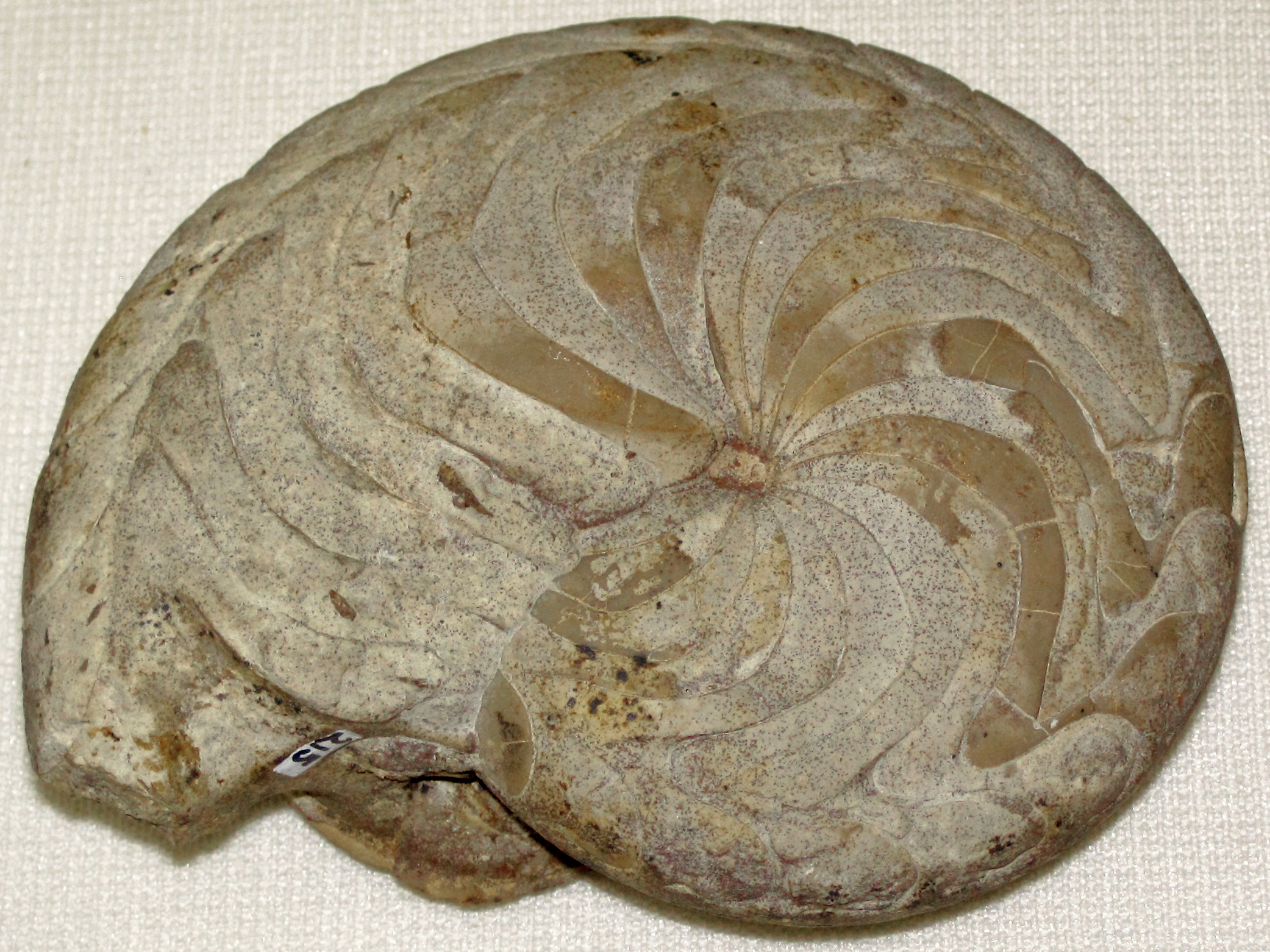
Imitoceras rotatorium (Mississippian). Seymour, Indiana (US)
