= Conus transkeiensis =

Scientific classification
- Kingdom: Animalia
- Phylum: Mollusca
- Class: Gastropoda
- Subclass: Caenogastropoda
- Order: Neogastropoda
- Superfamily: Conoidea
- Family: Conidae
- Genus: Conus
- Species: C. transkeiensis

Binomial name
- Conus transkeiensis Korn, 1998

Synonyms
- Conus pictus transkeiensis Korn, 1998; Pictoconus transkeiensis (Korn, 1998); Sciteconus pictus transkeiensis (Korn, 1998)

Species of gastropod

Conus transkeiensis is a species of sea snail, a marine gastropod mollusk, in the family Conidae, the cone snails and their allies.
