= Muscatatuck Group =

Geologic formation in Indiana, USA

- Stratigraphic range: Devonian
- Type: Group
- Sub-units: Northern Indiana: Traverse Formation; Detroit River Formation; Southern Indiana, Illinois and Kentucky: North Vernon Limestone; Beechwood Limestone; Silver Creek Limestone; Speed Member; Jeffersonville Limestone; Dutch Creek Sandstone Member; Geneva Dolomite Member; Vernon Fork Member; Fraunfelter
- Underlies: New Albany Shale and Antrim Shale in Northern Indiana
- Overlies: New Harmony Group in Southern Indiana Wabash Formation (Salina Group) Elsewhere

Lithology
- Primary: Dolomite, limestone
- Other: Sandstone Anhydrite Gypsum

Location
- Region: Indiana, Illinois, Kentucky
- Country: United States

Type section
- Named for: Its many exposures along the Muscatatuck River
- Named by: Shaver, 1974

The Muscatatuck Group is a Middle Devonian Aged unit found in Illinois, Indiana and Kentucky. It is characterized by being predominantly made up of Dolomite and limestone.

== Stratigraphy ==
The Muscatatuck underlies the New Albany Shale throughout of its extent, except in Northern Indiana where it underlies the Antrim Shale.

The North Vernon Limestone is a geologic formation in Indiana. Also called the Sellersburg Limestone, this term however is no longer in use. Originally called "Corniferous Limestone" it was defined as the unit between the New Albany Shale and the Jeffersonville Lime. The North Vernon has two members.

The Beechwood Limestone Member. Defined by its Crinoidal Beds. Also a member of the Boyle Group.

The Silver Creek Member is massive and mostly grey, often argillaceous.

The Speed member is a shaley limestone.

The Jeffersonville Limestone is a coarse grained, dark gray, thick bedded, fossiliferous limestone.

== Industrial Products ==
Quarries in Pulaski and Shelby Counties produce Agricultural lime, agragrate (crushed stone) and rip rap. Also mined are Portland cement products, industrial lime and Pugmillmaterial.

Several counties produce oil from the Muscatatuck in Indiana.
