= Conus vezoi =

Scientific classification
- Kingdom: Animalia
- Phylum: Mollusca
- Class: Gastropoda
- Subclass: Caenogastropoda
- Order: Neogastropoda
- Superfamily: Conoidea
- Family: Conidae
- Genus: Conus
- Species: C. vezoi

Binomial name
- Conus vezoi Korn, Niederhöfer & Blöcher, 2000

Synonyms
- Conus (Darioconus) vezoi (Korn, Niederhöfer & Blöcher, 2000)· accepted, alternate representation; Conus pennaceus pseudoecho (Bozzetti, 2013); Conus pennaceus vezoi Korn, Niederhöfer & Blöcher, 2000 (original rank); Darioconus pennaceus pseudoecho Bozzetti, 2013; Darioconus pennaceus vezoi (Korn, Niederhöfer & Blöcher, 2000); Darioconus vezoi (Korn, Niederhöfer & Blöcher, 2000)

Species of sea snail

Conus vezoi is a species of sea snail, a marine gastropod mollusk in the family Conidae, the cone snails, cone shells or cones.

These snails are predatory and venomous. They are capable of stinging humans.

== Distribution ==
This marine species of cone snail occurs off Madagascar
