= Masonoceras =

Masonoceras Temporal range: Early Mississippian

Scientific classification
- Kingdom: Animalia
- Phylum: Mollusca
- Class: Cephalopoda
- Subclass: †Ammonoidea
- Order: †Goniatitida
- Family: †Karagandoceratidae
- Genus: †Masonoceras; Work & Manger, 2002

Genus of molluscs (fossil)

Masonoceras is a genus of Karagondoceratids from Lower Mississippian strata, the shell of which is thinly subdiscoidal to discoidal with an acute ventral margin in late ontogeny. Whorls are strongly embracing, the umbilicus narrow to occlude. The mature external suture contains a wide trifid ventral lobe, the flanking prongs longer than the medial, an asymmetrically rounded lateral saddle and a deeper asymmetrically pointed lateral lobe. Internal molds of the type, Mesoceras Kentuckiense show the presence of a broad hyponomic sinus flanked by high rounded vantrolateral salients.

Mesonoceras is similar in general form to this probable ancestor Karagandoceras but differs primarily in its pointed asymmetric lateral lobe, that of Karagandoceras is more symmetric.
