= Conus primus =

Scientific classification
- Kingdom: Animalia
- Phylum: Mollusca
- Class: Gastropoda
- Subclass: Caenogastropoda
- Order: Neogastropoda
- Superfamily: Conoidea
- Family: Conidae
- Genus: Conus
- Species: C. primus

Binomial name
- Conus primus Röckel & Korn, 1990

Synonyms
- Asprella prima (Röckel & Korn, 1990); Conus (Phasmoconus) primus Röckel & Korn, 1990 · accepted, alternate representation; Graphiconus primus (Röckel & Korn, 1990)

Species of sea snail

Conus primus is a species of sea snail, a marine gastropod mollusk in the family Conidae, the cone snails and their allies.

Like all species within the genus Conus, these snails are predatory and venomous. They are capable of stinging humans, therefore live ones should be handled carefully or not at all.

== Description ==
The size of the shell varies between 45 mm and 103 mm.

== Distribution ==
This marine species occurs off the Saya de Malha Bank, Western Indian Ocean
