= Qiannanites =

Qiannanites Temporal range: Early Carboniferous

Scientific classification
- Domain: Eukaryota
- Kingdom: Animalia
- Phylum: Mollusca
- Class: Cephalopoda
- Subclass: †Ammonoidea
- Order: †Goniatitida
- Family: †Prodromitidae
- Genus: †Qiannanites; Ruan, 1981

Genus of molluscs (fossil)

Qiannanites is a genus of goniatitid ammonites from the lower Carboniferous included in the Prodromitidae, which is part of the superfamily Karagandocerataceae, now known as the Karagandoceratoidea.

== Diagnosis ==
The shell of Qiannanites is discoidal with a sharp venter, small umbilicus and rather high aperture. Ribs are faint. Coiling in involute, leaving only the outer whorl exposed. The ventral lobe of the suture is bifurcate with pronounced acute prongs
