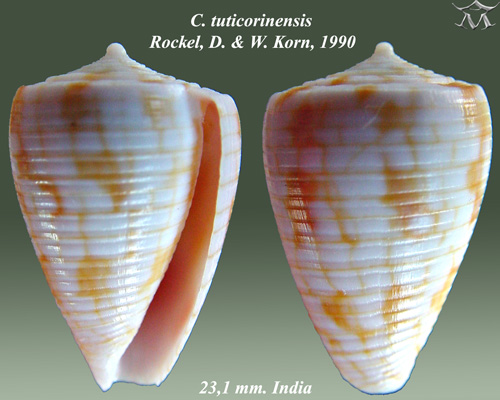
- Apertural and abapertural views of shell of Conus tuticorinensis Rockel, D. & W. Korn, 1990

Conservation status
- Least Concern (IUCN 3.1)

Scientific classification
- Kingdom: Animalia
- Phylum: Mollusca
- Class: Gastropoda
- Subclass: Caenogastropoda
- Order: Neogastropoda
- Superfamily: Conoidea
- Family: Conidae
- Genus: Conus
- Species: C. tuticorinensis

Binomial name
- Conus tuticorinensis Röckel & Korn, 1990

Synonyms
- Conus (Quasiconus) tuticorinensis Röckel & Korn, 1990 · accepted, alternate representation; Quasiconus tuticorinensis (Röckel & Korn, 1990)

= Conus tuticorinensis =

Species of sea snail

Conus tuticorinensis is a species of sea snail, a marine gastropod mollusk in the family Conidae, the cone snails and their allies.

Like all species within the genus Conus, these snails are predatory and venomous. They are capable of stinging humans, therefore live ones should be handled carefully or not at all.

== Description ==
The size of the shell varies between 22 mm and 30 mm.

== Distribution ==
This marine species occurs off India, Sri Lanka, the Philippines and New Guinea.
