= Coffee cone =

Coffee cone may refer to:

- Coffee cone (filter), a conical coffee filter holder
- Conus coffeae, the common name for a sea snail
