= Jeffersonville Limestone =

Bedrock unit in Indiana and Kentucky, United States

- Stratigraphic range: Devonian
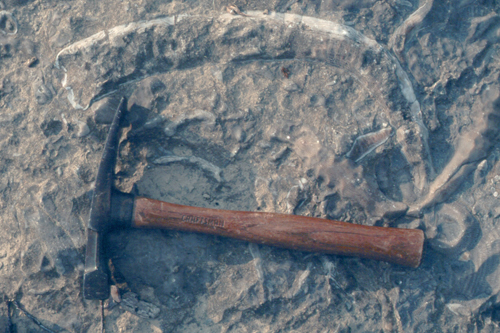
- Large rugose coral (above hammer) in the Jeffersonville Limestone at the Falls of the Ohio
- Type: sedimentary
- Unit of: Muscatatuck Group
- Sub-units: Dutch Creek Sandstone Member, Geneva Dolomite Member, Vernon Fork Member
- Underlies: North Vernon Formation and Sellersburg Limestone
- Overlies: Clear Creek Chert and Louisville Limestone
- Thickness: 20 feet (6.1 m) at Louisville, KY, 0 to 200 feet (0 to 61 m) in southwest Indiana

Lithology
- Primary: limestone

Location
- Region: Cincinnati Arch
- Country: United States
- Extent: Indiana, Kentucky

Type section
- Named for: Jeffersonville, Indiana
- Named by: Edward M. Kindle, 1899

The Devonian Jeffersonville Limestone is a mapped bedrock unit in Indiana and Kentucky. It is highly fossiliferous. The Vernon Fork Member contains Volcanic ash associated with the Tioga Bentonites.

== Description ==
The Jeffersonville is a coarse grained, dark gray, thick bedded, fossiliferous limestone.

R. D. Perkins (1963) divided the Jeffersonville into five zones based on petrology and fossil content, and these are summarized below (in stratigraphic order):

- Paraspirifer acuminatus zone (top)
- fenestrate bryozoan-brachiopod zone
- Brevispirifer gregarius zone
- Amphipora-zone
- Coral zone (base, overlies Geneva Dolomite or Louisville Limestone)

=== Fossils ===
The Jeffersonville Limestone is well known for its fossils, including the well-exposed corals, many in life positions, at Falls of the Ohio.

Edward Kindle described many species from the Falls of the Ohio in 1899:

- Brachiopods: Atrypa aspera, A. reticularis, Chonetes mucronatus, C. yandellanus, Cyrtina hamiltonensis, Derbya keokuk, Discina sp., Leiorhynchus quadricostatum, Orthis iowensis (?), O. livia, Pentamarella arata, Pentamerus nueleus, Productella subamleata var. catarafla, Productus burlingtonensis, Spirifer acuminatus, S. arctisegmentus, S. byrnesi, S. euruteines, S. gregarius, S. keokuk, S. oweni, S. segmentus, S. subattenuatus, Stropheodonta (now Strophodonta) arctostriatus, S. demissa, S. hemispherica, S. perplana, S. varicosus, Syringothyris texta, Terebratula lincklaeni
- Rostroconch: Conocardium trigonale (?), C. cuneus
- Corals: Blothorphyllum decorticatum, Conularia micronema, Cyathophyllum rugosum, Diphyphyllum sp., Favosites hemisphericus, Michelinia cylindrica, Thecia minor, Zaphrentis giganteus, Z. ungula
- Gastropods: Callonema bellatulum, C. imitator, Platyceras dumosum, Platvstoma lineatum, Trochonema rectilatera, Holopea sp., Pleurotomaria sp., Turbo shumardi
- Bivalves: Actinopteria boydi, Aviculopecten sp., Glyptodesma occidentale, Macrodon sp. (?), Modiomorpha affinis, M. mytiloides, Ptychodesma sp.
- Trilobites: Proetus canaliculatus, P. crassimarginatus, P. microgemma, Dalmanites anchiops var. sorbrinus, D. selenurus

Campbell and Wickwire (1955) listed the following species in the Jeffersonville from outcrops in the vicinity of Hanover, Indiana:

- Corals: Heliophyllum halli, Hexagonaria prisma, Favosites turoinatus, F. limitaris, Emmonsia emmonsi, E. epidermatus, Synaptophyllum simcoense, Homalophyllum exiguum, Zaphrentis phyrgia, Blothrophyllum promissum, Alveolites sps., Michelinia sps.
- Bryozoa: Sulcoretepona gilberti, Polypora shumardi
- Gastropods: Platyceras dumosum, Bellerophon patulus
- Brachiopods: Paraspirifer acuminatus, Brevispirifer gregarius, Fimbrispirifer divaricatus, Meristina nasuta, Megastrophia hemispherica
- Bivalves: Turbinopsis shumardi, Glyptodesma occidentali, Conocardium cuneus
- Crinoid: Nucleocrinus verneuili
- Trilobites: Phacops rana, Anchiops anchiops
- Cephalopods: Gyroceras indianense

Other trilobites include the following: Arctinurus sp., Anchiopsis anchiops, Anchiopsis tuberculatus, "Calymene" platys, Coronura aspectans, C. myrmecophorus, C. helena, Crassiproteus clareus, C. crassimarginatus, C. macrocephalus, Greenops kindlei, Odontocephalus bifidus, O. magnus, Odontochile pleuroptyx, Phacops nasutus, Phacops pipa, Trypaulites calypso

Ostracods were documented by Kesling and Peterson in 1958. Genera identified include: Abditoloculina, Adelphobolbina, Ctenoloculina, Flaccivelum, Hollina, Hollinella, and Subligaculum.

The Blastoids Codaster alternatus and Codaster pyramidatus, among others, were identified by Cline and Heuer in 1950 at Falls of the Ohio.

=== Notable exposures ===
Type locality is at Falls of the Ohio State Park near Louisville, Kentucky.

== Age ==
Relative age dating places the Jeffersonville in the lower to middle Devonian. Devera and Fraunfelter identified it as Emsian-Eifelian based on coral and foraminifera.

== See also ==
- List of types of limestone
