= Boyle Group =

Geologic Group in Kentucky, United States

- Stratigraphic range: Devonian
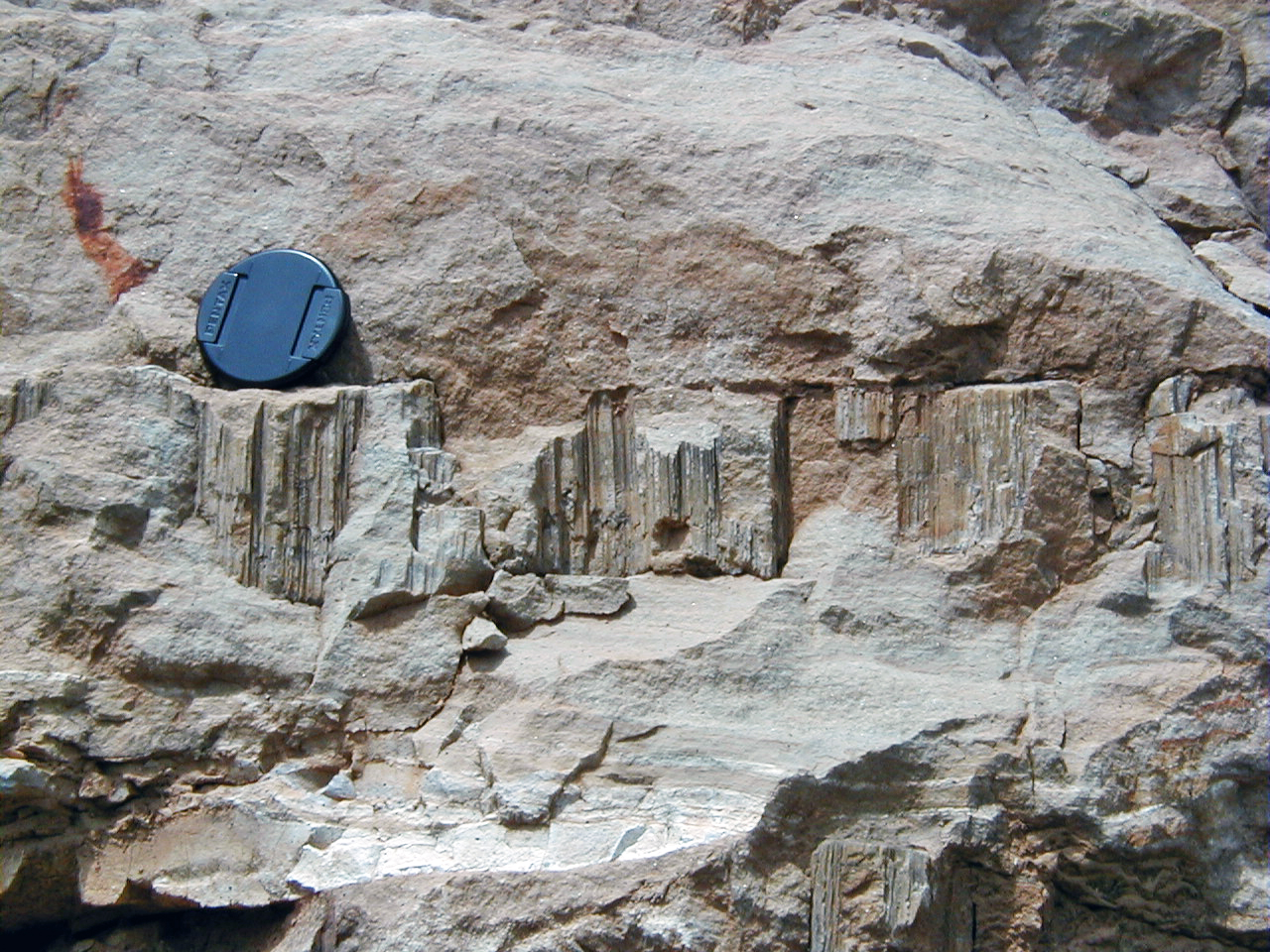
- Stylolite in Boyle Formation, Middle Devonian; Drowning Creek West roadcut, Kentucky
- Type: Group
- Sub-units: Casey Limestone; Beechwood Formation; Kiddville Member
- Underlies: New Albany Shale
- Overlies: Crab Orchard Formation /Alger Shale
- Thickness: 0-47'

Lithology
- Primary: Limestone & Dolomite
- Other: Packstone

Location
- Region: Kentucky
- Country: United States

Type section
- Named for: Boyle County, KY

The Boyle Group, also known as the Boyle Limestone or Boyle Dolomite, is a geologic group found in Kentucky. It dates back to the Devonian period. The Boyle is bound by two unconformities. The one at the top is the Taghanic unconformity and the one at the bottom is the Wallbridge Unconformity. The New Albany Shale uncomfortably lies on top of the Boyle. At its based the Boyle rests uncomfortably on the Crab Orchard Formation.

== Description ==
The upper portion is generally characterized by medium gray to orange-buff dolomite with dolomitic limestone, it is layered with irregular, ellipsoidal, pale cream-colored chert nodules. The lower section is composed of echinoderm grainstone to silty Packstone.

== Stratigraphy ==
The Kiddville is the lowest unit in the Boyle. It is subdivided in smaller distinct sequences. The basial layer of the Boyle is termed the "Kiddville bone bed" (Linney, 1882). The rest on an unconformity with Ordovician to Silurian aged strata. The Kiddville bone bed contains, placoderm bones, which are common throughout this layer, sharks teeth. This bed is a sandy dolostone, with isolated glauconitic sections that may contain black phosphate nodules. Above this is a zone of mudstones, and sandy black shale. Biota include rugose coral, trilobites, brachiopods and chonetids.

Above this is a sequence of sandy grainstone followed by a bluish grey shale, followed by pinkish grey grainstone. This is made up of crinoids, bone fragments and phosphatic nodules. Above is wither a rugose coral reef structure or a shale bed, with abundant pyritized burrows.

The Beechwood unit lies about the Kiddville. This sequence is composed of pinkish grey and orange buff sandy dolostone, with some phosphatic quartz sandstone. Biota include, brachiopods, rugose corals as well as bryozoan. The upper sections of the Beechwood tend to be cherty.

== Fossils ==
There are numerous fossils found within the Boyle Group.
