= Old Clarksville site =

- Old Clarksville Site
- U.S. National Register of Historic Places
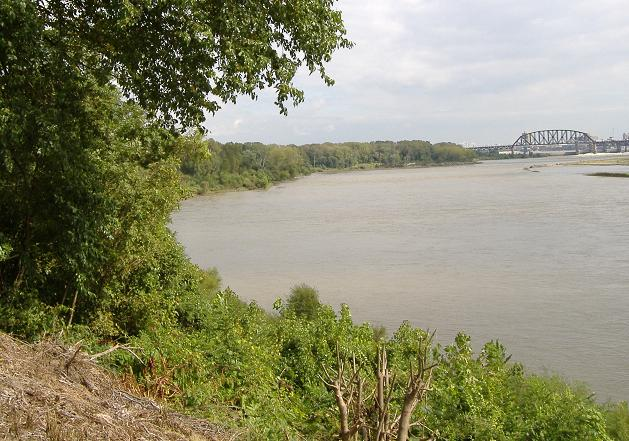
- Riverfront
- Nearest city: Clarksville, Indiana
- Coordinates: 38.287054°N 85.776069°W
- Built: 1784; 242 years ago
- NRHP reference No.: 74000028
- Added to NRHP: December 16, 1974

The Old Clarksville Site is along the waterfront of Clarksville, Indiana, roughly between the Interpretive Center and Clark Homesite of Falls of the Ohio State Park. Officially its address is restricted by the National Register, as much of it is on private property where there is no public access to the Ohio River.

== George Rogers Clark cabin ==
George Rogers Clark built a cabin in 1803, in order to live independently from his sister in Locust Grove. He had built a mill on the property at Mill Run. Visitors to the cabin included Aaron Burr, John James Audubon, and various Indian chiefs. After his accident in 1809 he was forced to leave his cabin for good. The original cabin was lost in 1854. In anticipation of the Bicentennial events for the Lewis & Clark Expedition, in 2001 a reconstruction of Clark's cabin was built, as this was where Meriwether Lewis and Clark's brother William met to start their epic journey.

The homesite was originally under the control of the Culbertson Mansion State Historic Site, but since its establishment, the Falls of the Ohio State Park oversees it.

On May 20, 2021, the reconstruction of the Clark cabin was destroyed by fire.

== Gallery ==
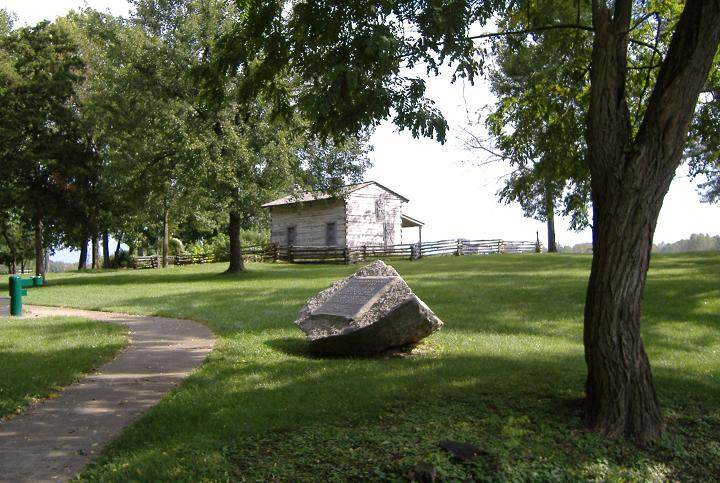
Cabin from afar

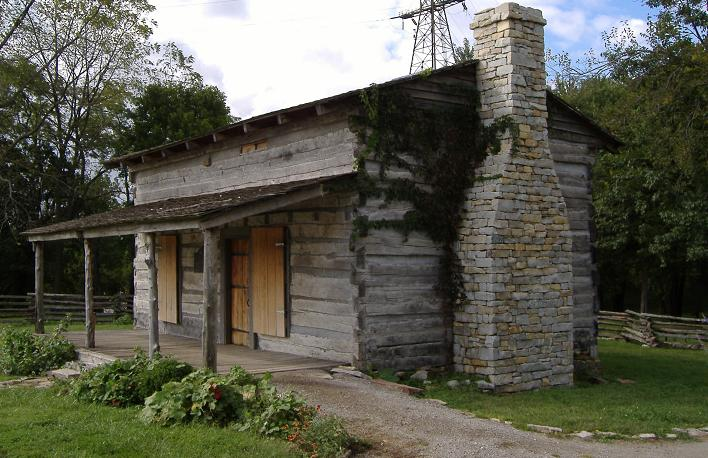
Cabin from close

== See also ==
- List of archaeological sites on the National Register of Historic Places in Indiana
