= Prodromitidae =

Scientific classification
- Kingdom: Animalia
- Phylum: Mollusca
- Class: Cephalopoda
- Subclass: †Ammonoidea
- Order: †Goniatitida
- Superfamily: †Karagandoceratoidea
- Family: †Prodromitidae; Arthaber, 1911

Genera
- Asidoceras; Eoprodromites; Paraqiannanites; Prodromites; Qiannanites

Prodromitidae is one of two families of the superfamily Karagandoceratoidea, a member of the Goniatitida order. They are an extinct group of ammonoid, which are shelled cephalopods related to squids, belemnites, octopuses, and cuttlefish, and more distantly to the nautiloids.
