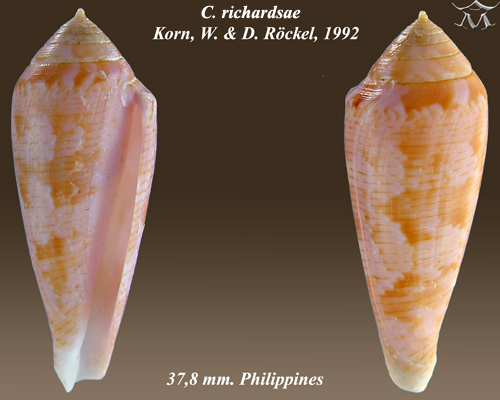
- Apertural and abapertural views of shell of Conus richardsae Korn, W. & D. Röckel, 1992
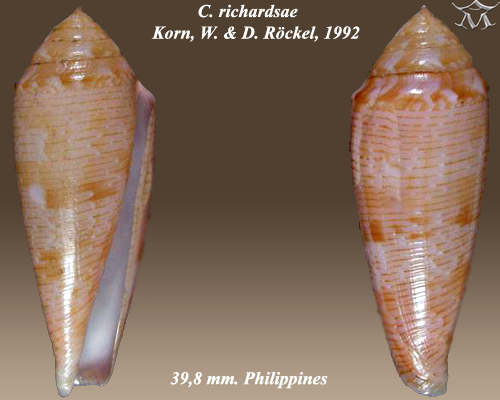

Conservation status
- Data Deficient (IUCN 3.1)

Scientific classification
- Kingdom: Animalia
- Phylum: Mollusca
- Class: Gastropoda
- Subclass: Caenogastropoda
- Order: Neogastropoda
- Superfamily: Conoidea
- Family: Conidae
- Genus: Conus
- Species: C. richardsae

Binomial name
- Conus richardsae Röckel & Korn, 1992

Synonyms
- Conus (Splinoconus) richardsae Röckel & Korn, 1992 · accepted, alternate representation; Conus luteus richardsae Röckel & Korn, 1992; Hermes richardsae Röckel & Korn, 1992; Isoconus richardsae (Röckel & Korn, 1992); Leporiconus luteus richardsae (Röckel & Korn, 1992)

= Conus richardsae =

Species of sea snail

Conus richardsae is a species of sea snail, a marine gastropod mollusk in the family Conidae, the cone snails and their allies.

Like all species within the genus Conus, these snails are predatory and venomous. They are capable of stinging humans, therefore live ones should be handled carefully or not at all.

== Description ==
The size of the shell varies between 32 mm and 48 mm.

== Distribution ==
This marine species occurs off the Philippines and New Caledonia.
