= Falls of the Ohio State Park =

State park in Indiana, United States

- IUCN category III (natural monument or feature)
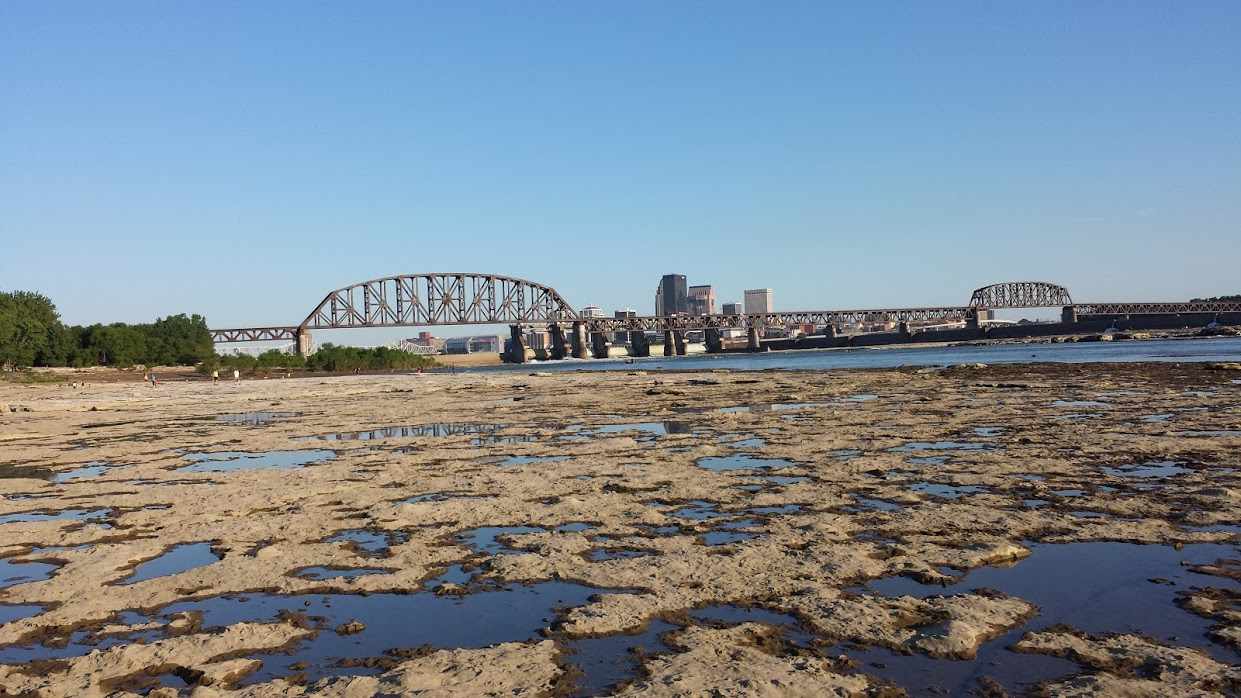
- The park fossil beds in 2016

- Location within Indiana
- Location: Clark County, Indiana, US
- Nearest city: Clarksville, Indiana
- Coordinates: 38°16′32″N 85°45′49″W
- Area: 165 acres (67 ha)
- Established: 1990
- Visitors: 158,680 (in 2018–2019<)
- Governing body: Indiana Department of Natural Resources

Falls of the Ohio State Park is a state park in the U.S. state of Indiana. It is located on the banks of the Ohio River at Clarksville, Indiana, across from Louisville, Kentucky. The park is part of the Falls of the Ohio National Wildlife Conservation Area. The exposed fossil beds of the Jeffersonville Limestone dated from the Devonian period are the main feature of the park, attracting about 160,000 visitors annually.

== Description ==
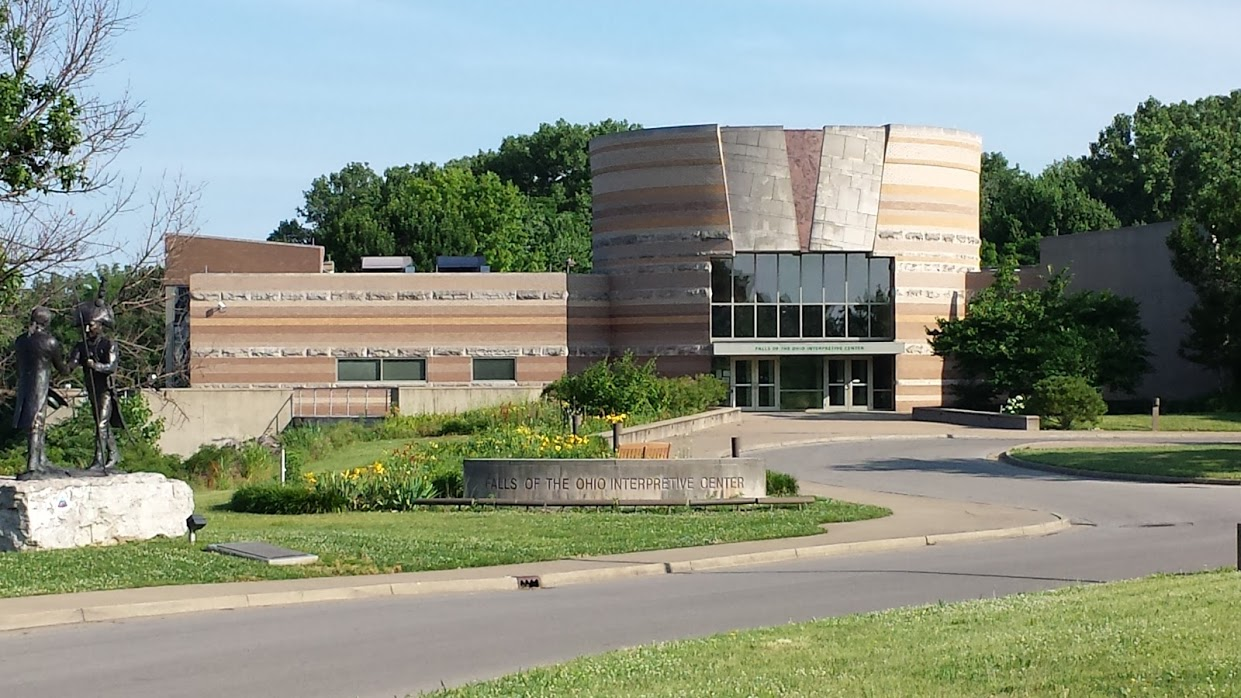
The Interpretive Center in 2016

The park includes an interpretive center open to the public. The center functions as a museum with exhibits that concentrate on the natural history related to findings in the nearby fossil beds as well as the human history of the Louisville area, covering pre-settlement, early settlement, and the history of Louisville and southern Indiana through the 20th century.

The Woodland Loop Trail features ten stainless steel markers denoting the plant life of the trails, thanks to an Eagle Scout project.

Unlike at other Indiana state parks, annual entrance permits do not allow unlimited free access (rather, only five people per pass per visit) to the interpretive center, as fees are still needed to reimburse the town of Clarksville for building the center.

== History ==
The Falls was the site where Lewis and Clark met for the Lewis and Clark Expedition at George Rogers Clark's cabin.

In 1990, the Indiana state government hired Terry Chase, a well-established exhibit developer, to design the interpretive center's displays. Construction began in September 1992, costing $4.9 million with a total area of 16,000 sq ft (1,500 m^{2}).

== Gallery ==
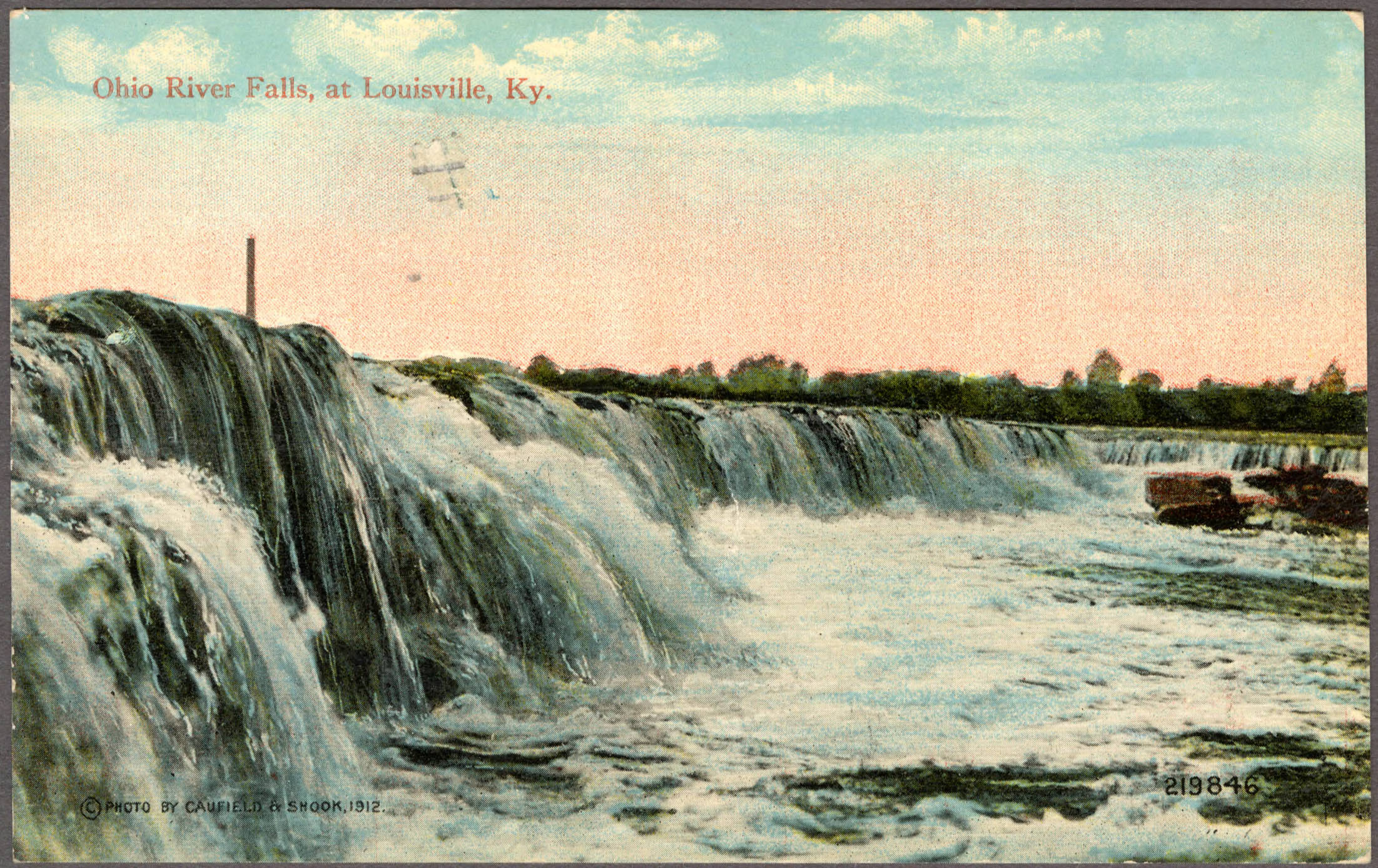
The Ohio River Falls in 1912

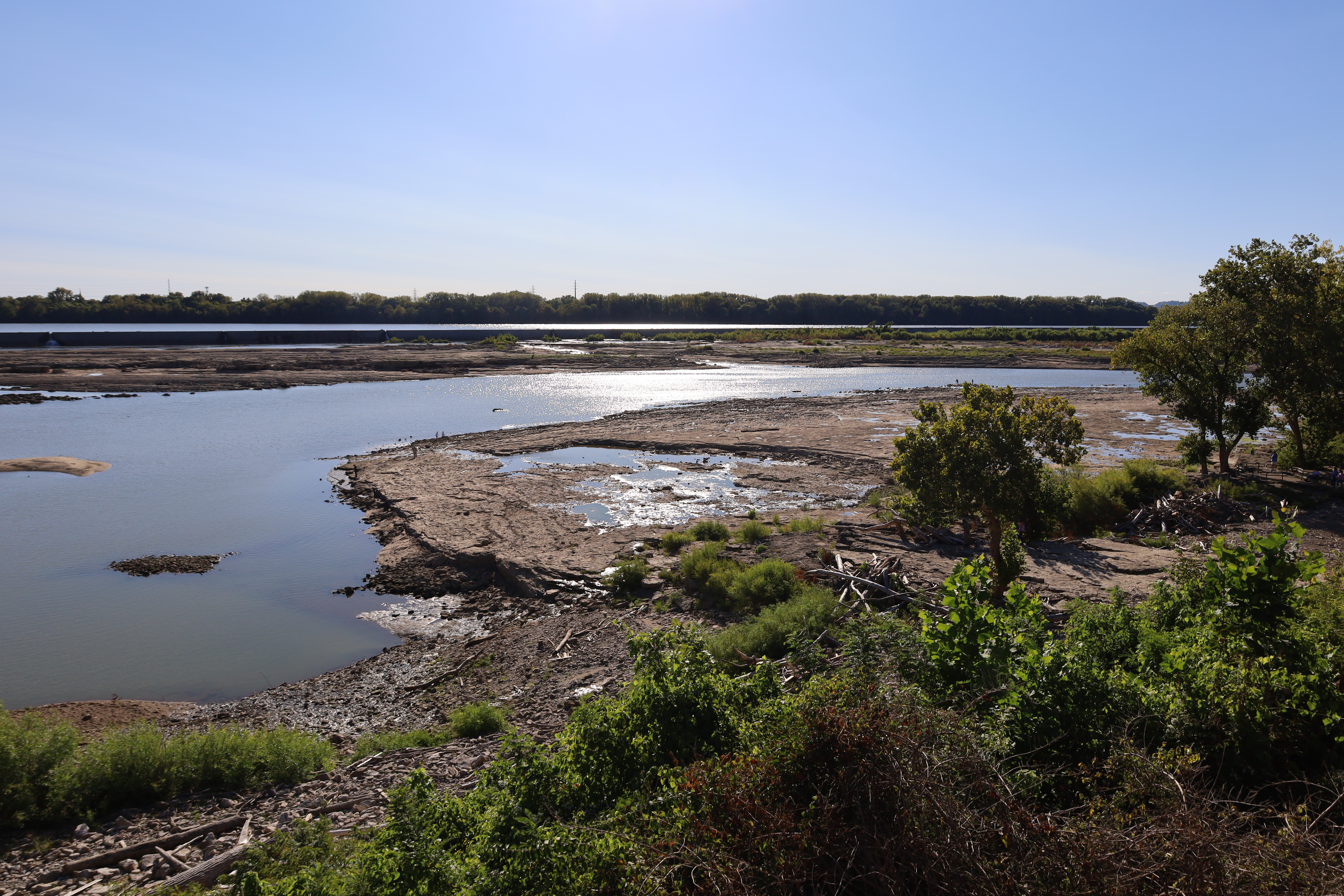
View of the fossil bed from the overlook in 2025

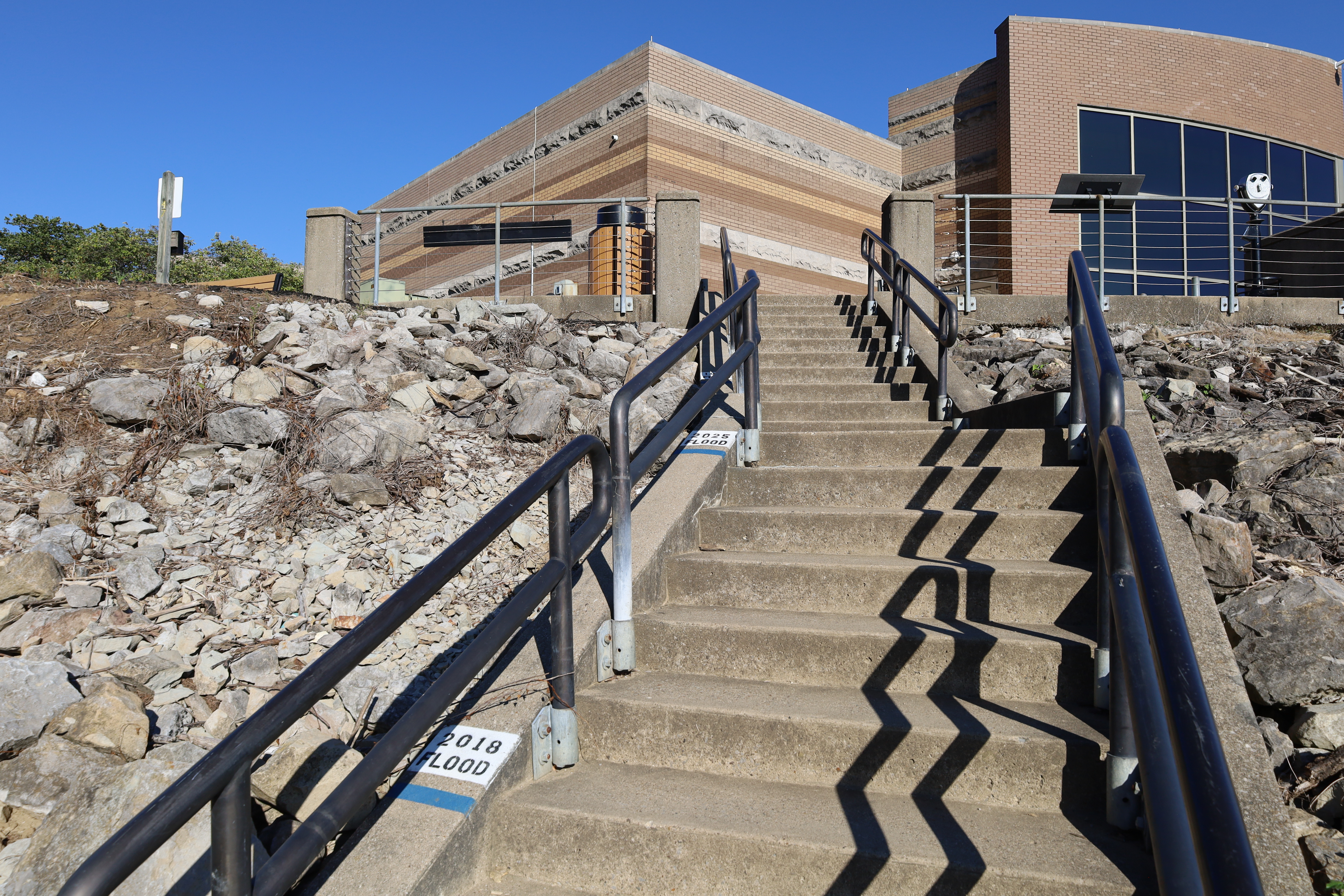
Flood markers on a staircase for the floods of 1937, 2018, and 2025

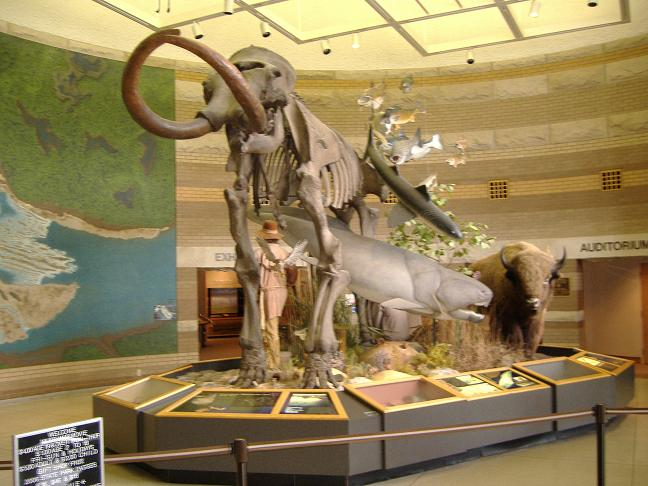
Interpretive Center Lobby in 2006

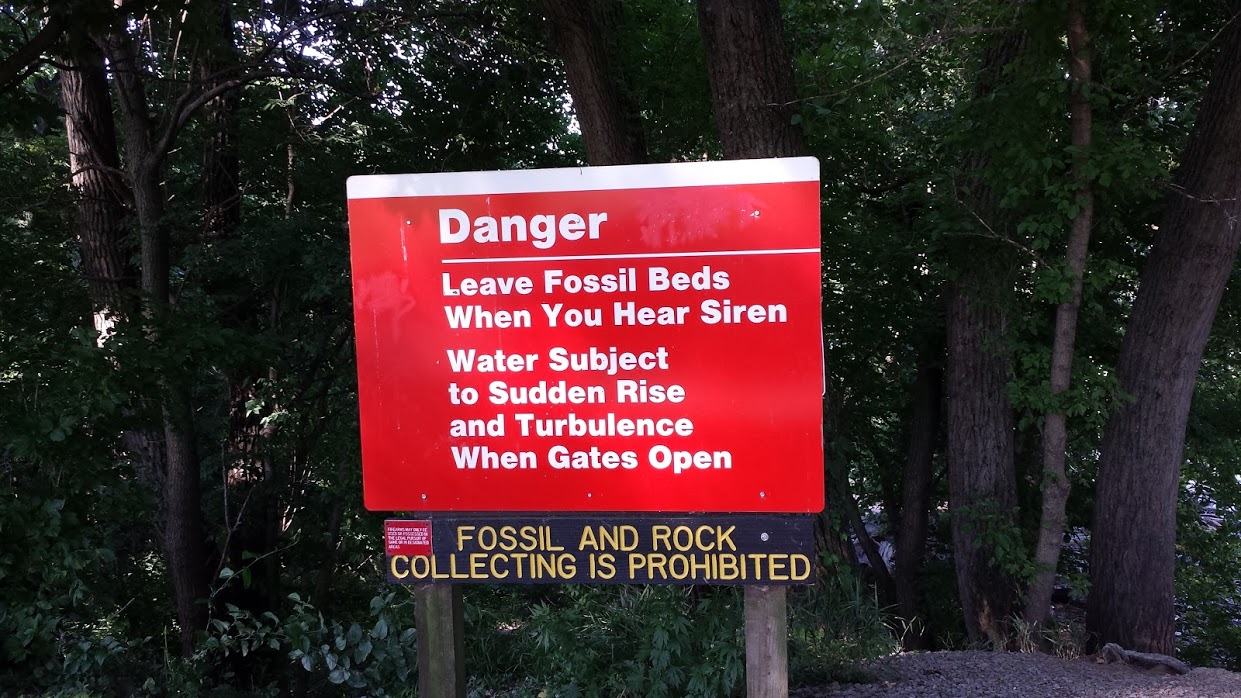
Warning sign in 2016

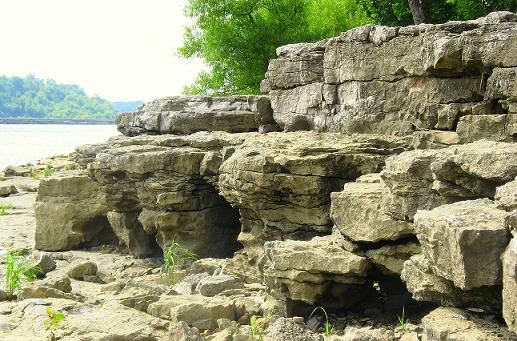
Fossil formations (Devonian Jeffersonville Limestone) found along the shores of the Ohio River.

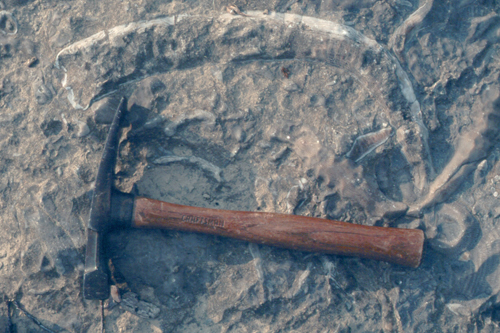
Large rugose coral (above hammer) at the Falls of the Ohio

== See also ==
- The Filson Historical Society
- List of attractions and events in the Louisville metropolitan area
- List of fossil sites
- Old Clarksville Site
- Falls of the Ohio National Wildlife Conservation Area: More information about the geology of the Falls
