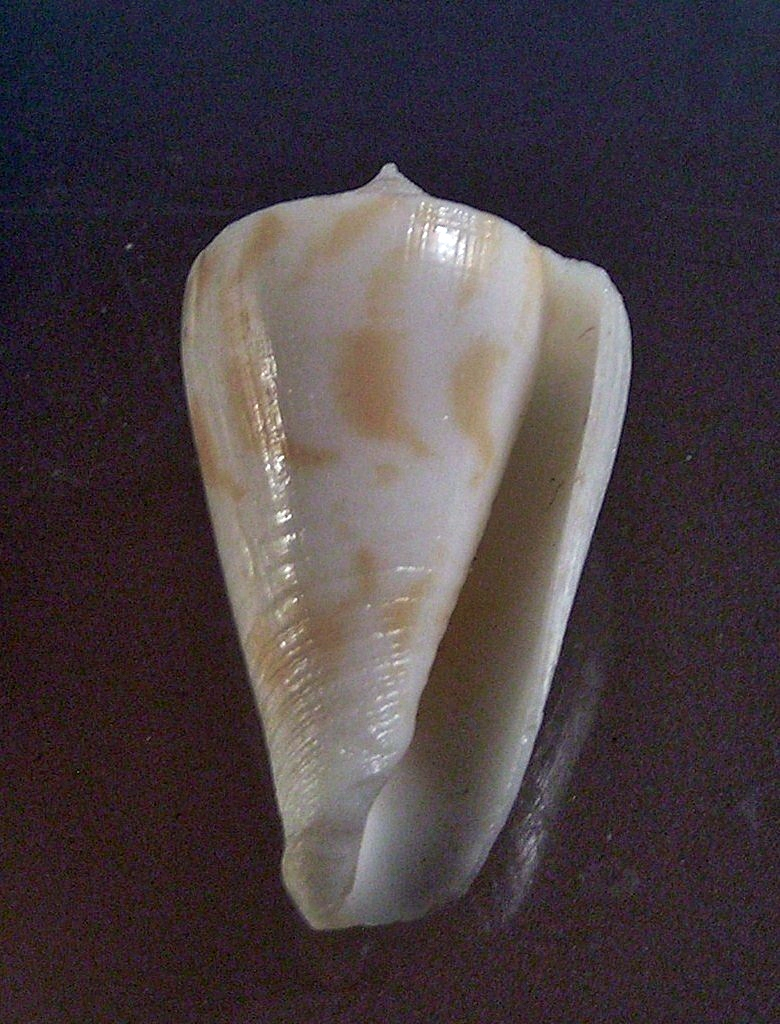
- Apertural view of Conus colmani

Conservation status
- Data Deficient (IUCN 3.1)

Scientific classification
- Kingdom: Animalia
- Phylum: Mollusca
- Class: Gastropoda
- Subclass: Caenogastropoda
- Order: Neogastropoda
- Superfamily: Conoidea
- Family: Conidae
- Genus: Conus
- Species: C. colmani

Binomial name
- Conus colmani Röckel & Korn, 1990

Synonyms
- Asprella colmani (Röckel & Korn, 1990); Conus (Eremiconus) colmani Röckel & Korn, 1990 · accepted, alternate representation; Eremiconus colmani (Röckel & Korn, 1990)

= Conus colmani =

Species of sea snail

Conus colmani is a species of sea snail, a marine gastropod mollusk in the family Conidae, the cone snails and their allies.

Like all species within the genus Conus, these snails are predatory and venomous. They are capable of stinging humans, therefore live ones should be handled carefully or not at all.

== Taxonomy ==
Conus colmani is part of a species complex including Conus albellus, Conus lizardensis and Conus limpusi, that needs re-evaluation. For conservation implications, all are here tentatively listed as distinct species.

Recent phylogenetic studies on the genus Conus have identified several deep evolutionary lineages, suggesting that traditional morphology-based taxonomy may underestimate true species diversity. Molecular analyses show that many Conus species complexes contain cryptic or closely related taxa that are difficult to distinguish by shell characteristics alone. These findings support treating the C. colmani–C. albellus–C. lizardensis–C. limpusi complex as a group requiring further genetic investigation.

== Description ==
The size of an adult shell varies between 35 mm and 52 mm. The shell of Conus colmani shows notable variation in coloration and surface patterning, consistent with trends in closely related species. Shells are typically slender with a moderately elevated spire and fine spiral striations along the body whorl. Although detailed color morphs remain poorly documented, members of the species complex frequently exhibit pale backgrounds with brown or tan banding, suggesting that C. colmani may display similar features.

== Distribution ==
This marine species is endemic to Australia and is found off Queensland.

== Ecology ==
Like other members of the genus, Conus colmani is predatory and venomous, using a specialized radular tooth to inject conotoxins into its prey. The genus exhibits a wide range of feeding strategies, with different species specializing in worms, mollusks, or small fish. Although the specific diet of C. colmani has not been studied directly, its close relatives within the species complex suggest that it is likely vermivorous. Prey specialization has been identified as a major driver of diversification and venom evolution in the genus.

Species of Conus produce highly complex venoms consisting of dozens to hundreds of small peptide toxins known as conotoxins. These peptides evolve rapidly in response to ecological pressures such as prey type and competition. Although no species-specific venom profile is available for Conus colmani, genomic studies across the genus show that closely related species tend to share major toxin gene families, with species-level variations shaped by natural selection. This suggests that C. colmani likely possesses a diverse conotoxin repertoire similar to other Indo-Pacific cone snails.

== Conservation ==
Conus colmani is listed as Data Deficient (DD) by the IUCN, reflecting the limited information available on its population size, habitat requirements, and potential threats. Its restricted coastal distribution off Queensland may make it vulnerable to habitat alteration, coastal development, and localized collection. Many cone snail species with small ranges face similar uncertainties, and researchers note the need for targeted field studies to assess population stability and conservation needs.
