= Louisville Limestone =

Geologic formation in Indiana, Kentucky, and Ohio, United States

- Stratigraphic range: Homerian - Ludfordian
- Type: Formation
- Underlies: Jeffersonville Limestone and Wabash Formation
- Overlies: Waldron Shale

Location
- Region: Indiana, Kentucky, and Ohio
- Country: United States

The Louisville Limestone is a geologic formation in Ohio. It preserves fossils dating back to the Silurian period.

== See also ==
- List of fossiliferous stratigraphic units in Ohio
