= Conus albellus =

Scientific classification
- Kingdom: Animalia
- Phylum: Mollusca
- Class: Gastropoda
- Subclass: Caenogastropoda
- Order: Neogastropoda
- Superfamily: Conoidea
- Family: Conidae
- Genus: Conus
- Species: C. albellus

Binomial name
- Conus albellus Röckel & Korn, 1990

Synonyms
- Conus (Eremiconus) albellus Röckel & Korn, 1990 · accepted, alternate representation

Species of sea snail

Conus albellus, common name snowy cone snail, is a species of sea snail, a marine gastropod mollusk in the family Conidae, the cone snails, cone shells or cones.

== Notes ==
Additional information regarding this species:

- Taxonomy: Conus albellus is part of a species complex including C. limpusi, C. lizardensis and C. colmani, that needs re-evaluation. For conservation implications, all are here tentatively listed as distinct.

== Distribution ==
This marine species is endemic to Australia and occurs off Queensland.
