= New Albany Shale =

Geologic formation in the United States

- Stratigraphic range: Devonian-Mississippian
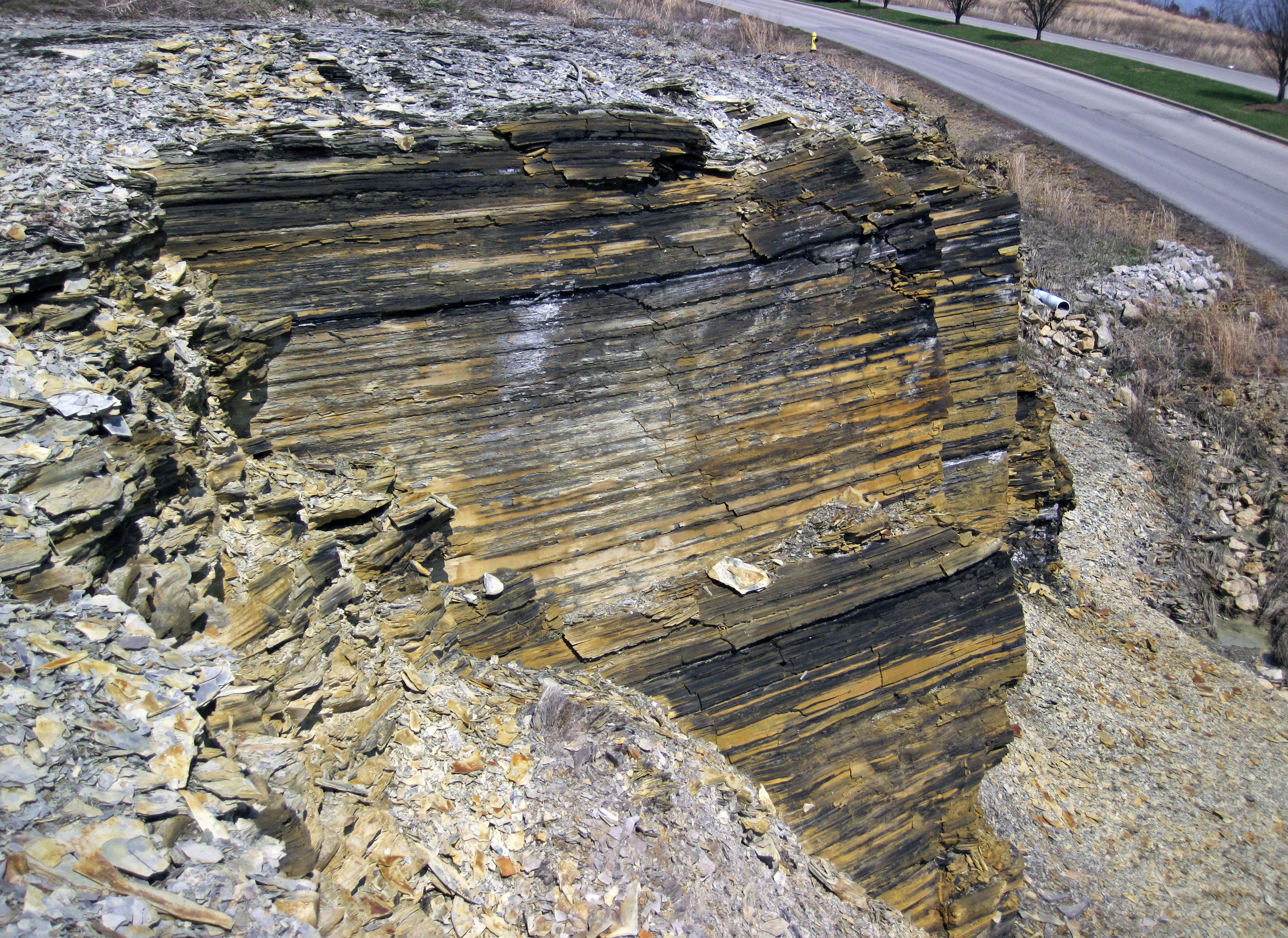
- New Albany Shale, outcrops in Bullitt County, Kentucky
- Type: Formation
- Sub-units: Blocher, Camp Run, Clegg Creek, Lower Blackiston, Morgan Trail & Selmier members
- Underlies: Hannibal Shale & Rockford Limestone
- Overlies: Boyle Formation, North Vernon, Sellersburg & Sylamore Limestones

Lithology
- Primary: Shale
- Other: Dolomite, limestone, phosphorite

Location
- Coordinates: 38.7°N 85.7°W
- Approximate paleocoordinates: 27.0°S 33.9°W
- Region: Illinois, Indiana, and Kentucky
- Country: United States
- Extent: Illinois Basin

Type section
- Named for: New Albany, Indiana
- New Albany Shale (the United States) New Albany Shale (Indiana)

The New Albany Shale is an organic-rich geologic formation of Devonian and Mississippian age in the Illinois Basin of the United States. It is a major source of hydrocarbons.

== Stratigraphy ==
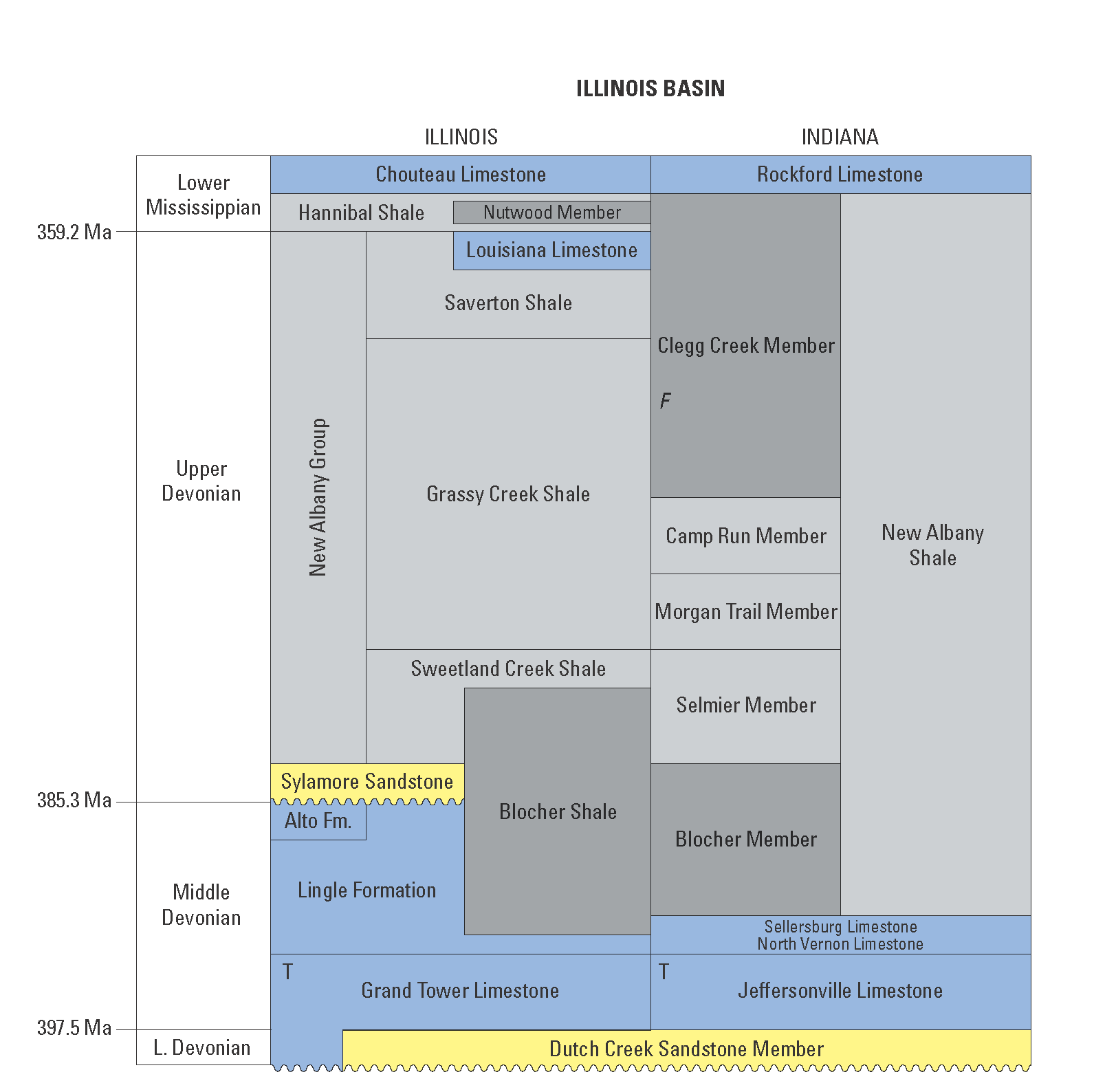
New Albany Stratigraphy

The New Albany formation consists of brown, black, and green shale with minor beds of dolomite and sandstone. It was deposited under anoxic marine conditions. Pyrite is a common accessory mineral, and parts of the shale have greater than 4% by weight of organic carbon. The black shale layers have anomalously high radioactivity (due to uranium), phosphorus, and heavy metals. The formation was named for outcrops near New Albany, Indiana. It is one of a number of organic-rich shales of upper Devonian and lower Mississippian age in North America. It is correlative with the Antrim Shale of the Michigan Basin, the Ohio Shale of Ohio and eastern Kentucky, and the Chattanooga Shale of Tennessee and central Kentucky.

The formation is composed of six members. These members in ascending stratigraphic order are the Blocher, the Selmier, the Morgan Trail, the Camp Run, the Clegg Creek and the Ellsworth. The Blocher consists of brownish-black to grayish-black, slightly calcareous pyritic shale. The Selmier is a greenish-gray to olive-gray shale. The Morgan Trail is a brownish-black to olive-black fissile siliceous pyritic shale. The Camp Run is a greenish-gray to olive-gray shale interbedded with brownish-black shale. The Clegg Creek is a brownish black pyritic shale that is rich in organic matter. The Ellsworth is composed of a lower part of interbedded brownish-black shale and an upper part of greenish-gray shale.

== Natural resources ==
Natural gas is produced from wells completed in the New Albany Shale in the southern part of the basin in Indiana and western Kentucky. As of 2001, technically recoverable shale gas in the New Albany was estimated to be between 1.9 and 19.2 trillion cubic feet. More recently reserves have been estimated as high as 160 trillion cubic feet.

The New Albany Shale is also a major deposit of oil shale. The Eastern Devonian shale has been estimated to contain 189,000 10^{6} bbls of oil.

The formation is also thought to be the source rock of petroleum found in Devonian and Silurian formations in the basin. It is hypothesized that the long-distance migration of oil from the New Albany Shale into surrounding sandstones was caused by orogenies occurring to the east. These orogenies caused periods of uplift and subsidence that influenced movement of the hydrocarbons in the Illinois Basin.

== See also ==
- Shale gas in the United States
