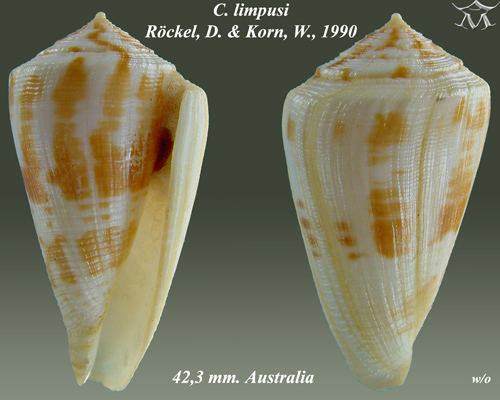
- Apertural and abapertural views of shell of Conus limpusi Röckel, D. & Korn, W., 1990

Scientific classification
- Kingdom: Animalia
- Phylum: Mollusca
- Class: Gastropoda
- Subclass: Caenogastropoda
- Order: Neogastropoda
- Superfamily: Conoidea
- Family: Conidae
- Genus: Conus
- Species: C. limpusi

Binomial name
- Conus limpusi Röckel & Korn, 1990

Synonyms
- Asprella limpusi (Röckel & Korn, 1990); Conus (Eremiconus) limpusi Röckel & Korn, 1990 · accepted, alternate representation; Eremiconus limpusi (Röckel & Korn, 1990) ·

= Conus limpusi =

Species of sea snail

Conus limpusi is a species of sea snail, a marine gastropod mollusk in the family Conidae, the cone snails and their allies.

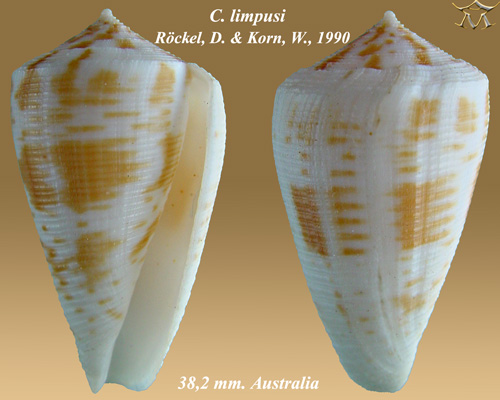
Conus limpusi Röckel, D. & Korn, W., 1990

Like all species within the genus Conus, these snails are predatory and venomous. They are capable of stinging humans, therefore live ones should be handled carefully or not at all.

== Taxonomy ==
Conus limpusi is part of a species complex including Conus albellus, Conus lizardensis and Conus colmani, that needs re-evaluation. For conservation implications, all are here tentatively listed as distinct species.

== Description ==
The size of the shell varies between 30 mm and 55 mm. Larval shells have 1.75–2 whorls and a maximum diameter of 1.2–1.3 mm.

== Distribution ==
This is an Australia Queensland marine species.
