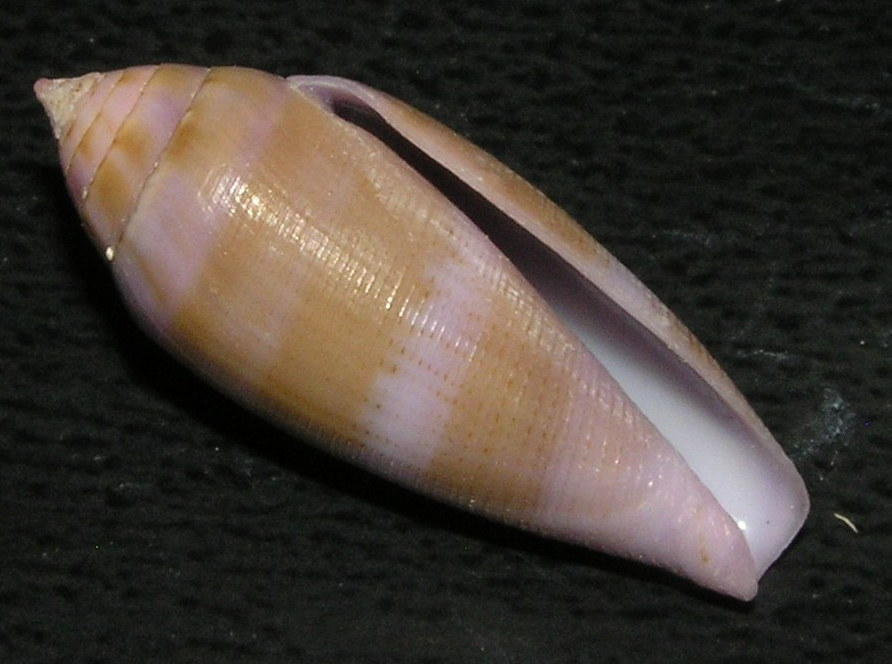
- Apertural view of a shell of Conus luteus

Conservation status
- Data Deficient (IUCN 3.1)

Scientific classification
- Kingdom: Animalia
- Phylum: Mollusca
- Class: Gastropoda
- Subclass: Caenogastropoda
- Order: Neogastropoda
- Superfamily: Conoidea
- Family: Conidae
- Genus: Conus
- Species: C. luteus

Binomial name
- Conus luteus Sowerby I, 1833

Synonyms
- Conus (Leporiconus) luteus G. B. Sowerby I, 1833 · accepted, alternate representation; Conus daucus var. luteus Krebs, 1864 (invalid: junior homonym of Conus luteus G.B. Sowerby I, 1833); Isoconus luteus (G. B. Sowerby I, 1833); Leporiconus luteus (G.B. Sowerby I, 1833)

= Conus luteus =

Species of sea snail

Conus luteus, the mud cone, is a species of predatory sea snail, a marine gastropod mollusk in the family Conidae, the cone snails, cone shells or cones.

The subspecies Conus luteus richardsae Röckel & Korn, 1992 has been raised to species level as Conus richardsae Röckel & Korn, 1992

== Description ==
The size of an adult shell varies between 18 mm and 54 mm. The color of the shell is yellow, pink or purplish, encircled by chestnut lines which are mostly broken up into chestnut and white articulations, an irregular white band below the middle. The aperture is purplish, with a central white band.

== Distribution ==
This species occurs in the demersal zone of the Pacific Ocean from the Philippines to Northern Australia; off the Tuamotus.
