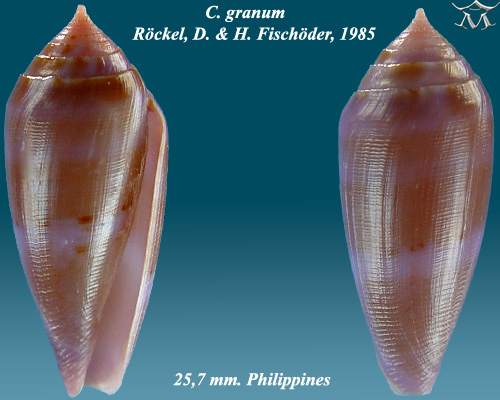
- Apertural and abapertural views of shell of Conus granum Röckel, D. & H. Fischöder, 1985

Scientific classification
- Kingdom: Animalia
- Phylum: Mollusca
- Class: Gastropoda
- Subclass: Caenogastropoda
- Order: Neogastropoda
- Superfamily: Conoidea
- Family: Conidae
- Genus: Conus
- Species: C. granum

Binomial name
- Conus granum Röckel & Fischöder, 1985

Synonyms
- Conus (Leporiconus) granum Röckel & Fischöder, 1985 · accepted, alternate representation; Leporiconus granum (Röckel & Fischöder, 1985)

= Conus granum =

Species of sea snail

Conus granum is a species of sea snail, a marine gastropod mollusk in the family Conidae, the cone snails and their allies.

Like all species within the genus Conus, these snails are predatory and venomous. They are capable of stinging humans, therefore live ones should be handled carefully or not at all.

== Description ==
The size of the shell varies between 18 mm and 40 mm, is typically orange or reddish-brown, and has an almost teardrop shape.

== Distribution ==
This marine species occurs off the Maldives, Taiwan; Fiji, New Caledonia, and Australia (Northern Territory, Queensland).
