= Karagandoceratidae =

Karagandoceratidae Temporal range: Mississippian

Scientific classification
- Kingdom: Animalia
- Phylum: Mollusca
- Class: Cephalopoda
- Subclass: †Ammonoidea
- Order: †Goniatitida
- Superfamily: †Karagandoceratoidea
- Family: †Karagandoceratidae; Librovich, 1957

Synonyms
- Karagandoceratinae Ruzhencev, 1950

Extinct family of molluscs

The Karagondoceratidae is a small family of tornoceratin Goniatitida from the Lower Carboniferous (early Mississippian) which typifies the Karagandoceratoidea, in which it is included.

Karagandoceratids are characterized by discoidal to lenticular shells that are oxyconic or keeled in the adult and in which the ventral lobe of the suture is ontogenetically subdivided, either trifurcated or bifurcated.

The known genera are Bartzschiceras, Karagandoceras, and Masonoceras, and possibly Voehringerites
