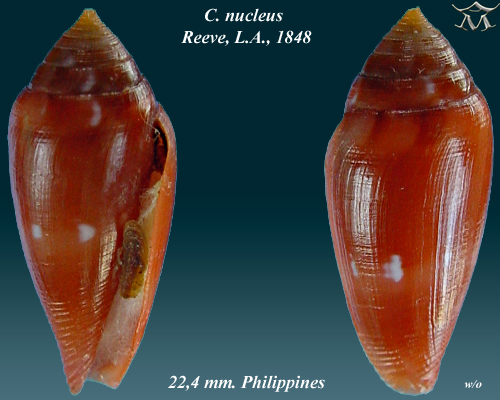
- Apertural and abapertural views of shell of Conus nucleus Reeve, L.A., 1848
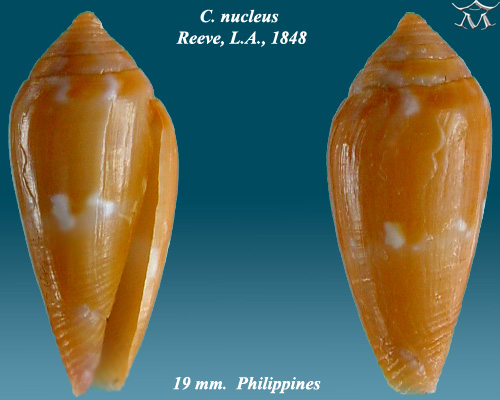

Conservation status
- Least Concern (IUCN 3.1)

Scientific classification
- Kingdom: Animalia
- Phylum: Mollusca
- Class: Gastropoda
- Subclass: Caenogastropoda
- Order: Neogastropoda
- Superfamily: Conoidea
- Family: Conidae
- Genus: Conus
- Species: C. nucleus

Binomial name
- Conus nucleus Reeve, 1848

Synonyms
- Conus (Splinoconus) nucleus Reeve, 1848 · accepted, alternate representation; Isoconus nucleus (Reeve, 1848); Leporiconus nucleus (Reeve, 1848)

= Conus nucleus =

Species of sea snail

Conus nucleus is a species of sea snail, a marine gastropod mollusk in the family Conidae, the cone snails and their allies.

Like all species within the genus Conus, these snails are predatory and venomous. They are capable of stinging humans, therefore live ones should be handled carefully or not at all.

== Description ==
The size of the shell varies between 16 mm and 25 mm. The shell shows fine revolving striae. Its color is orange-brown, with an irregular white band, and spots. The aperture is violaceous.

== Distribution ==
This marine species occurs off the Mascarene Islands, Madagascar, the Philippines, the Maldives, Thailand, Guam, the Marshall Islands and off Australia (Northern Territory, Queensland and Western Australia).
