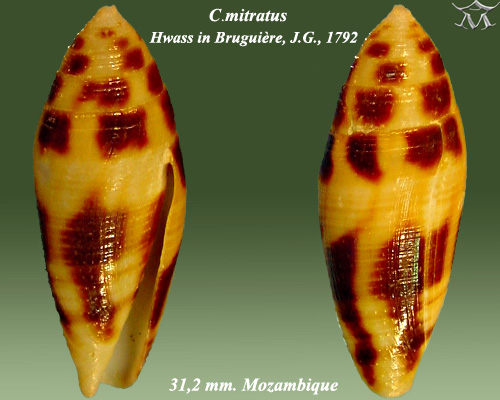
- Apertural and abapertural views of shell of Conus mitratus Hwass in Bruguière, J.G., 1792
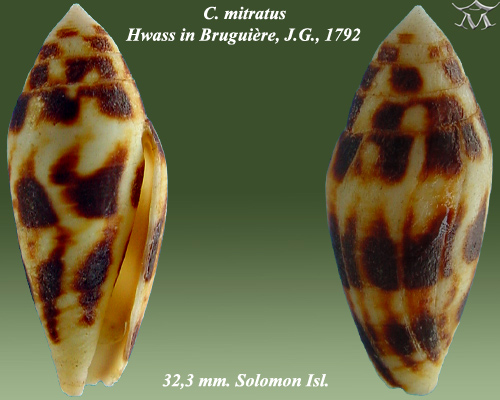

Conservation status
- Least Concern (IUCN 3.1)

Scientific classification
- Kingdom: Animalia
- Phylum: Mollusca
- Class: Gastropoda
- Subclass: Caenogastropoda
- Order: Neogastropoda
- Superfamily: Conoidea
- Family: Conidae
- Genus: Conus
- Species: C. mitratus

Binomial name
- Conus mitratus Hwass in Bruguière, 1792

Synonyms
- Conus (Turriconus) mitratus Hwass in Bruguière, 1792 accepted, alternate representation; Conus mitraeformis (misspelling); Conus mitraeformis var. pupaeformis G. B. Sowerby II, 1870; Gastridium mitratus Salvat, B. & Rives, C. 1975; Hermes (Leporiconus) mitratus Habe, T. 1964; Leporiconus mitratus (Hwass in Bruguière, 1792); Mitraconus mitratus (Hwass in Bruguière, 1792); Turriconus (Mitraconus) mitratus (Hwass in Bruguière, 1792)

= Conus mitratus =

Species of sea snail

Conus mitratus, common name the mitred cone, is a species of sea snails, marine gastropod molluscs in the family Conidae, the cone snails and their allies.

Like all species within the genus Conus, these snails are predatory and venomous. They are capable of stinging humans, therefore live ones should be handled carefully or not at all.

== Description ==
The size of the shell varies between 18 mm and 50 mm. The shell is covered with granulated revolving striae. Its color is white, encircled near the shoulder, on the middle and base by large chestnut maculations, forming three interrupted bands. The spire is maculated with brown.

== Distribution ==
This marine species occurs in the entire tropical Indo-Pacific (not Red Sea, Hawaii); off Australia (Queensland).
