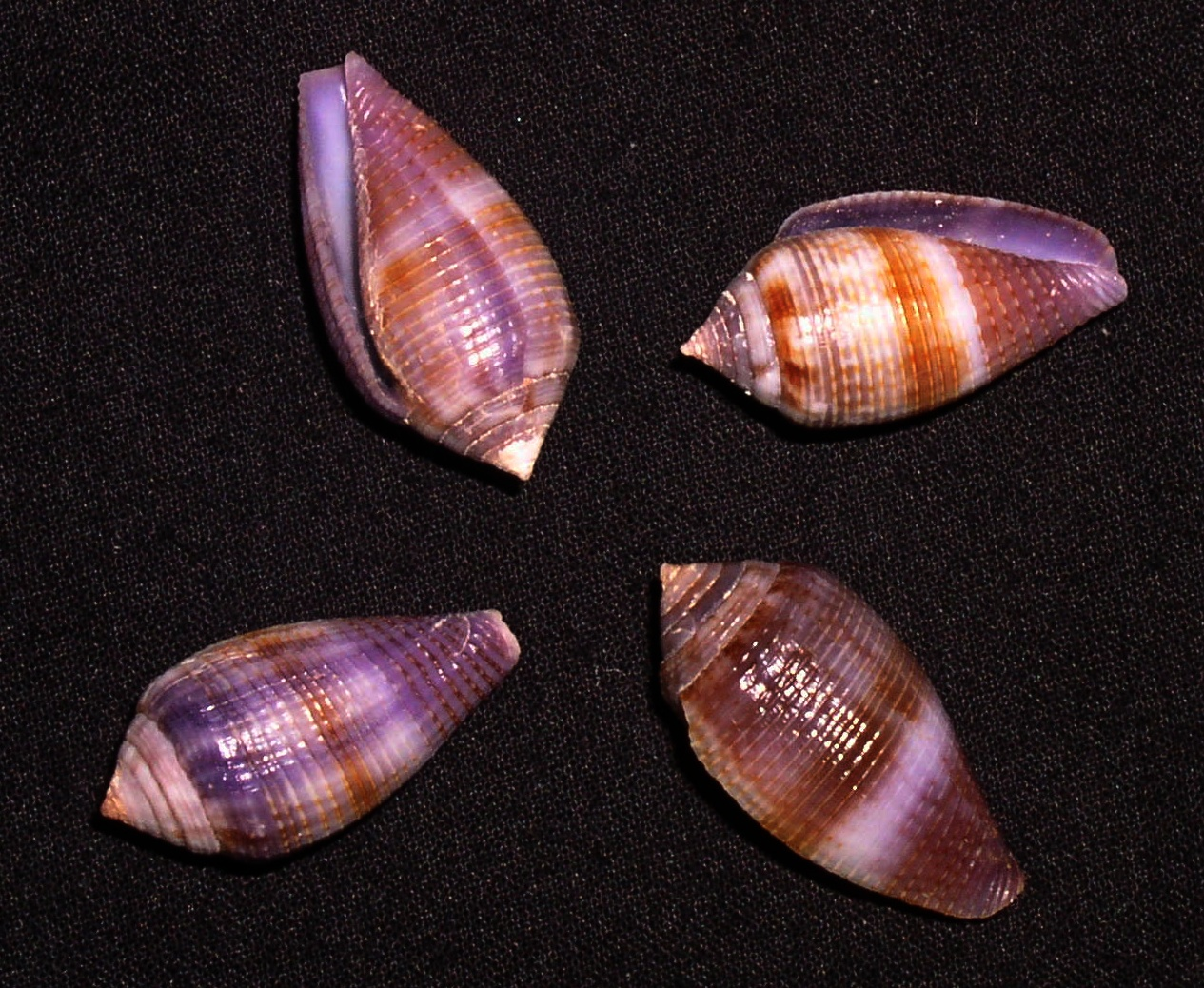
- Four shells of the Acorn cone, Conus glans

Conservation status
- Least Concern (IUCN 3.1)

Scientific classification
- Kingdom: Animalia
- Phylum: Mollusca
- Class: Gastropoda
- Subclass: Caenogastropoda
- Order: Neogastropoda
- Superfamily: Conoidea
- Family: Conidae
- Genus: Conus
- Species: C. glans

Binomial name
- Conus glans Hwass in Bruguière, 1792

Synonyms
- Conus (Leporiconus) glans Hwass in Bruguière, 1792 · accepted, alternate representation; Conus fusiformis Fischer von Waldheim, 1807; Conus glans var. granulata Dautzenberg, 1937; Conus violaceus Link, 1807 (invalid: junior homonym of Conus violaceus Gmelin, 1791); Leporiconus glans (Hwass in Bruguière, 1792)

= Conus glans =

Species of sea snail

Conus glans, common name the acorn cone, is a species of sea snail, a marine gastropod mollusk in the family Conidae, the cone snails and their allies.

These snails are predatory and venomous. They are capable of stinging humans, therefore live ones should be handled carefully or not at all.

Varieties

- Conus glans var. granulata Dautzenberg, 1937: synonym of Conus glans Hwass in Bruguière, 1792
- Conus glans var. tenuigranulata Dautzenberg, 1937: synonym of Conus tenuistriatus G. B. Sowerby II, 1858

== Description ==
The size of the shell varies between 17 mm and 65 mm. The shell is encircled throughout with coarse or fine striae, which are sometimes granular; violaceous or brown, with a few lighter spots on the spire, and usually a light irregular band below the middle of the body whorl. The aperture is violaceous.

== Distribution ==
This species occurs in the Indian Ocean off Madagascar and off Chagos and the Mascarene Basin; in the tropical West Pacific; off India; off Australia (the Northern Territory, Queensland and Western Australia).

== Gallery ==
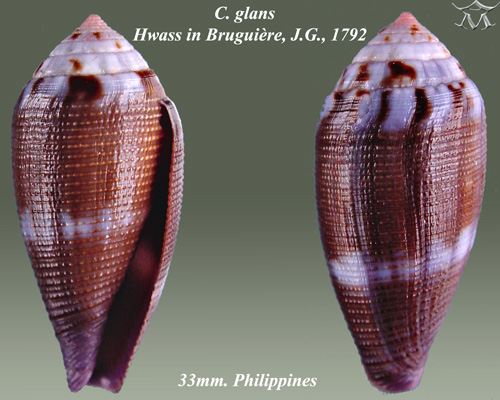
Conus glans Hwass in Bruguière, J.G., 1792

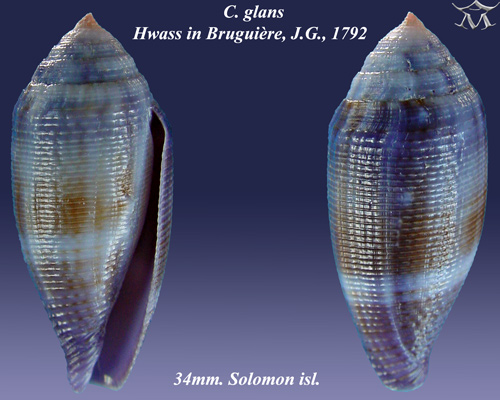
Conus glans Hwass in Bruguière, J.G., 1792
