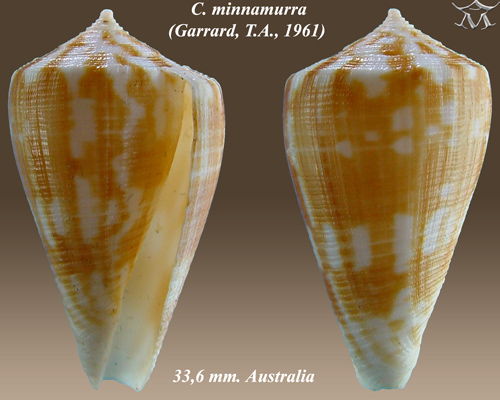
- Apertural and abapertural views of shell of Conus minnamurra (Garrard, T.A., 1961)
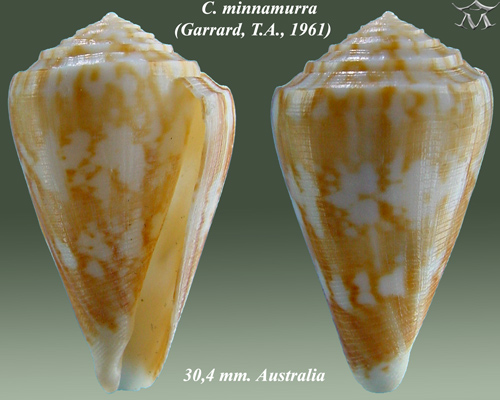

Conservation status
- Least Concern (IUCN 3.1)

Scientific classification
- Kingdom: Animalia
- Phylum: Mollusca
- Class: Gastropoda
- Subclass: Caenogastropoda
- Order: Neogastropoda
- Superfamily: Conoidea
- Family: Conidae
- Genus: Conus
- Species: C. minnamurra

Binomial name
- Conus minnamurra (Garrard, 1961)

Synonyms
- Conus (Eremiconus) minnamurra (Garrard, 1961) · accepted, alternate representation; Eremiconus minnamurra (Garrard, 1961); Mamiconus minnamurra Garrard, 1961 (original combination)

= Conus minnamurra =

Species of sea snail

Conus minnamurra, common name the Minnamurra cone, is a species of sea snail, a marine gastropod mollusk in the family Conidae, the cone snails and their allies.

Like all species within the genus Conus, these snails are predatory and venomous. They are capable of stinging humans, therefore live ones should be handled carefully or not at all.

== Description ==
The size of the shell varies between 25 mm and 40 mm.

== Distribution ==
This marine species is endemic to Australia and occurs off Queensland to New South Wales.
