= Rockford Limestone =

Geologic formation in Indian, United States

- Stratigraphic range: Mississippian
- Type: Formation
- Underlies: New Providence Shale
- Overlies: New Albany Shale

Location
- Region: Illinois, Indiana, Kentucky
- Country: United States

The Rockford Limestone is a geologic formation in the US state of Indiana. It preserves fossils dating back to the Carboniferous period.

== See also ==
- List of fossiliferous stratigraphic units in Indiana
