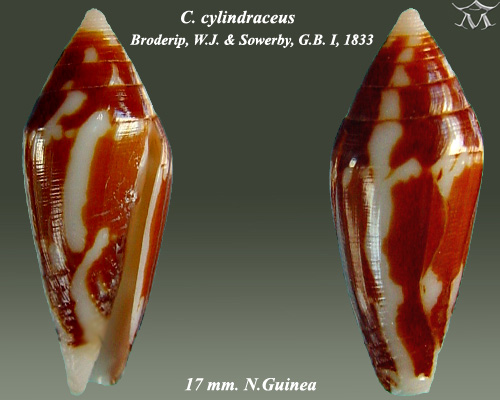
- Apertural and abapertural views of shell of Conus cylindraceus Broderip, W.J. & Sowerby, G.B. I, 1833
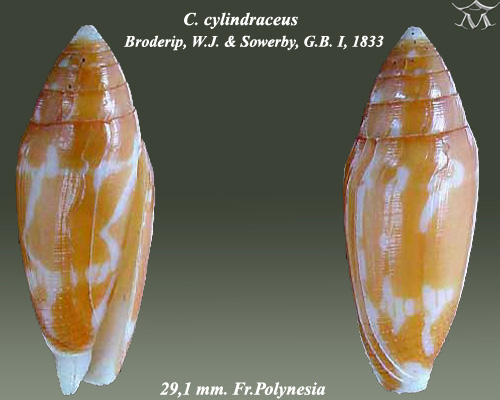

Conservation status
- Least Concern (IUCN 3.1)

Scientific classification
- Kingdom: Animalia
- Phylum: Mollusca
- Class: Gastropoda
- Subclass: Caenogastropoda
- Order: Neogastropoda
- Superfamily: Conoidea
- Family: Conidae
- Genus: Conus
- Species: C. cylindraceus

Binomial name
- Conus cylindraceus Broderip & G. B. Sowerby I, 1830

Synonyms
- Conus (Turriconus) cylindraceus Broderip & G. B. Sowerby I, 1830 accepted, alternate representation; Leporiconus cylindraceus (Broderip & G.B. Sowerby I, 1830); Mitraconus cylindraceus (Broderip & G. B. Sowerby I, 1830); Turriconus (Mitraconus) cylindraceus (Broderip & G. B. Sowerby I, 1830)

= Conus cylindraceus =

Species of sea snail

Conus cylindraceus, common name the cylindrical cone, is a species of sea snail, a marine gastropod mollusk in the family Conidae, the cone snails and their allies.

Like all species within the genus Conus, these snails are predatory and venomous. They are capable of stinging humans, therefore live ones should be handled carefully or not at all.

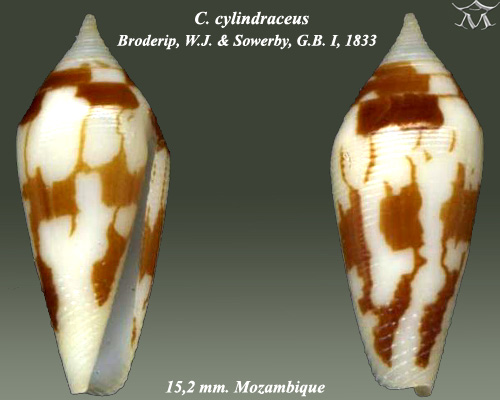
Conus cylindraceus Broderip, W.J. & Sowerby, G.B. I, 1833

== Description ==
The shell measures between 17 and 59 mm in size. It exhibits fine, spiraling lines that become somewhat granular near the base. The shell's color is chestnut, marked by longitudinal white streaks and often featuring both upper and lower bands of white spots.

== Distribution ==
This marine species occurs in the Indian Ocean off Madagascar, Mozambique, the Mascarene Islands; off Indo-China and Indo-Malaysia; off Oceania, off Hawaii and off Western Australia.
