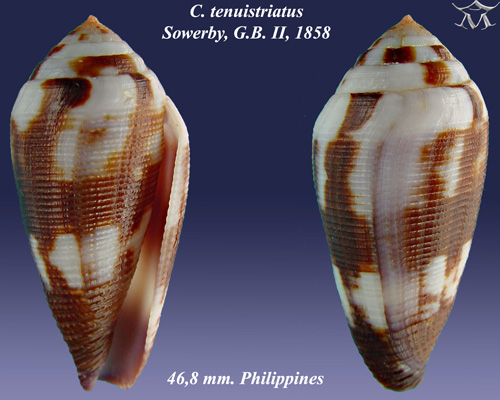
- Apertural and abapertural views of shell of Conus tenuistriatus Sowerby, G.B. II, 1858
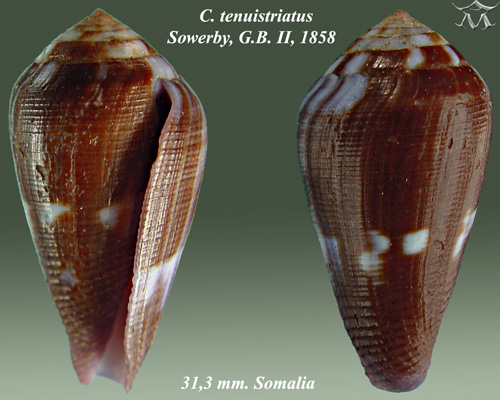

Conservation status
- Least Concern (IUCN 3.1)

Scientific classification
- Kingdom: Animalia
- Phylum: Mollusca
- Class: Gastropoda
- Subclass: Caenogastropoda
- Order: Neogastropoda
- Superfamily: Conoidea
- Family: Conidae
- Genus: Conus
- Species: C. tenuistriatus

Binomial name
- Conus tenuistriatus G. B. Sowerby II, 1858

Synonyms
- Conus (Leporiconus) tenuistriatus G. B. Sowerby II, 1858 · accepted, alternate representation; Conus glans var. tenuigranulata Dautzenberg, 1937; Gastridium tenuistriatus Salvat, B. & Rives, C. 1975; Leporiconus tenuistriatus (G. B. Sowerby II, 1858)

= Conus tenuistriatus =

Species of sea snail

Conus tenuistriatus, common name the thin-line cone, is a species of sea snail, a marine gastropod mollusk in the family Conidae, the cone snails and their allies.

Like all species within the genus Conus, these snails are predatory and venomous. They are capable of stinging humans, therefore live ones should be handled carefully or not at all.

== Description ==
The size of the shell varies between 22 mm and 68 mm. The shell is encircled throughout with fine striae, which are sometimes granular. Its color is violaceous or brown, with a few lighter spots on the spire, and usually a light irregular band below the middle of the body whorl. The aperture is violaceous. The shell has many of the characteristics of Conus glans Hwass in Bruguière, 1792

== Distribution ==
This marine species occurs in the Indian Ocean (not Red Sea); from the Philippines and Indonesia to Papua New Guinea, off French Polynesia and the Marshall Islands; off Western Australia.
