= New Harmony Group =

- Stratigraphic range: Devonian
- Type: Group
- Sub-units: Clear Creek Chert; Backbone Limestone; Grassy Knob Chert
- Underlies: Jeffersonville Limestone
- Thickness: 0'-900'

Lithology
- Primary: Limestone, chert
- Other: Dolomite

Location
- Region: Indiana
- Country: United States

The New Harmony Group is located in the State of Indiana. It is made up of three formations, the Grassy Knob Chert, the Backbone Limestone and Clear Creek Chert. It is Lower Devonian in age.

== Stratigraphy ==
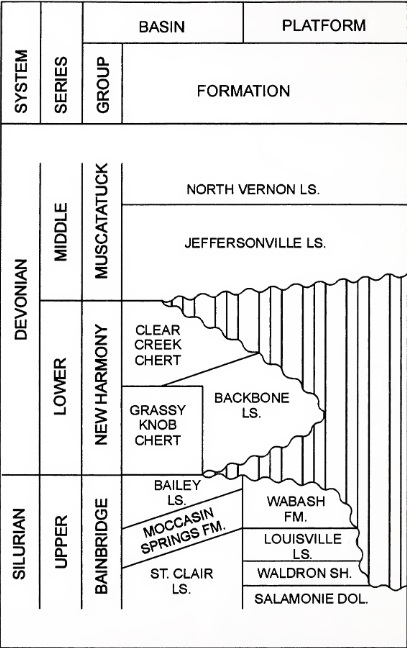
Indiana Stratigraphy: Modified from Becker & Droste (1978) and Droste & Shaver(1987)

Eastward the group is made up primarily of the Backbone Limestone. It is very light in color, and medium to course grained limestone. The limestone itself is bioclastic. Westward it is very fine grained to medium grained limestone and dolomite with cherty inclusions. To almost pure chert. The cherty facies are the Clear Creek and Grassy Knob formations. There are tongues of chert and limestone that represent facies of each formation interlayed between one another.

=== Clear Creek Chert ===
The Clear Creek Chert is light yellowish grey to olive grey cherty limestone. Grading to predominately chert moving westward.

=== Backbone Limestone ===
The Backbone Limestone is light yellowish grey to yellowish grey. It is fine grained to course grained. There are minor cherty inclusions within the formation. There are micro and macro fossils that have been correlated with the Oriskany Formation in New York State.

=== Grassy Knob Chert ===
The Grassy Knob Chert upper sections are yellowish grey to light olive grey limestone, interbedded with cherty inclusions. Moving lower the amount of chert increases and the color changed to light grey with some olive grey mottling. This formation is generally the same age as the Oriskany Formation of the Appalachian Basin.
