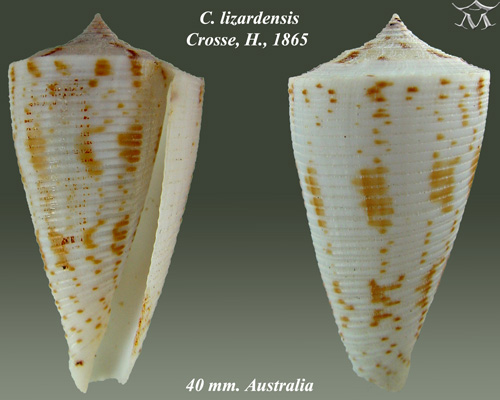
- Apertural and abapertural views of shell of Conus lizardensis Crosse, H., 1865
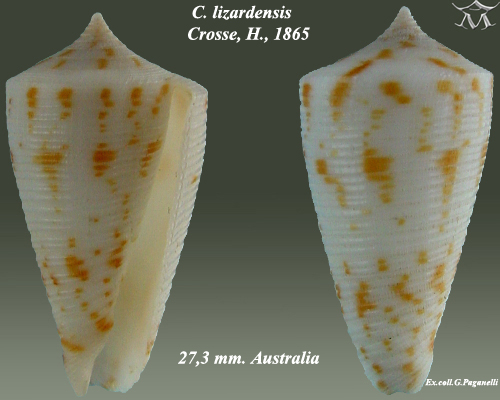

Conservation status
- Least Concern (IUCN 3.1)

Scientific classification
- Kingdom: Animalia
- Phylum: Mollusca
- Class: Gastropoda
- Subclass: Caenogastropoda
- Order: Neogastropoda
- Superfamily: Conoidea
- Family: Conidae
- Genus: Conus
- Species: C. lizardensis

Binomial name
- Conus lizardensis Crosse, 1865

Synonyms
- Conus (Eremiconus) lizardensis Crosse, 1865 · accepted, alternate representation; Conus sibogae Schepman, 1913; Conus (Asperi) mucronatus sibogae Schepman, M.M. 1913; Eremiconus lizardensis (Crosse, 1865); Phasmoconus lizardensis (Crosse, 1865)

= Conus lizardensis =

Species of sea snail

Conus lizardensis, common name the Siboga cone, is a species of sea snail, a marine gastropod mollusk in the family Conidae, the cone snails and their allies.

Like all species within the genus Conus, these snails are predatory and venomous. They are capable of stinging humans, therefore live ones should be handled carefully or not at all.

This species was named after Lizard Island, NE Australia.

== Description ==
Conus lizardensis is part of a species complex including C. albellus, C. limpusi and C. colmani, that needs re-evaluation. For conservation implications, all are here tentatively listed as distinct. The size of the shell varies between 25 mm and 55 mm. It shows a twofold character of the spiral ridges and strong raised lines of increment. The top of the volutions have a fine sculpture.

== Distribution ==
This marine species occurs off Indonesia, New Guinea and Australia (Northern Territory, Queensland, Western Australia).
