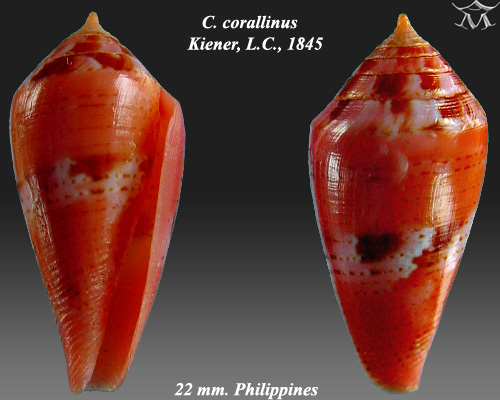
- Apertural and abapertural views of shell of Conus corallinus Kiener, L.C., 1845
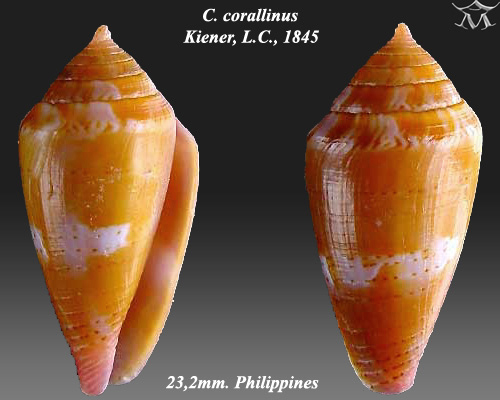

Conservation status
- Least Concern (IUCN 3.1)

Scientific classification
- Kingdom: Animalia
- Phylum: Mollusca
- Class: Gastropoda
- Subclass: Caenogastropoda
- Order: Neogastropoda
- Superfamily: Conoidea
- Family: Conidae
- Genus: Conus
- Species: C. corallinus

Binomial name
- Conus corallinus Kiener, 1845

Synonyms
- Conus (Splinoconus) corallinus Kiener, 1847 · accepted, alternate representation; Isoconus corallinus (Kiener, 1847); Leporiconus corallinus (Kiener, 1847)

= Conus corallinus =

Species of sea snail

Conus corallinus is a species of sea snail, a marine gastropod mollusk in the family Conidae, the cone snails and their allies.

Like all species within the genus Conus, these snails are predatory and venomous. They are capable of stinging humans, therefore live ones should be handled carefully or not at all.

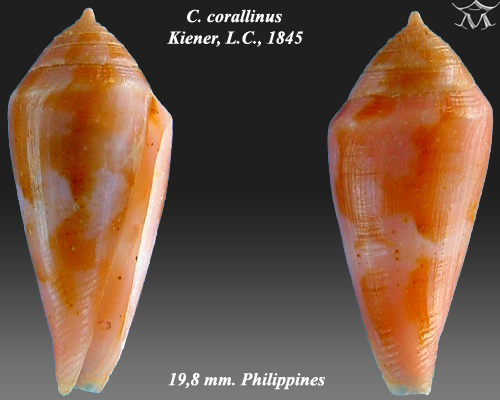
Conus corallinus Kiener, L.C., 1845

== Description ==
The size of the shell varies between 15 mm and 37.5 mm.

The shell is normally pale grey to pink, but may have flecks of orange and brown.

== Distribution ==
This marine species occurs off Philippines, off Okinawa, Japan and New Caledonia.
