= Karagandoceras =

Karagandoceras Temporal range: Lower Mississippian

Scientific classification
- Domain: Eukaryota
- Kingdom: Animalia
- Phylum: Mollusca
- Class: Cephalopoda
- Subclass: †Ammonoidea
- Order: †Goniatitida
- Family: †Karagandoceratidae
- Genus: †Karagandoceras; Librovitch, 1940

Genus of molluscs (fossil)

Karagandoceras is an ammonoid genus belonging to the goniatid family Karagandoceratidae that lived during the early Mississippian (lower Carboniferous).

Karagandoceras has an involute, lenticular shell, with an acute ventral margin. The ventral lobe of the suture is wide with subparallel to divergent sides, divided by a median saddle with a relatively wide median lobe.

Karagandoceratids, which include Karagandoceras and Mesonoceras are a rare offshoot of the Prionorceratinae that differ from their parent group by possession of an acute ventral margin and an increasingly trifid ventral lobe.
