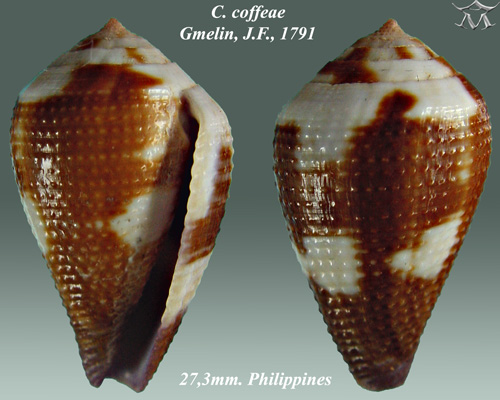
- Apertural and abapertural views of shell of Conus coffeae Gmelin, J.F., 1791
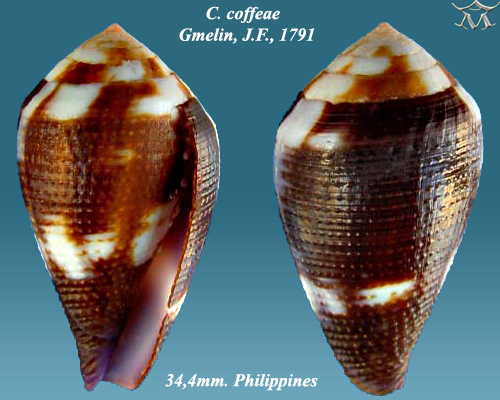

Conservation status
- Least Concern (IUCN 3.1)

Scientific classification
- Kingdom: Animalia
- Phylum: Mollusca
- Class: Gastropoda
- Subclass: Caenogastropoda
- Order: Neogastropoda
- Superfamily: Conoidea
- Family: Conidae
- Genus: Conus
- Species: C. coffeae

Binomial name
- Conus coffeae Gmelin, 1791

Synonyms
- Conus (Leporiconus) coffeae Gmelin, 1791 accepted, alternate representation; Conus caffer Röding, 1798; Conus fabula G. B. Sowerby II, 1833; Conus scabriusculus Dillwyn, 1817; Cucullus caffer Röding, 1798 (junior homonym of Conus caffer Krauss, 1848); Leporiconus coffeae (Gmelin, 1791)

= Conus coffeae =

Species of sea snail

Conus coffeae, common name the coffee cone, is a species of sea snail, a marine gastropod mollusk in the family Conidae, the cone snails and their allies.

Like all species within the genus Conus, these snails are predatory and venomous. They are capable of stinging humans, therefore live ones should be handled carefully or not at all.

== Description ==
The size of the shell varies between 18 mm and 51 mm. The yellowish brown shell is white-banded in the middle and less distinctly so at the shoulder and the base of the body whorl. These bands are sometimes maculated, like the spire, with chestnut, and there are, on the darker portions, occasional faint chestnut revolving lines.

== Distribution ==
This marine species occurs in the Central and Western Pacific; off Australia (New South Wales, Northern Territory, Queensland, Western Australia)
