= Dieter Korn =

- Born: 1958 (age 67–68); Sundern (Westphalia)
- Known for: Ammonite Evolution
- Scientific career
- Fields: Paleontology (paleomalocology)
- Workplaces: Museum für Naturkunde, Berlin

Dr. Dieter Korn (born 1958) is a German scientist and paleontologist specializing in research on ammonites and goniatites. He received his Ph.D. in 1996 from the University of Tübingen and is employed by the Museum für Naturkunde in Berlin, Germany, in the Leibniz Institute for Research on Evolution and Biodiversity (Humboldt University). Dr Korn has published or coauthored over 100 papers since 1979, including the description of numerous new species of cephalopods.
