= Geology of Tennessee =

The geology of Tennessee is as diverse as its landscapes. Politically, Tennessee is broken up into three Grand Divisions: East, Middle, and West Tennessee. Physically, Tennessee is also separated into three main types of landforms: river valley plain, highlands and basins, and mountains.

== Paleozoic ==
Most of the sedimentary rock across Middle Tennessee was deposited from the Ordovician to the Mississippian, roughly between 400 and 300 million years ago. The sediment was primarily deep ocean limestones with some shale layers. Mississippian limestones are generally thicker and more cherty than those of the Ordovician, and additionally. In the Ordovician, the Appalachian Mountains began to form and by the end of the Paleozoic were tall peaks. During the Pennsylvanian, the Cumberland Plateau formed along the edge of the Appalachians as beach and shore sediments, primarily sandstone today.

== Mesozoic ==
Most Mesozoic sediments were deposited in West Tennessee, along the present course of the Tennessee River. The Coon Creek Formation is one of these, deposited as a sandy shoreline along the Mississippi embayment during the Cretaceous. Many large sea creatures, including mosasaurs and plesiosaurs as well as ammonites ruled the seas that covered the area. Because this area was underwater at this time, there are no land dinosaurs in the fossil record. The Appalachians to the east also experienced erosion at this time and were smoothed down to near their current elevation.

== Cenozoic ==
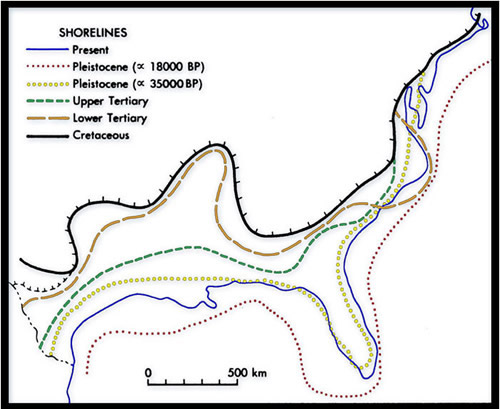
Level of the ocean drops over millennia creating recent formations

By the Cenozoic, the sea level had dropped to its current level, and the North American continent dried out. The Mississippi River as well as the Tennessee and Cumberland Rivers formed and cut deep into the valleys. The Nashville Basin, which in reality is a geologic dome, was pushed up from underneath by a mantle plume, exposing softer strata that with additional erosion on the Highland Rim surrounding the basin expanded the size of the basin. The basin is likely to continue widening far into the future.

Most Cenozoic deposits occur in West Tennessee near the Mississippi embayment as sands and silts.

== Geological formations ==
- Cretaceous
  - Coon Creek Formation
- Pennsylvanian
  - Cumberland Plateau
  - Crooked Fork Group, including Wartburg Sandstone, Glenmary Shale, Coalfield Sandstone, Burnt Mill Shale, Crossville Sandstone, Dorton Shale
  - Crab Orchard Mountains Group, including Rockcastle Conglomerate, Vandever Formation, Newton Sandstone, Whitwell Shale, and Sewanee Conglomerate
  - Gizzard Group, including Signal Point Shale, Warren Point Sandstone, and Raccoon Mountain Formation
- Mississippian
  - Pennington Formation
  - Bangor Limestone
  - Hartselle Sandstone
  - Ste. Genevieve Limestone
  - St. Louis Limestone
  - Warsaw Formation
  - Fort Payne Formation
- Devonian
  - Chattanooga Shale
- Silurian
- Ordovician
  - Richmond Group (geologic feature)
  - Lebanon Limestone
  - Ridley Limestone
  - Bigby-Cannon Limestone
  - Leipers Formation
  - Catheys Formation
  - Pegram Formation
  - Hermitage Formation
  - Laurel Limestone
  - Murfreesboro Limestone
  - Pierce Limestone

== See also ==
- Basic geologic features of each state
- Geology of the Appalachians
