= Window Cliffs State Natural Area =

Protected area of Tennessee, United States

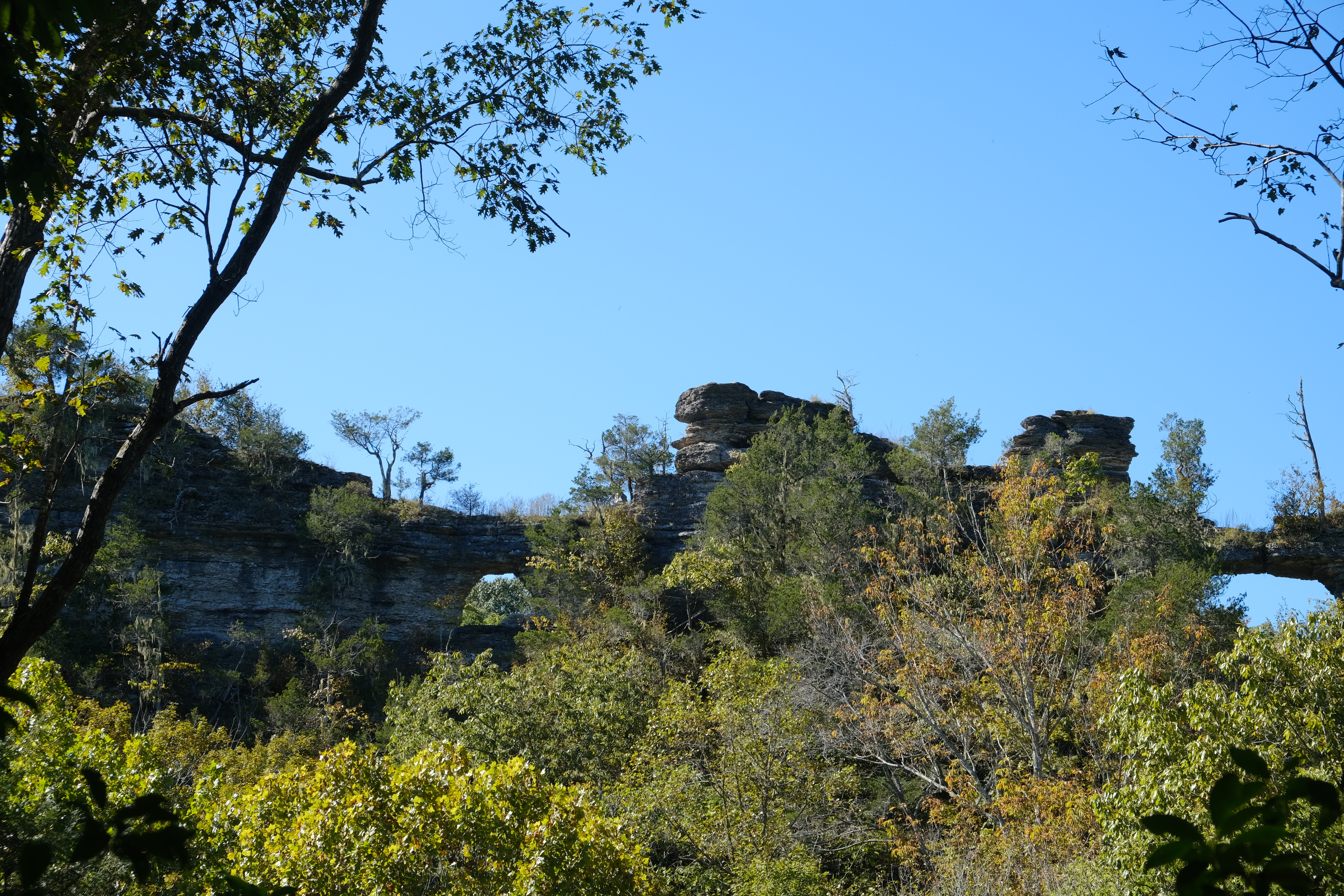

- Location within Tennessee
- Location: Putnam County, Tennessee, U.S.
- Nearest city: Cookeville, Tennessee
- Coordinates: 36°03′46″N 85°36′28″W
- Area: 275 acres (111 ha)
- Designated: 2014
- Owner: Tennessee Department of Environment and Conservation (TDEC)
- Administrator: Burgess Falls State Park
- Website: Window Cliffs State Natural Area

The Window Cliffs State Natural Area covers 275 acres (111 ha) in Putnam County, Tennessee, near Cookeville. The Window Cliffs are a prominent group of natural bridges in a narrow 200-foot-tall (61 m) ridge in the neck of a meander of Cane Creek. The Window Cliffs were an acclaimed destination in the nineteenth and early twentieth centuries. The area contains several state-listed endangered plants.

It was given to the state of Tennessee by the Land Trust for Tennessee, being designed as Tennessee's 85th State Natural Area in 2014. Nearby is also Burgess Falls State Natural Area.

The Window Cliffs lie within the Eastern Highland Rim above the Central Basin, and are accessible by trail. The trail passes through old fields and successional forest. Their address is 8400 Old Cane Creek Road, Baxter, Tennessee.

== Geology ==
This geological formation is underlain by Mississippian and Ordovician aged sedimentary limestone, which continues to erode, creating the titular windows.

Most of the visible rocks in area belong to the Fort Payne Formation formed in the Mississippian period.

It is highly resistant to erosion, and acts as a caprock to hold up the escarpment between the Rim and the Central Basin to the northwest. Of the units described here, the Fort Payne is by far the most resistant to erosion and generally forms the steep valley walls along the incised streams.

Below is Chattanooga Shale is a carbonaceous, fissile shale about 8 m (26 ft) thick and crops out in settings similar to the Leipers–Catheys.

Bottom is The Leipers Limestone Leipers–Catheys Catheys Formation unit contains coarse-grained, fine-grained, and argillaceous limestone and has a maximum exposed thickness of 45 m (148 ft). In the incised stream valleys, this unit crops out at the base of the slopes and on the valley floor.

== Biology ==
The Window Cliffs' flora was inventoried by Tennessee Tech in cooperation with Tennessee Department of Environment and Conservation (TDEC) in 2016.

The cliff face plant community is classified as a Central Interior Calcareous Cliff and Talus plant community.

The best quality forest communities in the natural area consist of oak and hickory uplands with American beech and eastern hemlock in the coves. One study of Eastern hemlocks in this area gave an average age of 64 years.

The cliffs are one of only two known locations in Tennessee of the state-endangered species plains muhly. It is a native grass that grows in clumps. It is commonly found on the shortgrass prairie habitat in the western plains of central Canada and the central United States.

White cedar occurs at the base of the cliff. While rare in Tennessee, listed as a state endangered species, it occurs most often in eastern Canada and the northeastern U.S.

== History ==
In the early 19th century, the French Naturalist, Charles Alexandre Lesueur, visited the area and named it "Cane Creek Bluff." His sketch of the feature is displayed in the Muséum d'Histoire Naturelle du Havre in Le Havre, France. It was a large enough community to have a post office in the late 19th century.

It was featured in the story "Jack and the Mountain Pink" by Sherwood Bonner in Harper's Weekly in 1881.

The Land Trust for Tennessee purchased this natural area from different private landowners in 2013, 2014 and 2015. The Land Trust then transferred the land the state of Tennessee. The site is managed by Burgess Falls State Natural Area/State Park. It officially opened to the public April 7, 2017.

== See also ==
- Burgess Falls
- Ozone Falls State Natural Area
- Cummins Falls State Park
- Scott's Gulf
