= Upper Cumberland AVA =

Viticultural area in Tennessee

Coordinates: 35°59′20″N 85°0′23″W

Upper Cumberland
- Wine region
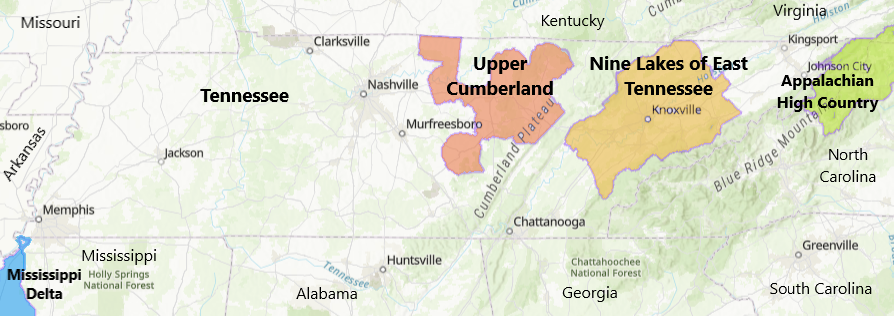
- Type: American Viticultural Area
- Year established: 2024
- Years of wine industry: 216
- Country: United States
- Part of: Tennessee
- Other regions in Tennessee: Appalachian High Country AVA, Mississippi Delta AVA, Nine Lakes of East Tennessee AVA
- Growing season: 212 days
- Climate region: Region III-V
- Heat units: 3,418.05-4,376.45 GDD units
- Precipitation (annual average): 50.02 in (1,270.51 mm)
- Soil conditions: Ultisols, Alfisols and Inceptisols soils
- Total area: 2.18 million acres (3,410 sq mi)
- Size of planted vineyards: 71 acres (29 ha)
- No. of vineyards: 55
- Grapes produced: Chardonnay, Concord, Cabernet Sauvignon, Merlot, Muscadine, Niagara, Pinot Gris, Riesling, Vidal Blanc, Zinfandel
- No. of wineries: 9

Upper Cumberland is an American Viticultural Area (AVA) located in Middle Tennessee and expands all or portions of the following eight counties: Cumberland, Fentress, Macon, Putnam, Overton, Smith, Warren, and White. The wine appellation was established as the nation's 273^{rd} and the state's third AVA on May 15, 2024 by the Alcohol and Tobacco Tax and Trade Bureau (TTB), Treasury after reviewing the petition submitted by the Appalachian Region Wine Producers Association, proposing a viticultural area named "Upper Cumberland."
The viticultural area encircles the cities of Cookeville and McMinnville, lies east of Nashville and Murfreesboro, and encompasses approximately 2.18 million acres (3,406 sq mi) with 55 vineyards cultivating over 71 acres (29 ha) and sourcing nine wineries. There is at least one vineyard in each county within the AVA, demonstrating that commercial viticulture and wine-making occurs throughout the entire AVA with additional new vineyard and winery projects in various stages of development. This is a relatively new region for modern viticulture development but grape growing and winemaking have a long substantial history in the area.

== History ==
Tennessee has a long history of habitation. The unique geography of Tennessee dictated the pattern of settlement. The region's first inhabitants were nomadic Paleo-Indians hunters between 12,000 and 15,000 years ago. Their descendants settled on the many river terraces located throughout the state then expanded outward establishing permanent settlements which reached a peak of prehistoric cultural development between 700 and 1300 AD. The first migrant explorers arrived in 1540 initiating a period of European exploration and exploitation. For over two hundred years the indigenous populations co-existed with the small numbers of settlers, frontiersmen, and explorers in the Upper Cumberland area. The use of the name "Cumberland" came from an English explorer Dr. Thomas Walker who named the Cumberland River after the Duke of Cumberland in 1750, and it soon became an oft-used name for geographic entities, including the Cumberland Plateau and the region known as Upper Cumberland. The dramatic change occurred after 1775 when Daniel Boone opened a wagon route, the Wilderness Road, between the eastern and western United States via the Cumberland Gap, a passageway through the Cumberland Mountains between Kentucky and Tennessee. The Wilderness Road forked soon after the Gap, with the southern route leading directly into the Upper Cumberland. These first settlers in the Upper Cumberland region came from Virginia and North Carolina and were primarily of English and Scotch-Irish ancestry.

Agriculture was the driving force in the settlement and development of Tennessee and the Upper Cumberland. European settlers were quick to introduce grape growing and wine-making to Tennessee. In 1880, the Tennessee Department of Agriculture estimated there were 1,128 acres (456 ha) of grapes growing in the state. Mark Twain, in his autobiography, reminisces about his father's estate in Upper Cumberland region round about Jamestown, which "produced a wild grape of a promising sort." Those grapes were sent to a renowned vintner in Ohio who opined "that[they] would make as good wine as his Catawbas." However, Prohibition slowed or halted grape production in Tennessee. Viticulture rebounded in the later decades of the 20th century. In 1980, the first post-prohibition wineries were licensed and by 2015, Tennessee was estimated to cultivate over 1,000 acres (400 ha) of wine grapes with 70 wineries. The first modern winery in Tennessee, Highland Manor Winery, is located in Upper Cumberland AVA.

== Terroir ==
Upper Cumberland AVA is located within the watershed of the Cumberland and Tennessee Rivers or their tributaries, which traditionally includes a total of 14 counties. The Upper Cumberland AVA proposal originally included all 14 of these counties. At the request of TTB, the petitioners agreed to exclude those counties that currently lack commercial viticulture, leaving eight counties to define the AVA. However, TTB said it may consider future petitions to modify the AVA boundaries if commercial viticulture develops in any excluded counties. According to the petition, the distinguishing features of Upper Cumberland AVA are its topography, elevation, soils, and climate from the surrounding areas.

=== Topography ===
Upper Cumberland AVA covers portions of three distinct geographical regions: the western portion of the Cumberland Plateau on its eastern flank, the Eastern Highland Ridge in the middle, and the eastern portion of the Outer Central Basin defining the western border. To the east, the western portion of the Cumberland Plateau and was formed from layers of sedimentary rocks that were deposited when an ancient ocean encompassed the area. The average elevations in the eastern region range from 1,500 to 1,800 feet (457–549 m). The bedrock of the middle portion of the AVA is composed primarily of Mississippian-aged St. Louis and Warsaw limestones with Fort Payne chert underlain by Chattanooga shale. The middle region is located on a "cuesta" known as the Eastern Highland Rim. As the North American and African protocontinents came together, the sediment and rock stuck between them and the region of what is now the AVA was uplifted, forming the Cumberland Plateau. Average elevations within this portion of the AVA range from 1,000 to 1,800 feet (305–549 m). The middle portion of the Upper Cumberland AVA is located on the Eastern Highland Rim. This region is composed mainly of various limestones, chert, and shale and contains elevations ranging from 600 to 1,000 feet (180–300 m). The western region of the Upper Cumberland AVA is mostly an escarpment located on the Outer Central Basin of Middle Tennessee with underlying rocks of limestone, chert, and shale which the petition defines as a long, steep slope, especially one at the edge of a plateau or a slope separating areas of land at different heights. The petition did not include a range of elevations for the western region of the AVA but noted that the elevations are higher than the average elevations of the Inner Central Basin region located farther to the west. The petition notes that the uplifted elevations of the AVA allow more direct and concentrated sunlight particularly UV light into the vineyards than in vineyards at lower elevations. According to the petition, for every 1,000 feet (305 m) of elevation, the level of UV light increases between 10 and 20 percent. As a result of greater levels of UV rays, grapes develop thicker skins which increases the color concentration and tannins in the resulting wines.

=== Climate ===
The petition provided climate data, specifically annual minimum and maximum temperatures, growing season mean temperatures, growing season length, growing degree days 1 (GDDs), USDA plant hardiness zones, and annual precipitation amounts for the Upper Cumberland AVA and the surrounding regions. According to the petition, the AVA has a climate that is suitable for growing a wide variety of wine grapes, including vinifera, hybrid, native, and muscadine varietals currently growing within the AVA. The region has an average growing season length of 212 days, a mean growing degree temperature of 67.5 °F (19.7 °C), and an average annual precipitation amount of 50.02 inches (1,270.51 mm). The area south of the AVA has a generally warmer climate, longer growing season, and higher annual precipitation amount than the AVA. In the area east of the AVA, the mean growing season temperature is similar to the AVA, but the growing season is slightly shorter, and the annual precipitation amount is slightly higher. The area west of the AVA has a shorter mean growing season temperature and a higher mean annual precipitation amount. USDA Plant Hardiness Zones ranging from 7a to 7b. GDD accumulations range from 3,134.4 to 4,226.2, and Winkler Regions range from Zone III to Zone V

=== Soils ===
The petition states that there are three types of soil orders in the AVA. It defines Ultisols soils as "strongly leached, acid forest soils with relatively low fertility." Inceptisols soils "exhibit minimal horizon development" and "lack features characteristic of other soil orders." They are often found in mountainous regions. Alfisols soils are moderately-leached soils with relatively high native fertility. The petition notes the eastern portion of the AVA contains Ultisols and Inceptisols soils that are moderately deep, dominantly well-drained, and strongly acidic. These soils have an mesic soil moisture regime, meaning that water moves down through the soil at some time in most years, and the amount of soil moisture plus rainfall is approximately equal to or exceeds the amount of evapotranspiration. The middle portion of the AVA contains Ultisols, Inceptisols, and Alfisols soils that are moderately-to-very deep, moderately well-drained, and loamy or clayey. These soils are in the udic soil moisture regime and are also predominantly in the thermic soil temperature regime, meaning that soil temperatures at a depth of 20 inches (51 cm) range from 59 to 70 °F (15–21 °C). The western portion of the AVA contains Ultisols, Inceptisols, and Alfisols soil orders. Soils in this portion have a thermic soil temperature regime and udic soil moisture regime, similar to the soils in the middle portion of the AVA. The petition notes that the acidic and well-drained soils of the Upper Cumberland AVA allow grapes to retain acidity as they ripen, resulting in "brighter, more acidic finished wines." According to the petition, to the north and south of the AVA, the soils are similar to the soils within the AVA. Soils east of the AVA are almost exclusively Ultisols soils that generally have a thermic soil temperature regime and an udic soil moisture regime. Soils west of the AVA include Mollisols soils, which are found in grassland ecosystems and are not found in the AVA. Additionally, the region west of the AVA does not contain as many Ultisols soils as in the area.

== Viticulture ==
Upper Cumberland viticulture was vibrant decades before it was recognized as the country's 237th AVA. Along Upper Cumberland back roads, the Upper Cumberland Wine Trail traces a route through historic towns and scenic Tennessee countrysides, encircling Cookeville and Crossville, to the wineries and vineyards in the region, i.e., Cellar 53 in Brush Creek, Chestnut Hill in Crossville, DelMonaco in Baxter, Highland Manor in Jamestown, Holly Ridge in Livingston, Northfield in Sparta, Stonehaus in Crossville. Historic Granville hosts the Upper Cumberland Wine Festival annually in the Spring.

== See also ==
- Tennessee Wine
