= Carters Limestone =

Geologic formation in Tennessee, USA preserving fossils from the Ordovician period

- Stratigraphic range: Middle Ordovician
- Type: Formation
- Unit of: Lower and Upper Members
- Underlies: Hermitage Formation
- Overlies: Lebanon Limestone
- Thickness: 9–28 m (30–92 ft)

Lithology
- Primary: Thin-bedded to massive limestone
- Other: Thin shale and bentonite beds

Location
- Region: Central Basin, Tennessee
- Country: United States
- Extent: Central Tennessee

Type section
- Named by: J. M. Stafford

The Carters Limestone is a geologic formation in Tennessee. It preserves fossils dating back to the Ordovician period. The Carters contains abundant invertebrate fossils, including corals, stromatoporoids, brachiopods and bryozoans, mollusk (gastropods, bivalves and orthoconic cephalopods) and trilobites. Trace fossils also occur. The unit has several volcanic ash (bentonite) beds and is known to have isolated reef development.

== See also ==
- List of fossiliferous stratigraphic units in Tennessee
- Paleontology in Tennessee
