= Wells Creek crater =

Impact crater in Tennessee

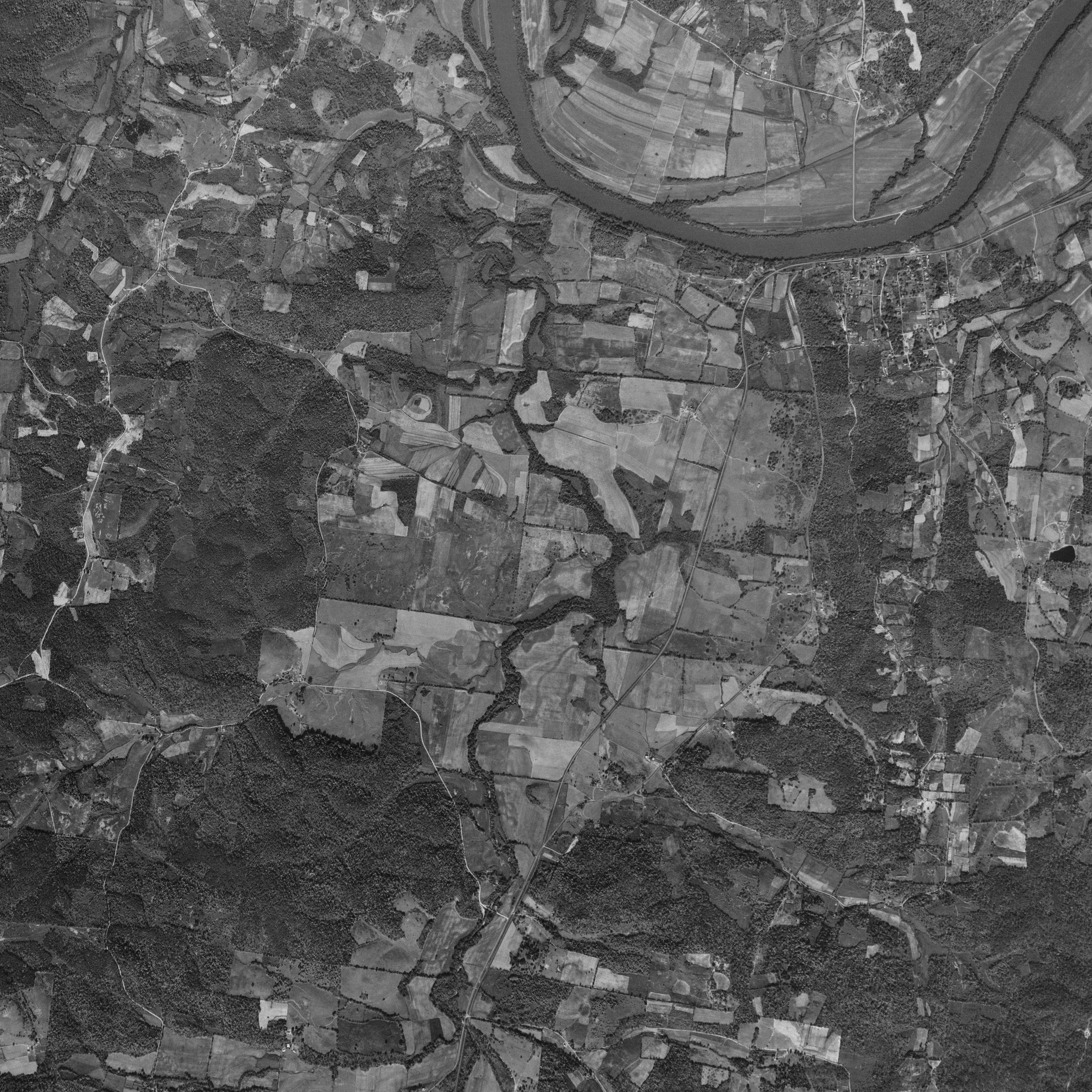
- Central Wells Creek crater in 1953

- Location within the United States Location within Tennessee
- Location: Cumberland City, Tennessee, Houston & Stewart Counties, Tennessee, United States; 36°22′40″N 87°39′30″W

Impact crater structure
- Confidence: Confirmed
- Diameter: 12 km (7.5 mi)
- Depth: (200 Ma: ~2,640 feet) (Today: ~550 feet)
- Age: 200±100 Ma; Mesozoic
- Exposed: Yes
- Drilled: Yes
- Access: Private

Wells Creek is an impact crater located near Cumberland City, Tennessee. It is 12 kilometers (7.5 mi) in diameter and the age is estimated to be 200±100 Ma (million years old), placing it in the Jurassic or a neighboring period. The crater is exposed to the surface. The center of the crater contains some of the finest shatter cones in the world. Many have been collected and are on display around the world.

The crater contains a central uplift where Cambro-Ordovician rocks of the Wells Creek Dolomite and Knox Group are exposed. These rocks are surrounded by concentric exposures of Ordovician, Silurian, and Devonian rocks. Beyond the uplift are Mississippian rocks of the Chattanooga Shale, Fort Payne Formation, Warsaw Limestone, and St. Louis Limestone. Radial faults are abundant in the central uplift area. Sets of concentric faults surround the central uplift and three rings of them bound the outer structure.

== Gallery ==
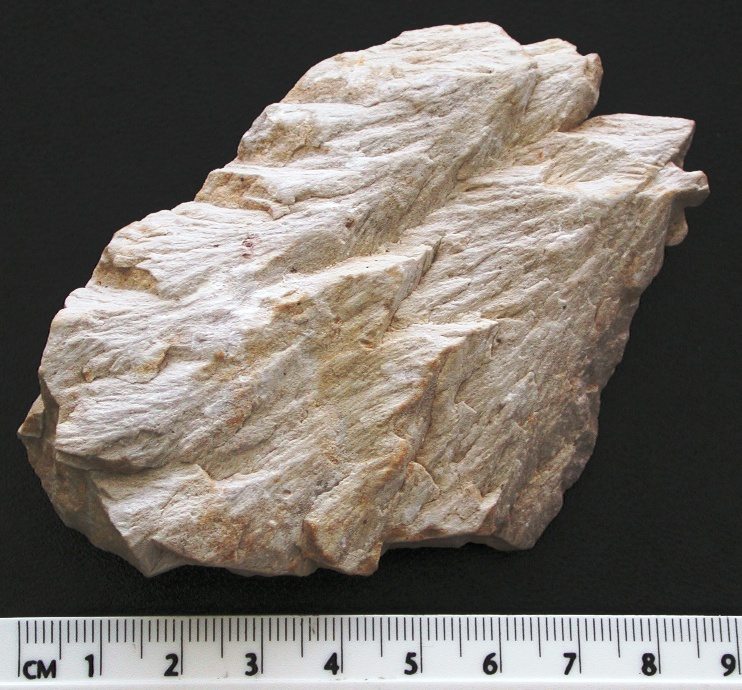
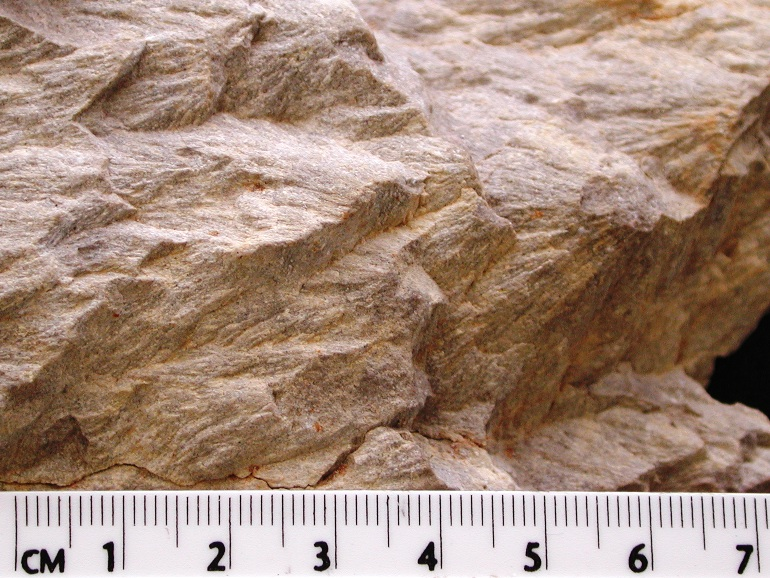
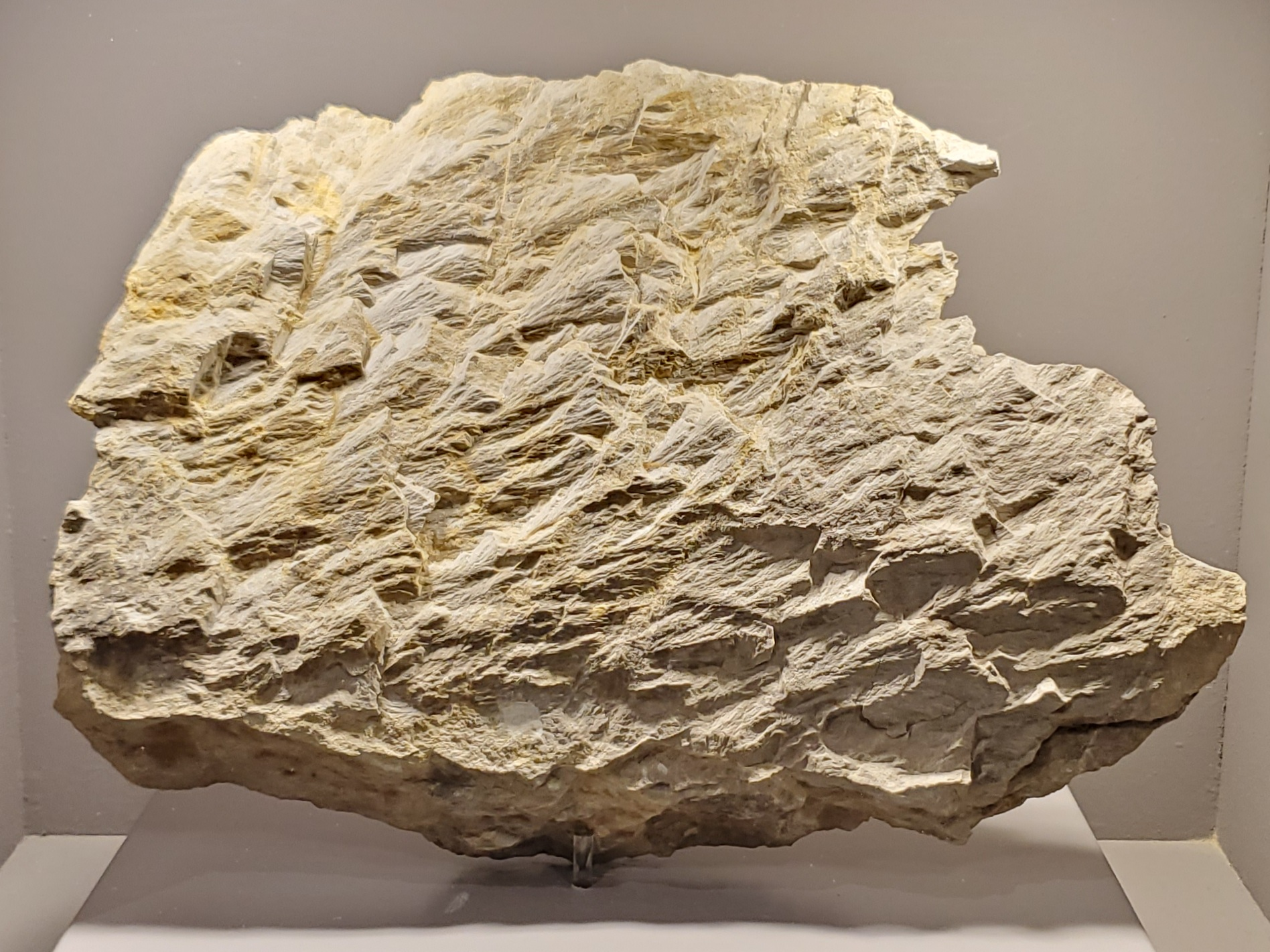
Shatter cones developed in fine grained dolomite from the Wells Creek crater
