= List of fossiliferous stratigraphic units in Tennessee =

This article contains a list of fossil-bearing stratigraphic units in the state of Tennessee, U.S.

== Sites ==
Group or Formation	Period	Notes
Arnheim Formation	Ordovician	
Fernvale Formation	Ordovician	
Benbolt Formation	Ordovician	
Benbolt Formation	Ordovician	
Bigby Formation	Ordovician	
Birdsong Shale	Devonian	
Blackford Formation	Ordovician	
Borden Formation	Carboniferous	
Brownsport Group	Silurian	
Carters Limestone	Ordovician	
Catheys Formation	Ordovician	
Chattanooga Shale	Devonian	
Chepultepec Formation	Ordovician	
Clairborne Formation	Paleogene	
Coffee Sand	Cretaceous	
Coon Creek Formation	Cretaceous	
Cotter Formation	Ordovician	
Decatur Limestone	Silurian	
Demopolis Formation	Cretaceous	
Douglas Lake Member	Ordovician	
Fernvale Limestone	Ordovician	
Fort Payne Chert	Carboniferous	
Grainger Formation	Carboniferous	
Hendersonville Shale	Ordovician	
Hermitage Formation	Ordovician	
Holston Formation	Ordovician	
Inman Formation	Ordovician	
Jackson Formation	Paleogene	
Lebanon Limestone	Ordovician	
Leipers Formation	Ordovician	
Lenoir Formation	Ordovician	
Linden Formation	Devonian	
Longview Formation	Ordovician	
Lorraine Group/Reedsville Formation	Ordovician	
Mannie Formation	Ordovician	
Maryville Limestone	Cambrian	
Midway Group/Clayton Formation	Paleogene	
Porters Creek Formation	Paleogene	
Moccasin Formation	Ordovician	
Murfreesboro Limestone	Ordovician	
Newman Formation	Carboniferous	
Nolichucky Formation	Cambrian	
Ohio Shale	Devonian	
Owl Creek Formation	Cretaceous	
Pewee Coal	Carboniferous	
Pierce Limestone	Ordovician	
Powell Formation	Ordovician	
Richmond Formation	Ordovician	
Ridley Limestone	Ordovician	
Ripley Formation	Cretaceous	
Rockdell Formation	Ordovician	
Rome Formation	Cambrian	
Ross Formation	Devonian	
Sequatchie Formation	Ordovician	
Stones River Group/Carters Limestone	Ordovician	
Warsaw Limestone	Carboniferous	
Wayne Formation	Silurian	
Whitesburg Formation	Ordovician	
Wilcox Formation	Paleogene	

== See also ==
- Paleontology in Tennessee
