= Coffee Sand =

Geologic formation in Tennessee, US

- Stratigraphic range: Campanian
- Type: Formation

Location
- Region: Tennessee
- Country: United States

The Coffee Sand is a geologic formation in Tennessee. It preserves fossils dating back to the Cretaceous period. It preserved indeterminate hadrosauroids including a possible adult Eotrachodon.

== See also ==
- List of fossiliferous stratigraphic units in Tennessee
- Paleontology in Tennessee
