= Brownsport Group =

American fossil group

- Stratigraphic range: Silurian
- Type: Group

Location
- Region: Tennessee
- Country: United States

The Brownsport Group is a geologic group in Tennessee. It preserves fossils dating back to the Silurian period.

== See also ==
- List of fossiliferous stratigraphic units in Tennessee
- Paleontology in Tennessee
