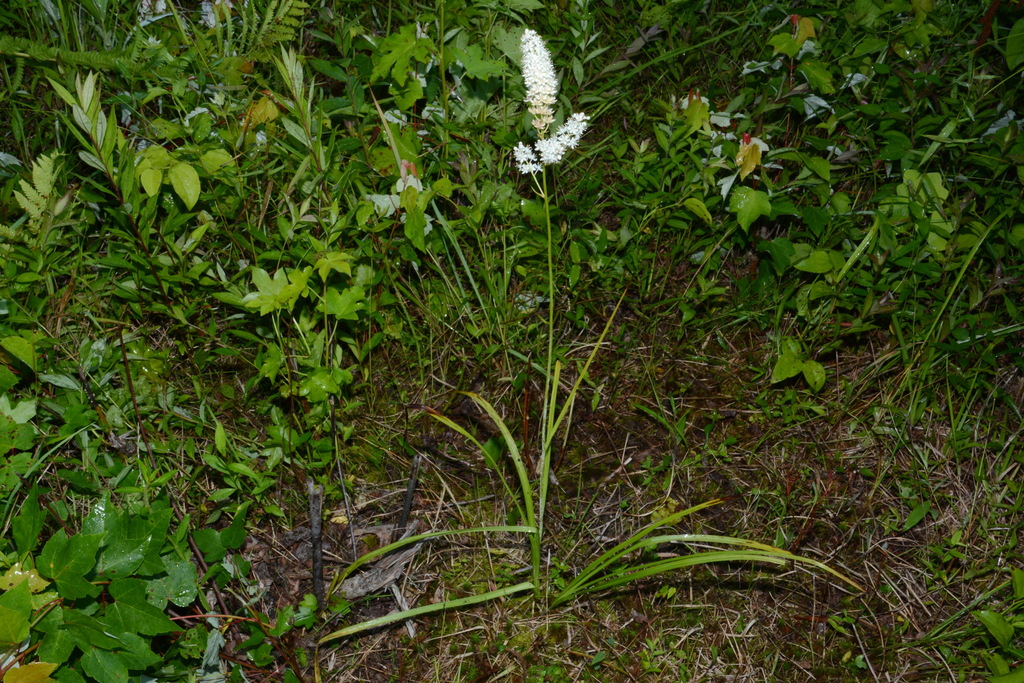
- Stenanthium tennesseense
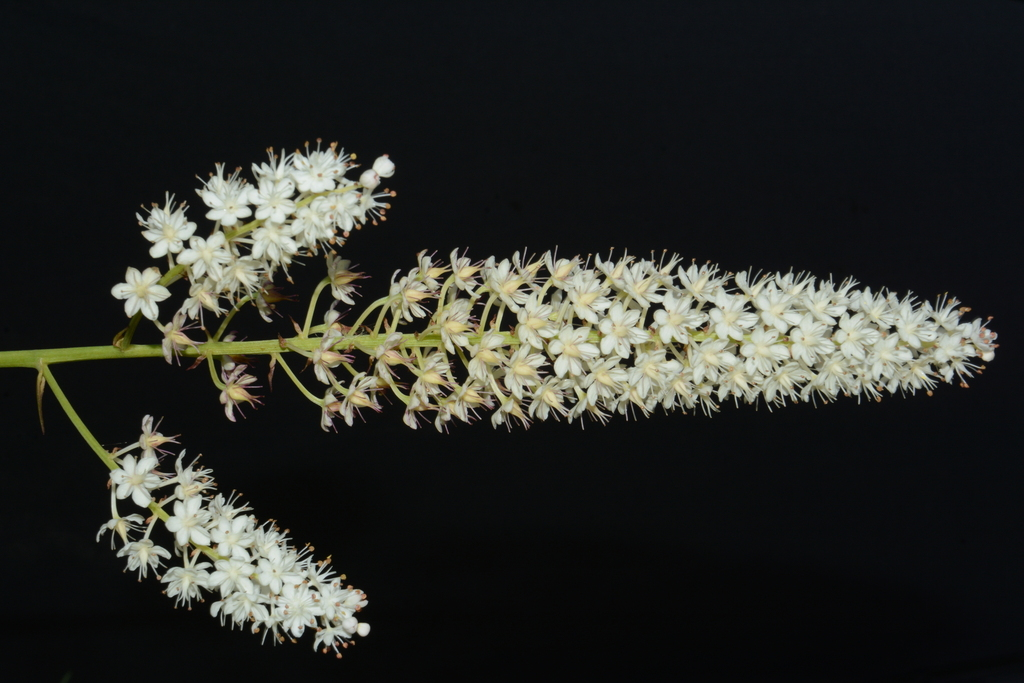
- Inflorescence of Stenanthium tennesseense

Conservation status
- Imperiled (NatureServe)

Scientific classification
- Kingdom: Plantae
- Clade: Tracheophytes
- Clade: Angiosperms
- Clade: Monocots
- Order: Liliales
- Family: Melanthiaceae
- Genus: Stenanthium
- Species: S. tennesseense

Binomial name
- Stenanthium tennesseense Sorrie & Weakley

= Stenanthium tennesseense =

Species of wildflower

Stenanthium tennesseense, also known as the Tennessee death-camas, is a poisonous perennial monocot endemic to wet meadows of the Cumberland Plateau and Highland Rim of Tennessee and potentially North Carolina.
