= Grainger Formation =

Geologic formation in the United States

- Stratigraphic range: Early Mississippian
- Type: Formation

Location
- Region: Tennessee, Kentucky, Virginia
- Country: United States

The Grainger Formation is a geologic formation in Tennessee, Kentucky, and Virginia. It preserves fossils dating back to the early Mississippian subperiod of the Carboniferous period.

== See also ==
- List of fossiliferous stratigraphic units in Tennessee
- List of fossiliferous stratigraphic units in Kentucky
- List of fossiliferous stratigraphic units in Virginia
- Paleontology in Tennessee
- Paleontology in Kentucky
- Paleontology in Virginia
