= Wells Creek Dolomite =

Geological formation in the United States

Wells Creek Formation
- Stratigraphic range: Middle Ordovician
- Type: Formation
- Underlies: Black River Group, Stones River Group
- Overlies: Knox Supergroup
- Thickness: 5' to 180' at surface; 400' to 1,500' subsurface

Lithology
- Primary: Limestone, Dolomite (rock)
- Other: Shale

Location
- Region: Kentucky; Ohio; Pennsylvania; West Virginia
- Country: United States

Type section
- Named for: Wells Creek Basin, in Tennessee

The Wells Creek Dolomite is a geologic formation in with exposures in Kentucky, Tennessee and West Virginia. It dates back to the Ordovician period. This formation rests unconformably over the Knox Supergroup to the south and the St. Peter Sandstone to the north.

== Correlations ==
The Wells Creek correlates with several different formations in adjoining states. In Indiana it is roughly equivalent to the Dutchtown Formation. In Michigan it correlates to the Glenwood Shale. While the Wells Creek is present in far western Pennsylvania it is equivalent to the Shadow Lake Formation further ease in Pennsylvania as well as in Ontario. The Tribes Hill Formation of New York is also equivalent to the Wells Creek.

== Stratigraphy ==
The Wills Creek lies below the Black River Group to the north and Stones River Group or High Bridge Group to the south and west. It lies unconformably over the Knox Supergroup.

The upper section of the Wills Creek is a Cherty limestone or dolomite. Thin shale and siltstone beds maybe found throughout. At the base when contact is made with the Knox, there is a breccia rubble zone. Overall the limestone in the formation is limestone is medium to dark gray and very fine to medium grained. The dolomite is light to medium dark gray, fine to medium crystalline. Where the erosional unconformity of the Knox Unconformity produced fine grained rock fragments that were incorporated into the Wills Creek above.
