= Nolichucky Formation =

Geologic formation in the United States

- Stratigraphic range: Cambrian
- Type: Formation

Lithology
- Primary: Shale

Location
- Region: Virginia, Tennessee
- Country: United States

The Nolichucky Formation is a geologic formation in Virginia and Tennessee. It preserves fossils dating back to the Cambrian period.

== See also ==
- List of fossiliferous stratigraphic units in Virginia
- List of fossiliferous stratigraphic units in Tennessee
- Paleontology in Virginia
- Paleontology in Tennessee
