= Whitesburg Formation =

Geologic formation in Tennessee and Virginia, United States

- Stratigraphic range: Ordovician
- Type: Formation
- Sub-units: Fetzer member

Lithology
- Primary: limestone
- Other: shale

Location
- Region: Tennessee, Virginia
- Country: United States

Type section
- Named for: Whitesburg, Tennessee
- Named by: E.O. Ulrich

The Whitesburg Formation is a dark limestone with interbedded shales geologic formation in Tennessee and Virginia. It preserves fossils dating back to the Ordovician period.

== History ==
The Whitesburg Formation was formally proposed in 1930, though E.O. Ulrich had used the name prior to the formal proposal. The Whitesburg formation was later downgraded to the Whitesburg limestone, and was considered a basal member of the Blockhouse Shale. The Whitesburg Formation was then elevated back to formation status with the Fetzer member assigned as the basal member. The Fetzer is not considered to be a continuous body of rock, and exists in the Whitesburg formation as lenses.

== See also ==
- List of fossiliferous stratigraphic units in Tennessee
- List of fossiliferous stratigraphic units in Virginia
- Paleontology in Tennessee
- Paleontology in Virginia
