= Rockdell Formation =

Geologic formation in Tennessee, United States

- Stratigraphic range: Ordovician
- Type: Formation

Location
- Region: Tennessee
- Country: United States

The Rockdell Formation is a geologic formation in Tennessee. It preserves fossils dating back to the Ordovician period.

== See also ==
- List of fossiliferous stratigraphic units in Tennessee
- Paleontology in Tennessee
