= Stones River Group =

Geologic group in Tennessee, USA

- Stratigraphic range: Ordovician
- Type: Group
- Underlies: Hermitage Formation and Nashville Group
- Overlies: Knox Dolomite

Location
- Region: Alabama, Mississippi, and Tennessee
- Country: United States

The Stones River Group is a geologic group in Tennessee. It preserves fossils dating back to the Ordovician period.

== See also ==
- List of fossiliferous stratigraphic units in Tennessee
- Paleontology in Tennessee
