= Lorraine Group =

Geologic group in the United States and Canada

- Stratigraphic range: Ordovician
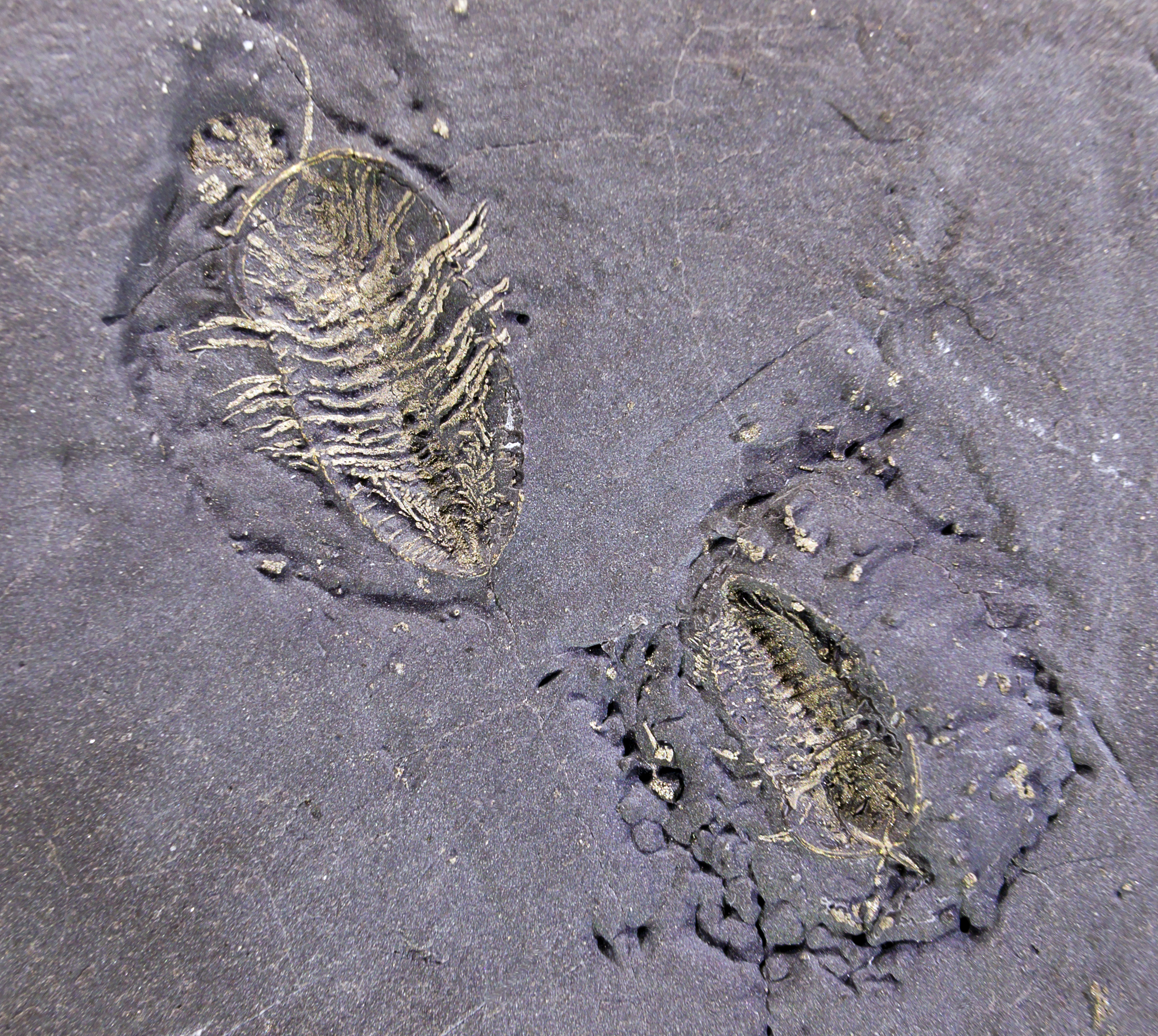
- Pyritized trilobita in Frankfort Shale, Lorraine Group
- Type: Group
- Sub-units: Utica Shale, Frankfort Shale, and the Whetstone Gulf Formation
- Overlies: Trenton Group

Location
- Region: Tennessee, Kentucky, Indiana, Ohio, New York, Ontario, Quebec
- Country: Canada and United States

The Lorraine Group is a geologic group in the northeastern United States and southeastern Canada.

It preserves fossils dating back to the Ordovician Period.

The group is host to pyritized trilobites and other fossils in New York including the Beecher's Trilobite Bed.

== See also ==
- List of fossiliferous stratigraphic units in Indiana
- List of fossiliferous stratigraphic units in Kentucky
- List of fossiliferous stratigraphic units in New York
- List of fossiliferous stratigraphic units in Ohio
- List of fossiliferous stratigraphic units in Ontario
- List of fossiliferous stratigraphic units in Quebec
- List of fossiliferous stratigraphic units in Tennessee
