= Crow poison =

Crow poison, crowpoison, or crow-poison may refer to either of these two plants:

- Stenanthium densum
- Nothoscordum bivalve
