= Catheys Formation =

Geologic formation in Kentucky and Tennessee, United States

- Stratigraphic range: Middle Ordovician
- Type: Formation
- Unit of: Nashville Group, Chickamauga Supergroup
- Underlies: Inman Formation; Sequatchie Formation
- Overlies: Cannon Limestone
- Thickness: up to 250 ft (76 m)

Lithology
- Primary: Limestone (calcilutite, calcisiltite)
- Other: Shale

Location
- Region: Southeastern Tennessee, northwestern Georgia
- Country: United States
- Extent: Tennessee and Georgia

The Catheys Formation is a Middle Ordovician geologic formation within southeastern Tennessee and northwestern Georgia.

It is the uppermost formation of the Nashville Group, overlying Cannon Limestone and underlying either the Inman or Sequatchie formations depending on locality. The lower part of the formation consists of laminated or thin-bedded calcilutite and calcisiltite interbedded with fine-grained limestone. The middle and upper parts are composed chiefly of irregularly bedded fossiliferous limestone separated by shale partings. The formation contains abundant marine fossils, including brachiopods and bryozoans, indicating deposition in a shallow water marine environment during the Ordovician.

== See also ==
- List of fossiliferous stratigraphic units in Tennessee
- Paleontology in Tennessee
