= Leipers Limestone =

Geologic formation in the southern United States

- Stratigraphic range: Ordovician
- Type: Formation
- Underlies: Chattanooga Shale and Cumberland Formation
- Overlies: Catheys Formation
- Thickness: 35-55 m

Lithology
- Primary: Limestone
- Other: dolomite, shale

Location
- Region: Kentucky, Tennessee, Alabama, Georgia
- Country: United States

The Leipers Limestone is a geologic formation in Kentucky, Tennessee, Alabama and Georgia. It preserves fossils dating back to the Ordovician Period.

== See also ==
- List of fossiliferous stratigraphic units in Kentucky
