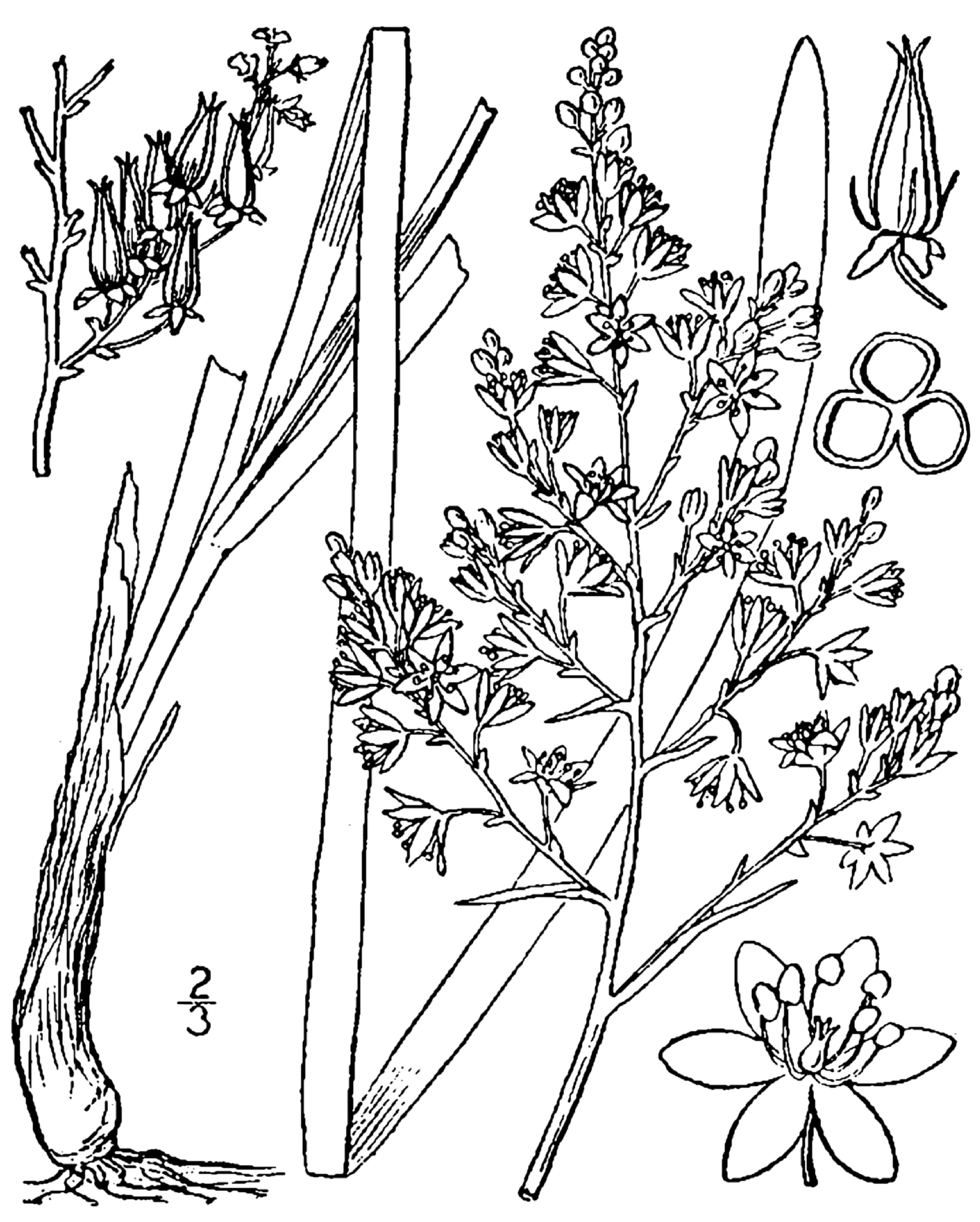
- 1913 illustration

Scientific classification
- Kingdom: Plantae
- Clade: Tracheophytes
- Clade: Angiosperms
- Clade: Monocots
- Order: Liliales
- Family: Melanthiaceae
- Genus: Stenanthium
- Species: S. leimanthoides

Binomial name
- Stenanthium leimanthoides (A.Gray) Zomlefer & Judd

Synonyms
- Amianthium leimanthoides A.Gray; Zigadenus leimanthoides (A.Gray) A.Gray]

= Stenanthium leimanthoides =

Species of plant

Stenanthium leimanthoides is a poisonous monocot wildflower. It is either treated as a separate species to Stenanthium densum or as a synonym of that species. A common name is pine barren deathcamas.

Within the family Melanthiaceae, it is placed in the tribe Melanthieae. Molecular phylogenetic studies in the 21st century have resulted in substantial rearrangement of the species in this tribe, many being moved to different genera. S. leimanthoides was previously placed in Zigadenus as Z. leimanthoides, and will be found under this name in older sources.

It is native to the southernmost United States, more inland than S. densum, largely in the Appalachian Mountains.
