= Cumberland Formation (Kentucky) =

Geologic formation in Kentucky, United States

- Stratigraphic range: Ordovician
- Type: Formation
- Underlies: Chattanooga Shale
- Overlies: Leipers Limestone

Location
- Region: Southeastern United States
- Country: United States
- Extent: Kentucky

The Cumberland Formation is a geologic formation in Kentucky. It dates back to the Ordovician period .
