= Hermitage Formation =

Geologic formation in Tennessee

- Stratigraphic range: Ordovician
- Type: Formation
- Overlies: Stones River Group

Location
- Region: Mississippi and Tennessee
- Country: United States

The Hermitage Formation is a geologic formation in Tennessee. It preserves fossils dating back to the Ordovician period.

== See also ==
- List of fossiliferous stratigraphic units in Tennessee
- Paleontology in Tennessee
