= Land Trust for Tennessee =

American non-profit conservation organization

- Land Trust for Tennessee Inc.
- Formation: 1999; 27 years ago
- Type: Nonprofit
- Tax ID no.: 62-1770549
- Legal status: 501(c)(3)
- Headquarters: Nashville, Tennessee
- Board Chair: Louise Beasley
- President & CEO: Liz McLaurin
- Website: https://www.landtrusttn.org/

The Land Trust for Tennessee is a non-profit conservation organization working to protect Tennessee's natural, scenic, and historic landscapes and sites. Since 1999, The Land Trust has conserved more than 137,000 acres (550 km^{2}) of land across 65-plus Tennessee counties.

The Land Trust for Tennessee is an accredited member of The Land Trust Alliance and a subsequent member of Terrafirma RRG LLC, The Land Trust Alliance's shared conservation defense service.

Liz McLaurin is the president and CEO of The Land Trust for Tennessee. The organization operates statewide with offices based in Nashville and Chattanooga.

== Protected lands ==
The Land Trust for Tennessee protects working farms and forests, recreational and scenic places, historic landscapes, urban land, critical watershed areas and community and cultural resources across the state. The organization has completed more than 420 conservation projects.

=== Working farms and forests ===
The Land Trust for Tennessee is the only statewide organization in Tennessee actively conserving farmland. Since its founding, the organization has worked with private landowners to protect more than 40,000 acres of farmland, including multiple "Century Farms" owned and continuously operated by the same family for more than 100 years.

=== Recreational and scenic lands ===
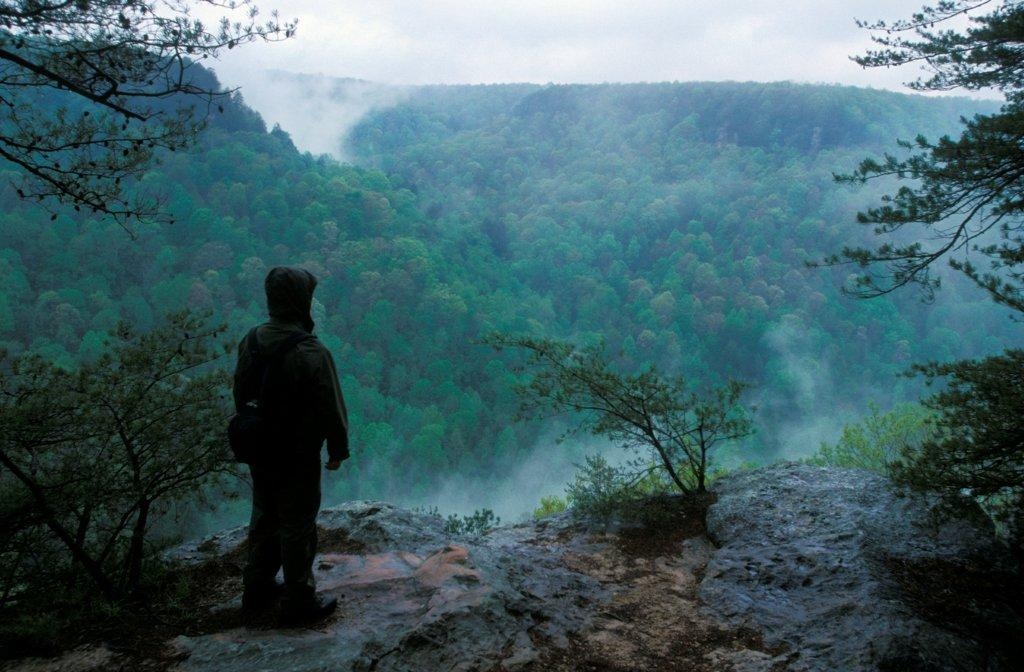
The Fiery Gizzard overlook in Marion County, Tennessee

In some instances, The Land Trust for Tennessee partners with government agencies and non-government organizations to protect land for public use. Project partners include the Tennessee Department of Environment and Conservation, Tennessee Wildlife Resources Agency, the National Park Service.

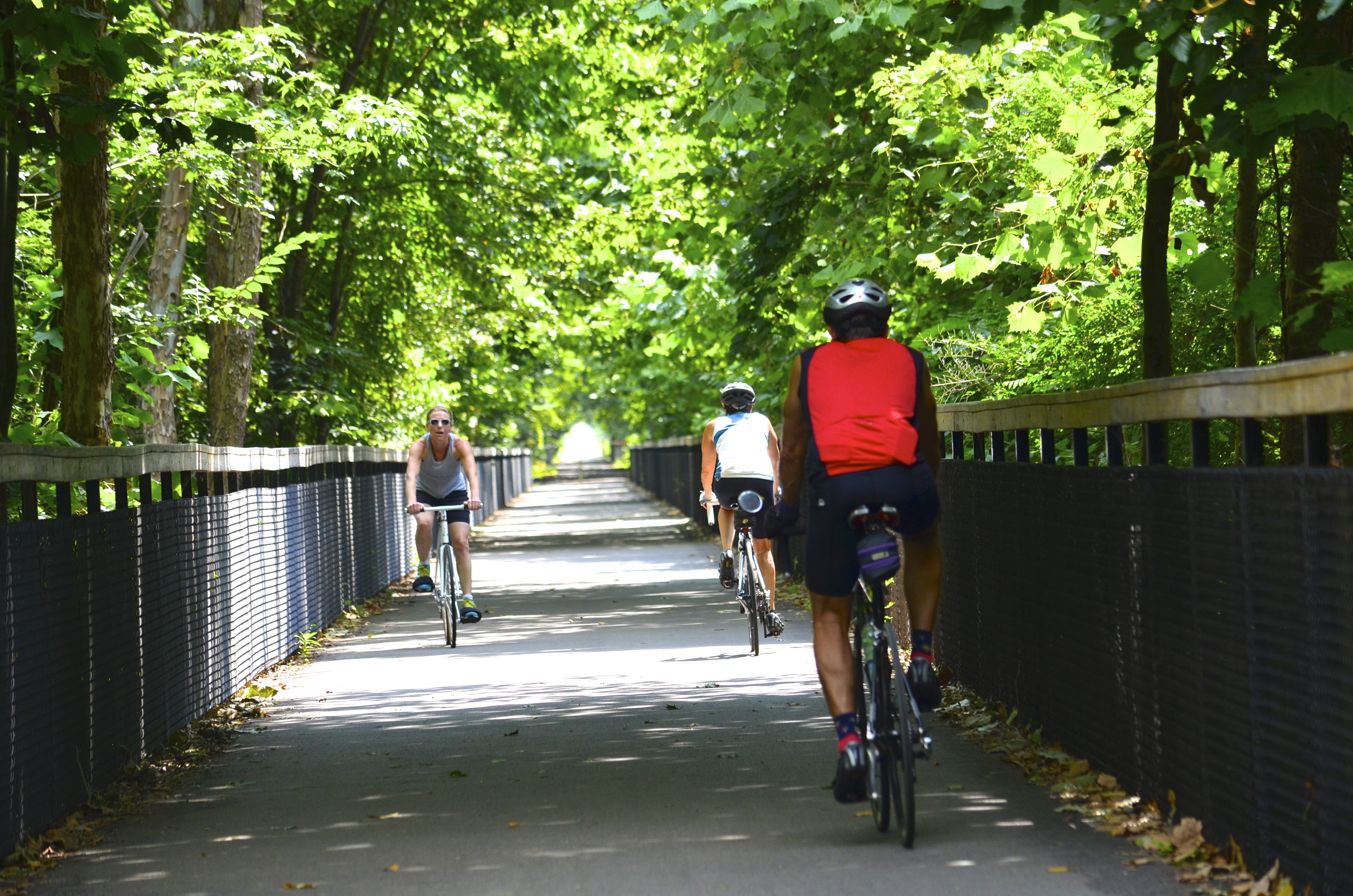
Shelby Farms Park bike trail in Shelby County, Tennessee

On the Cumberland Plateau, The Land Trust has partnered to expand land and public access to South Cumberland State Park, Fiery Gizzard, the Mountain Goat Trail, Fall Creek Falls, Burgess Falls and (in cooperation with Sewanee, The University of the South) Lost Cove and Shakerag Hollow. The Land Trust is the state of Tennessee's partner for the Justin P. Wilson Cumberland Trail State Park, a long-distance footpath extending 282 miles from the Cumberland Gap National Historic Park to Signal Point in the Chickamauga-Chattanooga National Military Park.

The Land Trust holds conservation easements on public parkland to ensure parks retain their use for parks and public recreation, including: Shelby Farms Park in Memphis, Tennessee; Nashville's old growth Hill Forest addition to the Warner Parks; Bowie Nature Park in Fairview, and Harlinsdale Farm Park in Franklin and Lakeshore Park in Knoxville, Tennessee.

With Tennessee Department of Environment and Conservation and the Friends of Radnor Lake, The Land Trust partnered to expand the boundary of Radnor Lake State Natural Area, Nashville's 1,268-acre urban wilderness.

The Land Trust protects over 4,000 acres in more than two dozen projects along the Tennessee corridor of the Natchez Trace Parkway, as well as scenic river corridors including the Hiwassee River in East Tennessee, the Duck and Harpeth Rivers in Middle Tennessee, and the Hatchie River in West Tennessee.

=== Historic properties ===
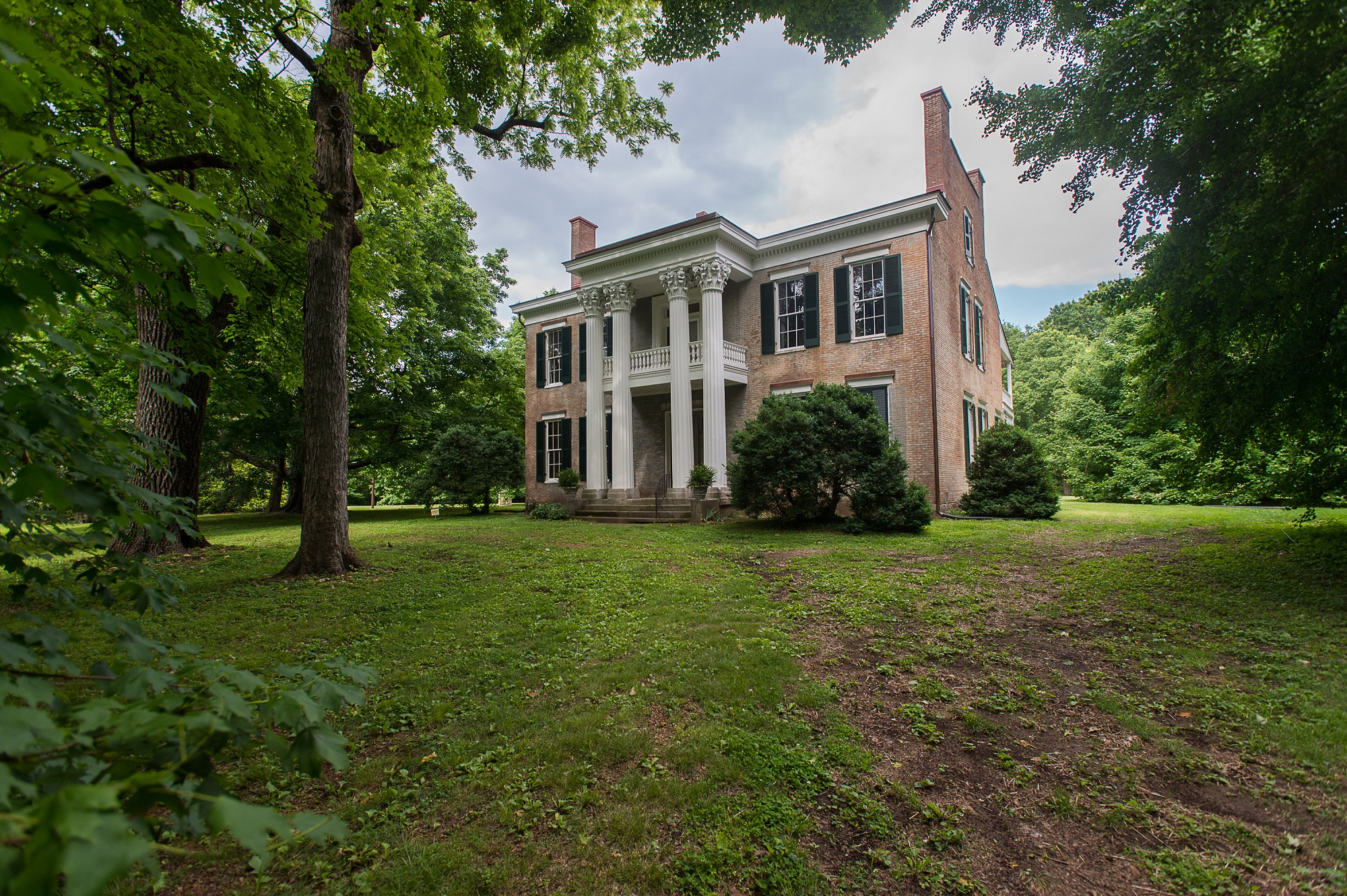
Historic Glen Leven Home in Davidson County, six miles from downtown Nashville, Tennessee

In 2010, protection of historic properties earned The Land Trust for Tennessee an honor award from the National Trust for Historic Preservation. The Land Trust protects multiple properties on the National Register of Historic Places, Tennessee Century Farms, sites with critical American Indian history, and significant Civil War properties, including sites in Franklin, Nashville, Thompson's Station and New Johnsonville and Rippavilla Plantation in Spring Hill. The Land Trust works to preserve the community character of Tennessee towns through projects such as the protection of the scenic gateways in the Leiper's Fork community of Williamson County.

=== Urban open space ===
In 2011, The Land Trust for Tennessee partnered with The Office of the Mayor and The Conservation Fund to spearhead Nashville: Naturally, a plan that catalogues protected open space in Davidson County and charts the course for how to protect and connect this green infrastructure. Key land protection resulting from the plan includes: the acquisition of the former Cornelia Fort Airpark for the Shelby Bottoms Greenway and Nature Park in East Nashville; a 568-acre expansion of Beaman Park; and the 780-acre property acquisition along the Stones River in 2012.

=== Wildlife habitat ===
The Land Trust for Tennessee has completed multiple conservation projects focused on protecting wildlife habitat within farms, forests, parks, riparian corridors and wetlands. The Land Trust provides resources and educates owners of Land Trust-protected land about best practices to restore, maintain and enhance wildlife habitat.

In 2008, The Land Trust partnered with The University of the South to protect 3,000 acres of land containing portions of Lost and Champion Coves to protect wildlife habitat. This project links together large, protected tracts, including Franklin State Forest, two State Natural Areas, Buggy Top Cave and Natural Bridge, creating and conserving large-scale wildlife corridors.

In 2012, The Land Trust partnered with Tennessee Wildlife Resources Agency to protect migratory land for 48,000 Sandhill Cranes on a significant point on The Trail of Tears along Blythe Ferry Road in Meigs County, Tennessee.

In 2016, The Land Trust for Tennessee and its partners, including The Conservation Fund, protected 4,061 acres of forest in Sherwood, located in Franklin and Marion counties, that includes habitat for the federally threatened painted snake coiled forest snails and other state-listed species.

=== Watershed protection ===
The Land Trust conserves lands that border rivers, lakes and streams to create natural buffers that filter pollution to protect both groundwater and surface water quality for human and wildlife health. The Land Trust protects more than 10,000 acres within the Duck River Watershed, one of the most biologically diverse inland freshwater ecosystem in North America, and land within other focal watersheds, including the Harpeth, Red, Buffalo, Watauga and Hiwassee Rivers and Oostanaula Creek.

== Strategies for land protection ==
The majority of The Land Trust for Tennessee's conservation projects are completed by donated conservation easements. Through these legal agreements, private or public landowners continue to own their property, and limitations are placed on future development to protect conservation values.

In some cases, The Land Trust for Tennessee works to acquire potential parkland and wildlife habitat to transfer to government entities. The Land Trust often assists in securing private dollars and works with other conservation partners to supplement state and federal resources. In other cases, The Land Trust for Tennessee also protects land through purchased conservation easements, land donations, bargain sale arrangements, and land purchases.

== Glen Leven Farm ==
The Land Trust owns and maintains Glen Leven Farm, a 64-acre working farm just four miles from the center of Nashville that includes a Greek Revival home built in 1857. In late 2006, the historic home and farm were left to The Land Trust by the late Susan M. West, a descendant of Thomas Thompson who acquired 647 acres through a Revolutionary Land Grant in 1790.

In 2012, the arboretum at Glen Leven Farm was established through the Nashville Tree Foundation and includes the largest mass of American Yellowwood in the United States, a White Ash, a Basswood, an American Ash, a Dogwood, a Ginkgo, a Black Walnut, a Sugar Maple, a Chinkapin Oak, a Laurel Oak, a Pecan, a Hedge Maple and a massive Trifoliate Orange tree – all winners of the Nashville Tree Foundation's Big Old Tree Contest.

Glen Leven Farm also hosts educational programs such as The Land Trust's Field Study Program for school groups. The program meets state curriculum standards and exposes students to a natural, historic and agricultural landscape, providing an enriched learning experience outside of the classroom.

The organization hosts group tours and community days at Glen Leven Farm, but the property is not to regularly open to the public.

== History and foundation ==
=== Formation and first projects ===
The Land Trust for Tennessee was co-founded in 1999 by Jean C. Nelson (former general counsel to the Environmental Protection Agency), Phil Bredesen (Mayor of Nashville-Davidson County 1991–1999; Governor of Tennessee 2003–2011), and a group of 12 founding individuals.

The Land Trust for Tennessee's first project was a conservation easement donated by Aubrey Preston in December 1999 on his farm in Leiper's Fork in Williamson County, one of the 50 fastest growing U.S. counties.

=== 2010–Present ===
In 2010, The Land Trust for Tennessee became the first land trust operating in the state to earn accreditation by The Land Trust Alliance Accreditation Commission.

Founding President and CEO Jean C. Nelson announced her retirement in July 2015 as part of a planned transition. Liz McLaurin was named President of The Land Trust in July 2015 and was announced as CEO in May 2016.
