= Fort Payne Formation =

Carboniferous period geologic formation in Appalachia and Southeastern United States

Fort Payne Chert
- Stratigraphic range: Viséan
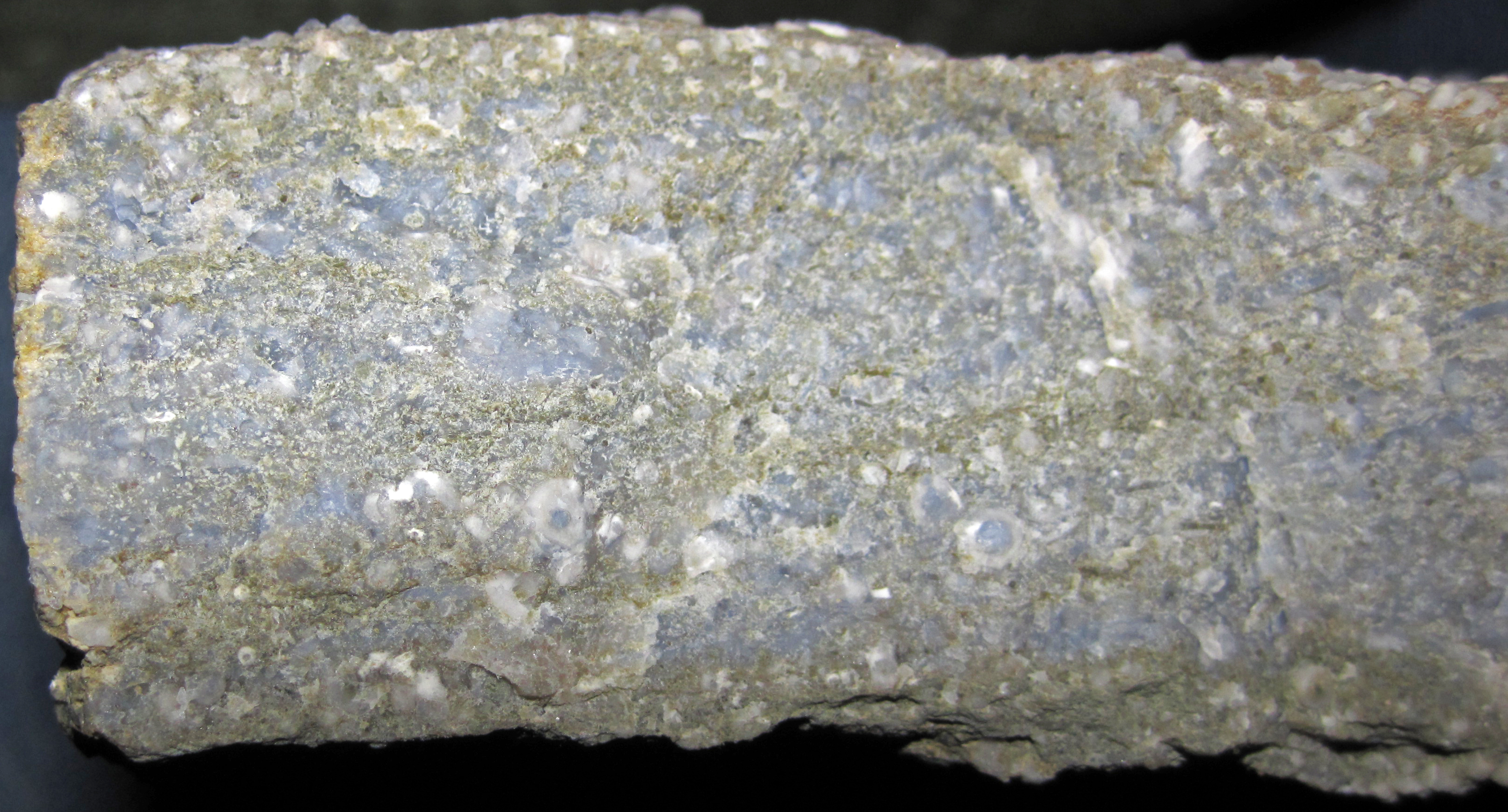
- Chertified fossiliferous limestone from the Fort Payne Formation (Kentucky)
- Type: Formation
- Underlies: Tuscumbia Limestone and Ullin Formation
- Overlies: Maccrady Formation and Springville Formation

Lithology
- Primary: limestone

Location
- Region: Appalachia and Southeastern United States
- Country: United States
- Extent: Illinois, Kentucky, Mississippi, Missouri, Tennessee, and Virginia

The Fort Payne Formation, or Fort Payne Chert, is a geologic formation found in the southeastern region of the United States. It is a Mississippian Period cherty limestone, that overlies the Chattanooga Shale (or locally the Maury Formation), and underlies the St. Louis Limestone (lower Tuscumbia Limestone in Alabama). To the north, it grades into the siltstone Borden Formation. It preserves fossils dating back to the Carboniferous period.

Eugene Allen Smith named the Fort Payne Formation for outcrops at Fort Payne, Alabama.

== See also ==
- Carboniferous United States
- Carboniferous stratigraphic units of North America
- Mississippian (geologic period)
- List of fossiliferous stratigraphic units in Kentucky
