= Chattanooga Shale =

Geologic formation in Appalachian and Southern United States

- Stratigraphic range: Devonian
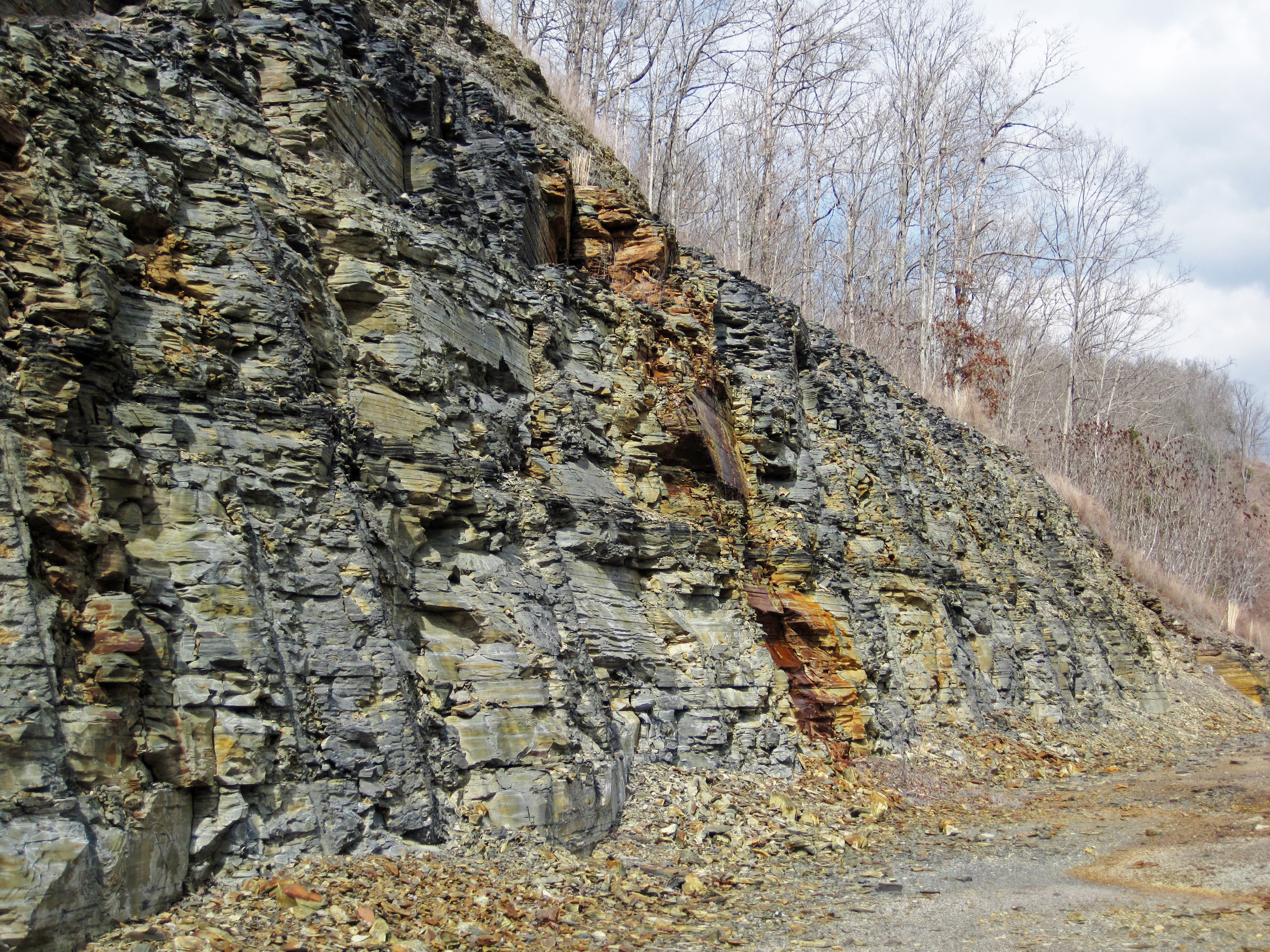
- Chattanooga Shale in Kentucky
- Type: Formation
- Underlies: Maury Shale, Boone Formation
- Overlies: Unconformity on Ordovician Cumberland Formation Leipers Limestone and other units

Lithology
- Primary: Shale
- Other: Sandstone

Location
- Region: Arkansas, Kansas, Kentucky, Tennessee, Alabama, Georgia, Missouri, Mississippi
- Country: United States

Type section
- Named by: Charles Willard Hayes

The Chattanooga Shale is a geological formation in Alabama, Arkansas, Georgia, Kansas, Kentucky, Missouri and Tennessee. It preserves conodont fossils dating to the Devonian period. It occurs mostly as a subsurface geologic formation composed of layers of shale. It is located in East Tennessee and also extends into southeastern Kentucky, northwestern Georgia, and northern Alabama. This part of Alabama is part of the Black Warrior Basin.

The Chattanooga Shale of East Tennessee is reported to be an extension of or correlates with the Marcellus Shale of the Appalachian region to the east. Exploratory drilling of the Chattanooga Shale in East Tennessee indicates that it contains significant amounts of natural gas. This has resulted in interest in and attempts to use hydraulic fracturing to exploit the resource.

This is a particularly interesting structure, both in terms of what it represents for the region's petroleum infrastructure, and in terms of what it represented for the ancient landscapes in which it embedded.

== Geological and stratigraphic overview ==
Chattanooga Shale belongs to the Upper Devonian (and perhaps Lower Mississippian), running from the Famennian Stage of the Devonian to the Kinderhookian Stage of the Mississippian. It is usually interpreted as dark fibrous shale made from finely fragmented silt and clay sand blown onto ancient sea beds. Shale is dark - high in organic matter - and will weather into little flat flakes, as it has small particles and layers.

The Chattanooga Shale is a member of the Devonian Shale-Middle and Upper Paleozoic Total Petroleum System (TPS) stretching from New York to Tennessee that comprises six large petroleum systems. Such systems span Cambrian to Pennsylvanian intervals, and the Chattanooga Shale feeds much of the Appalachian Basin's oil and gas.

Arkansas's is mostly Devonian, and the Chattanooga Shale in northeastern Oklahoma and western Kansas has perhaps a few Mississippian-age boulders at the top. Stratigraphically, the Chattanooga Shale tends to lie below the Fort Payne Chert and overlaid by limestones of various thickness and density.

=== Members and lithology ===
There are several informal members to the Chattanooga Shale ᅳ Misener Sandstone Member and lower, middle, and upper shale members. The Misener Sandstone Member in Appalachia is the formation's source. This phosphatic quartz sandstone is called the Sylamore Sandstone and is present in the Chattanooga interval also in eastern Oklahoma and northern Arkansas. These are supported by shale units, all different in composition and thickness at different locations.

Within the Chattanooga Shale, especially central Kansas, there is a limestone matrix up to 12 meters thick engrained in the upper shale. A limestone directly beneath the Mississippian carbonate boundary has been a leading factor used to help identify surface exposures in the region. While there are not many fossils left in the shale – conodonts, brachiopods and uncommon microfossils of land plants, the fossils have played a major role in identifying dates and depositional conditions in the formation.

=== Organic richness and petroleum potential ===
The Chattanooga Shale is famous for its organic depth, as it is one of the largest sources of petroleum. The middle shale fraction has a high TOC level, as a result it is one of the most significant geologic units in the Appalachian Basin petroleum chains. Geochemical analyses of the shale show that the TOC level varies dramatically, and the middle part of the shale has typically the highest organics. This difference suggests that the shale has been a part of many different settings and conditions as some areas of the rock have endured more robust biotic accumulation.

The Chattanooga Shale's role in the middle and upper Paleozoic Total Petroleum System has gained a lot of studies, including natural gas studies. It acts as a reservoir for a massive number of hydrocarbons, and a good supply of that gas comes from the rocks, particularly in Kentucky, Tennessee, and West Virginia. The Chattanooga Shale's oil reserves were appraised by USGS, which took notes on large amounts of technically recoverable gas, oil, and NGLs in most appraisals over the years (including 2006, 2008, and 2019).

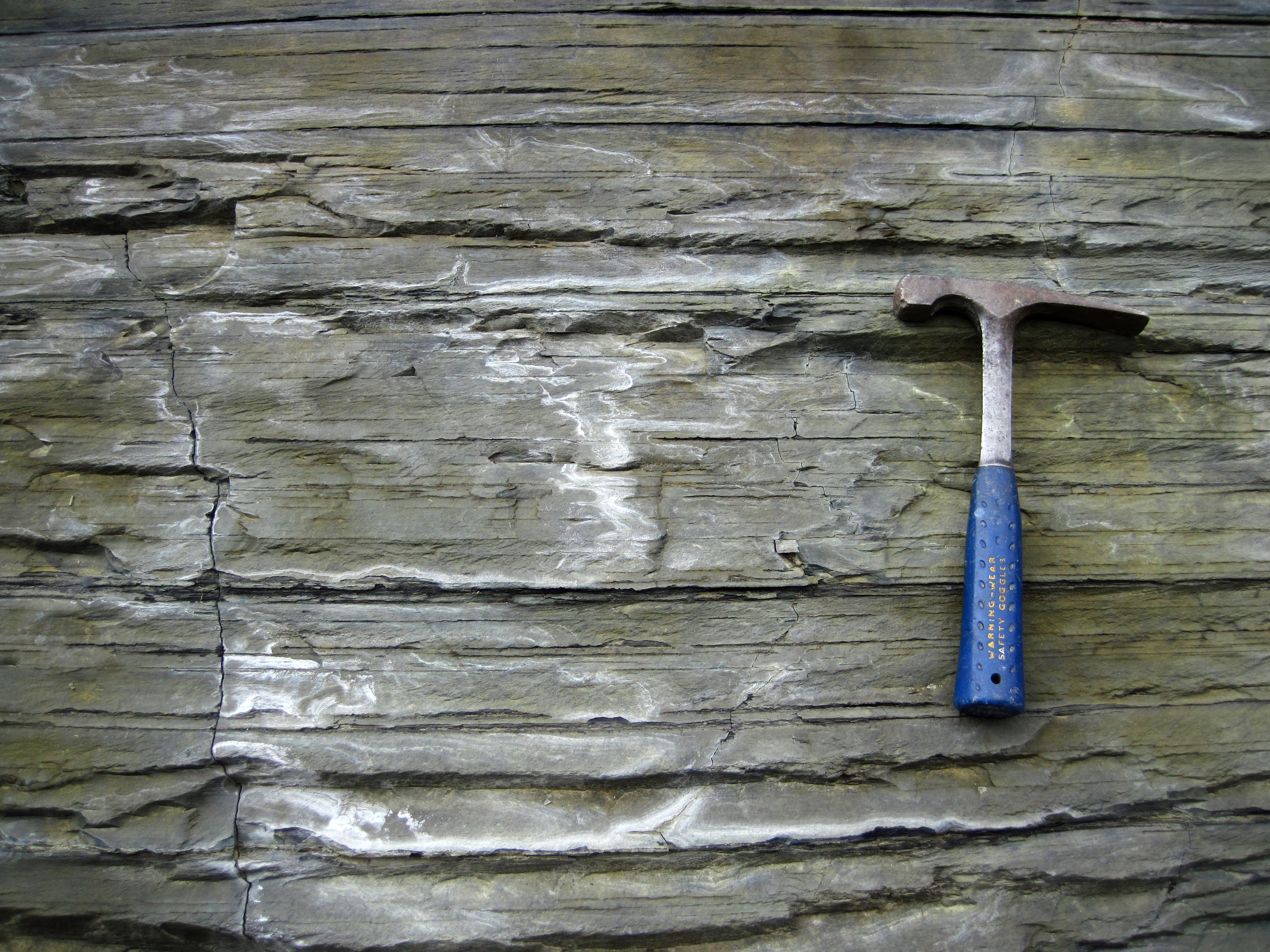
Chattanooga Shale in Kentucky

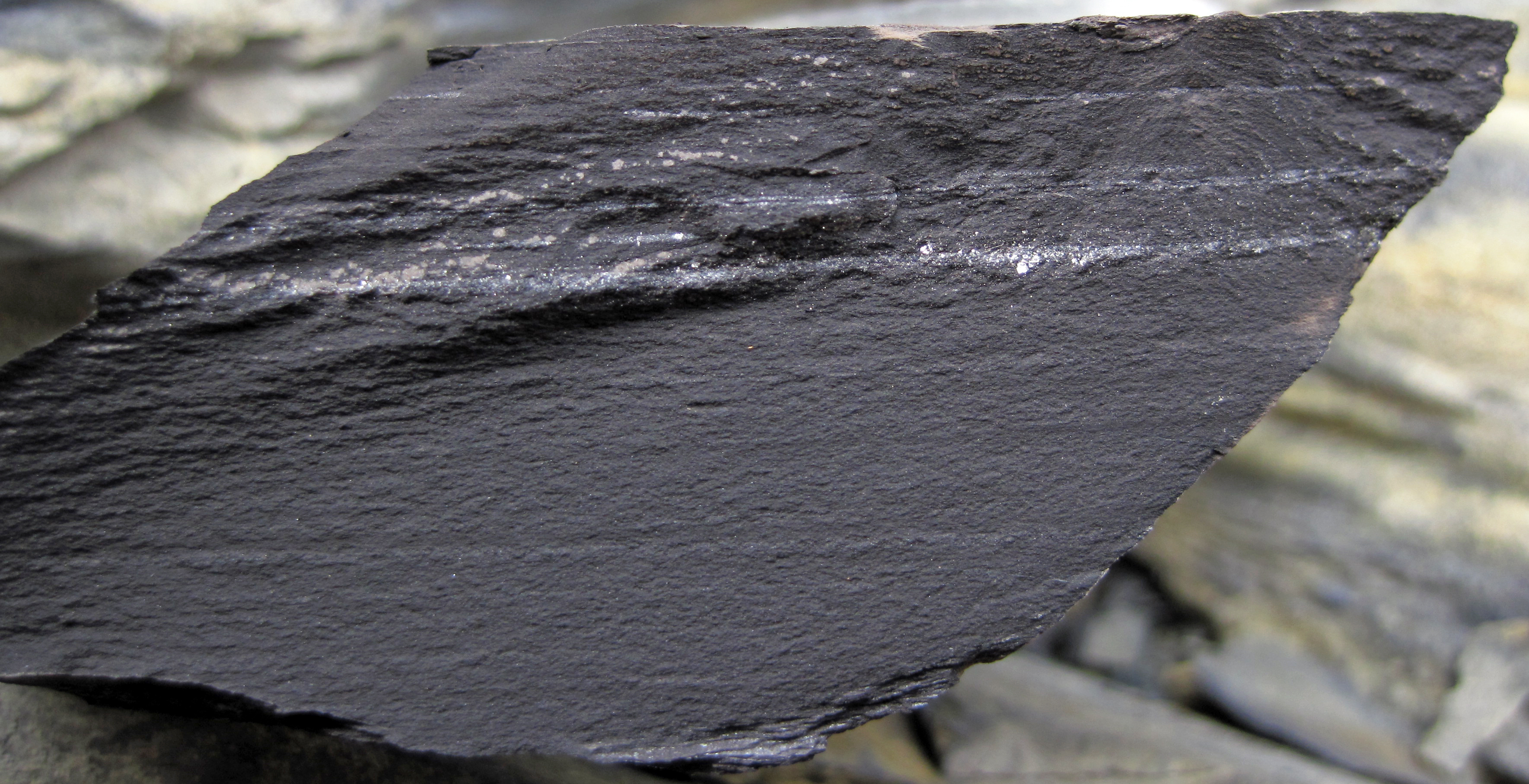
Chattanooga Shale

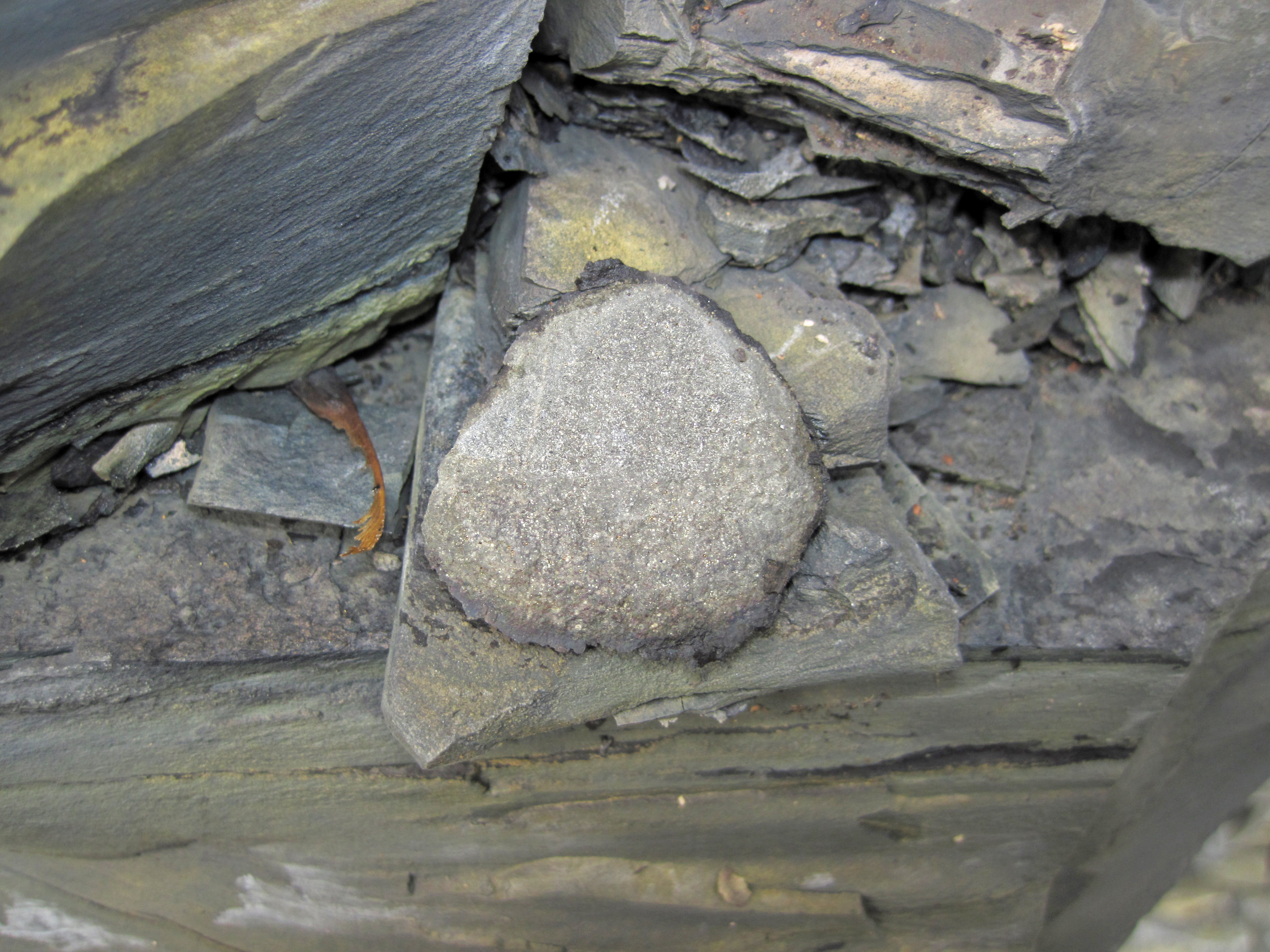
Pyrite concretion in Chattanooga Shale

== See also ==
- List of fossiliferous stratigraphic units in Alabama
- List of fossiliferous stratigraphic units in Arkansas
- List of fossiliferous stratigraphic units in Georgia (U.S. state)
- List of fossiliferous stratigraphic units in Kansas
- List of fossiliferous stratigraphic units in Kentucky
- List of fossiliferous stratigraphic units in Missouri
- List of fossiliferous stratigraphic units in Tennessee
