= Paleontology in Tennessee =

Paleontological research in the U.S. state of Tennessee

The location of the state of Tennessee

Paleontology in Tennessee refers to paleontological research occurring within or conducted by people from the U.S. state of Tennessee. During the early part of the Paleozoic era, Tennessee was covered by a warm, shallow sea. This sea was home to brachiopods, bryozoans, cephalopods, corals, and trilobites. Tennessee is one of the best sources of Early Devonian fossils in North America. During the mid-to-late Carboniferous, the state became a swampy environment, home to a rich variety of plants including ferns and scale trees. A gap in the local rock record spans from the Permian through the Jurassic. During the Cretaceous, the western part of the state was submerged by seawater. The local waters were home to more fossil gastropods than are known from anywhere else in the world. Mosasaurs and sea turtles also inhabited these waters. On land the state was home to dinosaurs. Western Tennessee was still under the sea during the early part of the Cenozoic. Terrestrial portions of the state were swampy. Climate cooled until the Ice Age, when the state was home to Camelops, horses, mammoths, mastodons, and giant ground sloths. The local Yuchi people told myths of giant lizard monsters that may have been inspired by fossils either local or encountered elsewhere. In 1920, after local fossils became a subject of formal scientific study, a significant discovery of a variety of Pleistocene creatures was made near Nashville. The Cretaceous bivalve Pterotrigonia thoracica is the Tennessee state fossil.

== Prehistory ==
=== Paleozoic ===
During the Precambrian, Tennessee was located in the southern hemisphere and covered by seawater. During the early part of the Paleozoic, Tennessee was located at the southern edge of North America, but still covered in seawater. Tennessee was covered by shallow seas during the Ordovician. The Ordovician carbonate rocks deposited in that environment are now "world-class" sources of fossils. Ordovician algae were preserved in Rutherford and Smith Counties. Ordovician brachiopods were preserved in Rutherford and Smith Counties. Ordovician bryozoans were preserved in Rutherford and Smith Counties. Ordovician cephalopods were preserved in Rutherford County. Ordovician coral was preserved in Rutherford and Smith Counties. Ordovician crustaceans were preserved in Smith County. Ordovician cystoids were preserved in Smith County. Ordovician gastropods were preserved in Rutherford County. Ordovician hydrozoans were preserved in Smith County. Ordovician ostracods were preserved in Rutherford County. Ordovician pelecypods were preserved in Smith County. Ordovician sponges were preserved in Rutherford and Smith Counties. Ordovician starfish were preserved in Rutherford County. Stromatoporoids lived in Tennessee during the Ordovician. Ordovician trilobites were preserved in Rutherford County.

Silurian Tennessee remained covered by seawater. The Silurian fauna of Tennessee included brachiopods, bryozoans, crinoids, and gastropods. Tennessee was still submerged into the ensuing Devonian period. During the Early Devonian, brachiopods and gastropods still lived in Tennessee. Decatur and Benton Counties preserve the remains of creatures like brachiopods, which are the most common, many bryozoans, crinoids, two favosites, and two tetracorals. Tennessee is one of the best sources of Early Devonian fossils in North America. One survey documented at least 99 species of Early Devonian invertebrate in the state's Birdsong shale, of these 66 were shared with contemporary deposits in New York. Among Middle Devonian life documented by Tennessee's fossil record, a small variety of brachiopods are most common. Other life included a large variety of corals.

The sea remained in place during the early part of the Carboniferous period. The Mississippian carbonates of Tennessee are very rich in fossils. In the Mississippian Tennessee was home to large fish, abundant conodonts, and plants. Swampy conditions prevailed in Tennessee during the later part of the Mississippian epoch. During the Pennsylvanian epoch Tennessee was home to vast river systems flowing toward the west. These rivers formed huge deltas covered in swamps. The contemporary local swamps were densely vegetated with a flora that included horsetails and scale trees. The rich vegetation growing during this interval of time left behind a great abundance of fossils in what are now the rocks of the Cumberland Plateau. The state's coal deposits also formed from plants of this age. Local sediments were being eroded away rather than deposited during the remainder of the Paleozoic era. As such there are no rocks of that age in which fossils could have been preserved.

=== Mesozoic ===
The early part of the ensuing Mesozoic era is also missing from the local rock record. Sedimentation did not resume in Tennessee until the Cretaceous period. At that time western Tennessee was once more submerged by seawater. 75 million years ago, the area around what is now Coon Creek was just off the coast of a Late Cretaceous sea. Hundreds of different gastropod species were preserved here. The gastropods are more diverse here than at any other fossil site in the world. Other invertebrates included and a brachiopod, thirty species of bryozoans, two genera of corals, five species of crustaceans, 120 species of pelecypod, four species of scaphopod, two genera of starfish, and two genera of worms. Vertebrate life included mosasaurs, sea turtles, and representatives of seven major groups of fish. Foraminiferan fossils are abundant in the Cretaceous deposits of Hardin, McNairy, Henderson, and Chester Counties. The eastern part of the state, was dry land and home to dinosaurs. Among them were duck-billed hadrosaurs.

=== Cenozoic ===
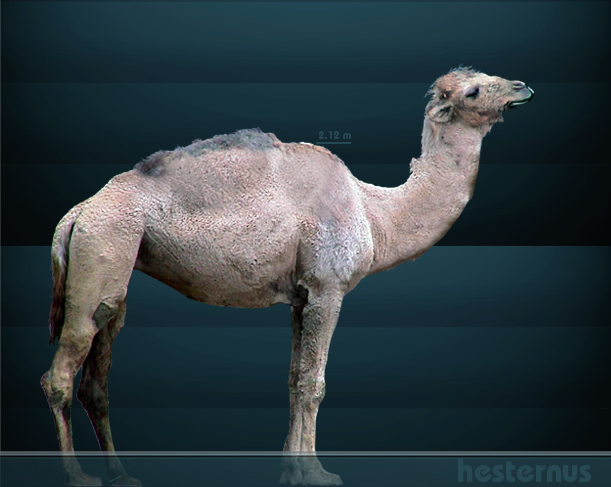
Camelops.

Western Tennessee was also submerged by tropical seawater at times during the ensuing Tertiary period of the Cenozoic era. This sea was home to molluscs. A few foraminiferans from Eocene Tennessee were preserved in the state's fossil record. On land, Rivers also flowed through the state. Tennessee was variously covered in forests and swamps. Early Tertiary plant remains from western Tennessee indicate that at the time the region had a tropical climate similar to that of modern Central or South America. Local wildlife included alligators, Red pandas, elephants, and tapirs. The local climate became significantly colder during the ensuing Quaternary period. Although glaciers were widespread on the continent, they did not extend far enough south to enter Tennessee. Local wildlife included the camel Camelops, deer, the horse Equus complicatus, the horse Equus leidyi, mastodons, the giant ground sloth Mylodon harlani, and turtles. All these left their remains in the floodplain sediments east of the Cumberland River.

== History ==
=== Indigenous interpretations ===
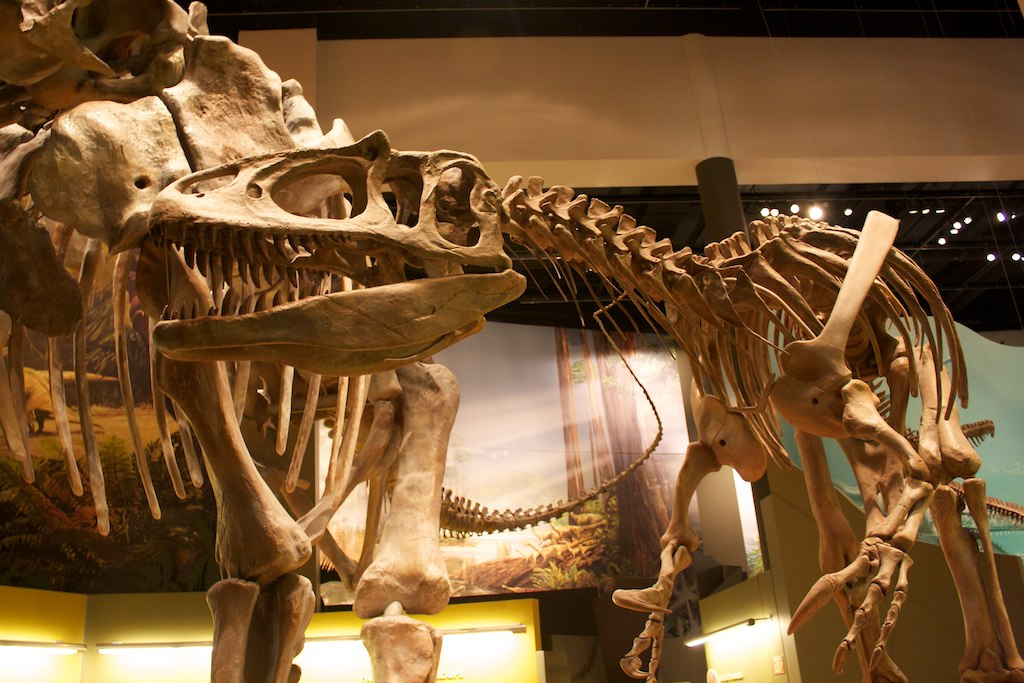
Saurophaganax.

Although the Yuchi people now live in Oklahoma, prior to the 19th century they lived in Tennessee. The Yuchi have an annual ceremony called the Lizard Dance based on an old story about an encounter between some Yuchi people and a giant lizard. The story was set a long time ago, and featured a medicine man who was training up three boys in traditional medicine knowledge in a strange place far from their home village. The medicine man found a large hollow tree. He told the boys to stay away from this tree and told two of them to go get wood. But one disobeyed and tried to cut down the tree. In response to the disturbance, a gigantic lizard emerged from the hole in the tree and dragged the boy inside. That night the medicine man prepared an alluring poisonous concoction and set it out for the lizard. When the lizard ingested the poison it died and the Yuchi decapitated it and returned home with its head. Norman Littlebear is a Yuchi-Shawnee elder who interprets the monstrous lizard in the tale as a dinosaur being described in terms that would have been familiar to the Yuchi.

The Yuchi have another tale about giant lizards. They believe that a titanic battle between a giant lizard from the land and a giant lizard from the water that was so calamitous that it "shook the earth". These stories about gigantic ancient reptiles now attributed to dinosaurs may be evidence that Yuchi medicine men once encountered the Cretaceous fossils preserved west of the Mississippi River while on vision quests. Following the release of Jurassic Park to theatres the Yuchi people have replaced the phrase giant lizard with dinosaur. When the Yuchi attended the opening of the Oklahoma Natural History Museum they identified Saurophaganax maximus as the giant lizard of their traditions.

=== Scientific research ===
Among the important early fossil discoveries in Tennessee was a possible candidate for the first known occurrence of amber discovered in the 1800s near Savannah. Another major event occurred in 1920. At that time fossils extracted from Pleistocene deposits near Nashville had been shipped to the Carnegie Museum. A pit excavated into the floodplain sediments east of the Cumberland River uncovered a deer antler, the lower left molar from the horse Equus leidyi, and limb bones from another horse species called Equus complicatus. Higher in the deposits excavators turned up turtle bones, a molar left by a juvenile mastodon, Camelops fossils, a molar from the giant ground sloth Mylodon harlani.

== Natural history museums ==
- Frank H. McClung Museum, Knoxville
- Gray Fossil Site and Museum, Gray
- Middle Tennessee Museum of Natural History, Murfreesboro
- Pink Palace Museum and Planetarium, Memphis

== See also ==
- Paleontology in Arkansas
- Paleontology in Georgia
- Paleontology in Kentucky
- Paleontology in Mississippi
- Paleontology in Missouri
- Paleontology in Virginia
