= Paleontology in West Virginia =

Paleontological research in the U.S. state of West Virginia

The location of the state of West Virginia

Paleontology in West Virginia refers to paleontological research occurring within or conducted by people from the U.S. state of West Virginia. West Virginia's fossil record begins in the Cambrian. From that time through the rest of the early Paleozoic, the state was at least partially submerged under a shallow sea. The Paleozoic seas of West Virginia were home to creatures like corals, eurypterids, graptolites, nautiloids, and trilobites at varying times. During the Carboniferous period, the sea was replaced by lushly vegetated coastal swamps. West Virginia is an excellent source of fossil plants due to these deposits. These swamps were home to amphibians. A gap in the local rock record spans from the Permian to the end of the Cenozoic. West Virginia was never the site of glacial activity during the Ice Age, but the state was home to creatures like mammoths, mastodons, and giant ground sloths. One local ground sloth, Megalonyx jeffersonii, was subject to the scholarly investigations of Thomas Jefferson, who misinterpreted the large-clawed remains as belonging to a lion-like predator. In 2008, this species was designated the West Virginia state fossil.

== Prehistory ==
=== Paleozoic ===
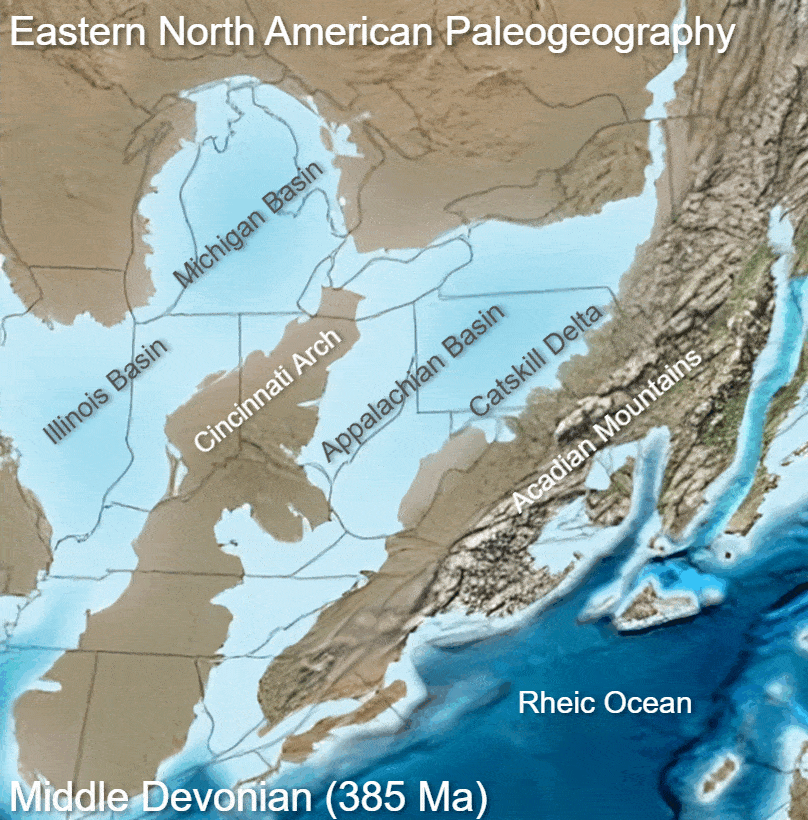
Paleogeographic reconstruction showing the Appalachian Basin area during the Middle Devonian period.

About 500 million years ago during the Cambrian period, West Virginia was almost completely covered by a shallow sea. This sea was inhabited by graptolites, stromatolites, trilobites, and worms. The abundant fossils of the Cambrian Antietam Formation are the oldest evidence of life in the state. West Virginia's Cambrian sea persisted on into the ensuing Ordovician. West Virginia was home to graptolites at that time and they left their remains behind in what would later become dark colored shales. At the same time, mountains were being uplifted in the eastern part of the state. West Virginia's Silurian rocks preserve evidence for the mixing of both marine and non-marine environments. Silurian evaporites left by extremely salty seawater during a dry climate preserved West Virginian eurypterids. Other Silurian life forms of West Virginia included nautiloids with straight shells and an abundance of ostracods. Late in the Devonian the sea quickly withdrew to the west. The Hampshire Formation's continental red beds were deposited during this regression. During the transition from the Silurian to Early Devonian West Virginia was home to corals, whose remains fossilized by silicification. During the Late Devonian the state's seas had begun filling in with sediments eroded from mountains outside of the state.

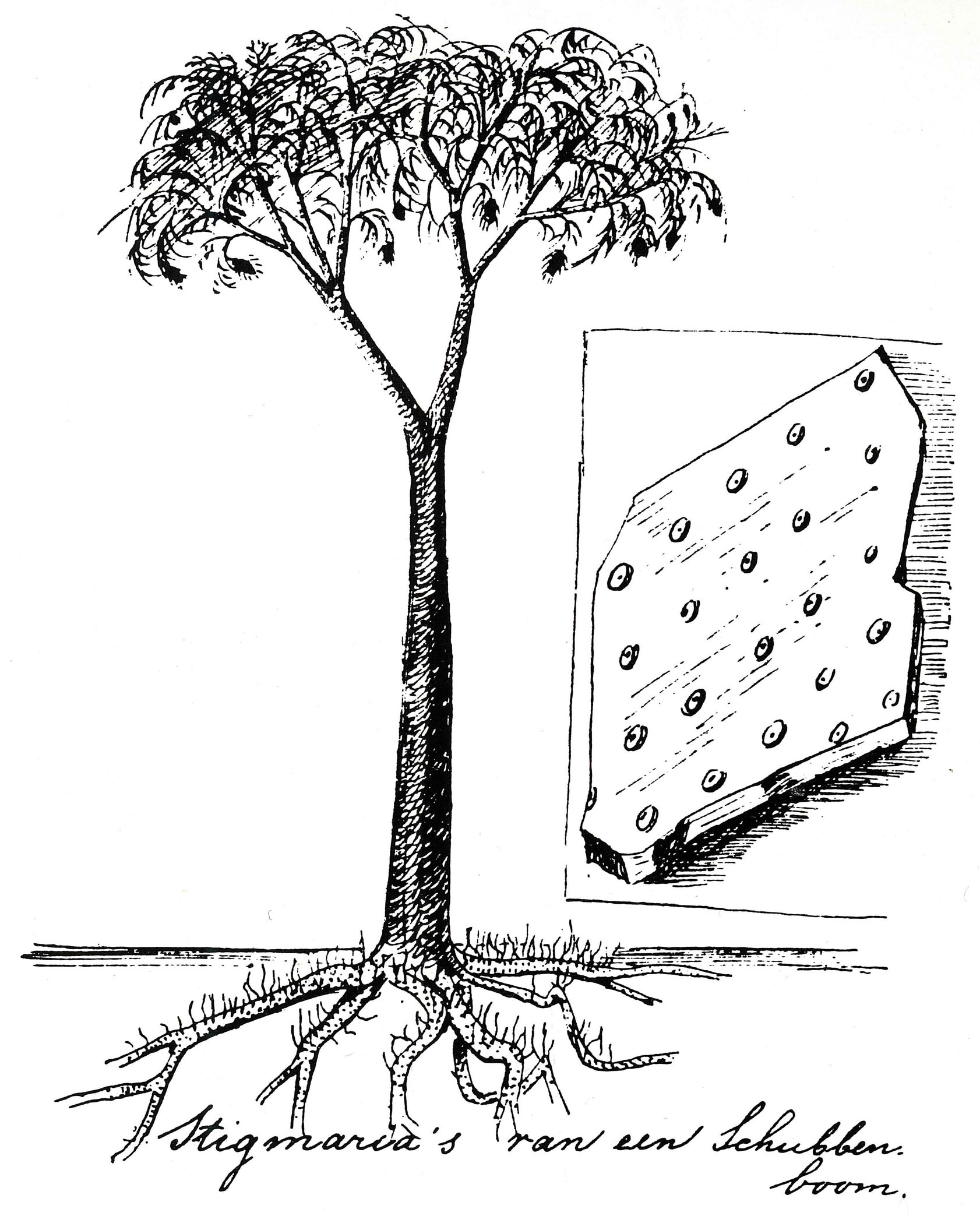
Reconstruction of Lepidodendron.

However, the state would once more be submerged during the early part of the Carboniferous period. By the Middle Mississippian, the sea had once more expanded its boundaries over the state. In the process it deposited the Greenbrier Formation, which was the last stratigraphic unit of significance to have been laid down in a marine environment. By 310 million years ago, the Mississippian was ending and West Virginia was dry land. West Virginia was swampy during the late Mississippian and its lush flora left behind many plant fossils. During the Mississippian, West Virginia was home to anthracosaur amphibians. One was a long-bodied form about 80 cm long that left behind footprints classified as the ichnospecies Hylopus hamesi. This trackmaker may have been Protergyrinus scheelei, a Mississippian amphibian known from body fossils in West Virginia. The tracks reveal that it was capable of both walking on land and swimming.

Into the Pennsylvanian, the local elevation was low and on brief occasions West Virginia fell below sea level. Huge river systems formed great deltas. Swamps were abundant across West Virginia at the time, and these became its modern coal seams. The dense vegetation of these swamps left behind many plant fossils. The Carboniferous coal swamps of West Virginia were dominated by ground pines of the genus Lepidodendron that could reach more than 100 feet in height. Sigilaria, however, was the largest tree and could be up to six feet in diameter at the base. Other Carboniferous plant fossils in West Virginia include the leaves of seed ferns Alethopteris. Other Pennsylvanian West Virginian seed ferns included Callipteridium, Callipteris, Lescuropteris, and Linopteris. Neuropteris was a contemporary fern-like plant. The true fern Pecopteris also grew in West Virginia during the Pennsylvanian. Amphibians also inhabited in these swamps.

Between 270 and 255 million years ago, during the Permian period, the Appalachian Mountains began to form. West Virginia began losing sediments to erosion rather than accumulating them. No part of West Virginia has been covered in seawater since the Appalachians began rising.

=== Mesozoic and Cenozoic ===
There are no Triassic, Jurassic, or Cretaceous rocks are present in West Virginia, so the entire Mesozoic is missing from the state's rock record. As such, no dinosaur fossils have ever been discovered in West Virginia.

The ensuing Paleogene and Neogene periods of the Cenozoic era is also missing from the state's rock record. During the Ice Age the glaciers never extended sufficiently far south to cross into West Virginia, but during their southernmost extent they nearly approached the northern panhandle. The glaciers dammed the Monongahela River system, forming a lake that extended as far south as Weston. Local wildlife included mammoths, mastodons, and giant ground sloths, who left their remains behind in local caves. One of the most well known fossils from West Virginia is the American cheetah (Miracinonyx inexpectatus).

== History ==
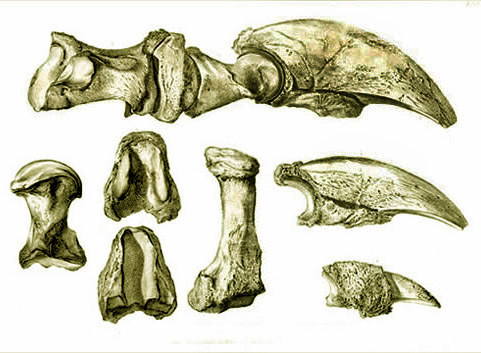
Claws of M. jeffersonii

Near the end of the 18th century, workers operating saltpeter vats in a cave then considered part of Greenbrier County, Virginia discovered fossil limb bones. In 1796, man named John Stuart sent these remains to Thomas Jefferson. Jefferson recognized them as being from a genus unknown to science and named the creature Megalonyx. The cave from which these fossils were taken later came to be identified with Organ Cave. Since the Industrial Revolution, the process of mining coal has responsible for many discoveries of fossil trackways. Some have been discovered serendipitously in West Virginia. Such discoveries frequently occur when the excavation of coal mines removes the rock underlying the trackway, leaving it exposed on the tunnel's ceiling. More recently, in 1990, Frederick A. Sundberg, and other colleagues erected the new ichnospecies Hylopus hamesi to hold fossil amphibian footprints from the latest Mississippian Bluefield Formation. This ichnospecies represented the oldest evidence for terrestrial vertebrates in the eastern United States. Based on the anatomy of the foot responsible for the traces, the researchers concluded that the tracks were left by anthracosaurs, possibly the species Protergyrinus scheelei, which was also known from West Virginia's Mississippian deposits. Variations in the structure of the trackways suggested that some of them were left while the animal was swimming, and thus the tracks suggest it was capable of walking on land and swimming underwater.

In 1993, two pieces of a Megalonyx shoulder blade were found in Haynes Cave of Monroe County, West Virginia, suggesting it may have been the true location where the Megalonyx bones examined by Thomas Jefferson were discovered, rather than Organ Cave. In 1995 Fred Grady further debunked the association between the Megalonyx fossils and Organ Cave since the original discovery site was owned at the time of the discovery by a man named Frederic Gromer, who had never owned Organ Cave. However, he did own Haynes Cave. Additional details gleaned from descriptions of Haynes Cave taken from the correspondence of subsequent owner, Tristram Patton, add more evidence that it was the true site of the discovery of Megalonyx. In 2008 Megalonyx jeffersonii, would be designated the West Virginia state fossil.

== Natural history museums ==
- West Virginia Geological and Economic Survey Museum
- Grave Creek Mound Archaeological Complex, Moundsville West Virginia
- The Lost World Caverns Visitor Center and Natural History Museum
- Bluestone Museum
- West Virginia Natural History Museum, Morgantown

== Events ==
- Morgantown Gem, Mineral, and Fossil Show
- Kanawha Gem, Mineral, and Fossil Show

== Private and commercial enterprises ==
- PrehistoricStore.com
- Sunset Fossils and Minerals

== See also ==
- Paleontology in Kentucky
- Paleontology in Maryland
- Paleontology in Ohio
- Paleontology in Pennsylvania
- Paleontology in Virginia
- Timeline of paleontology in West Virginia
