= Timeline of paleontology in West Virginia =

This timeline of paleontology in West Virginia is a chronologically ordered list events in the history of paleontological research occurring within or conducted by people from the U.S. state of West Virginia.

== 18th century ==
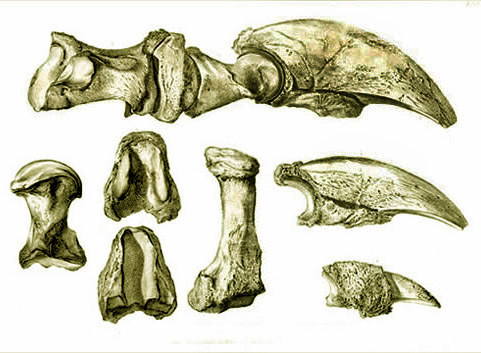
Claws of Megalonyx jeffersonii

=== 1790s ===
==== 1796 ====
- A man named John Stuart sent some limb bones discovered by workers operating saltpeter vats in a cave then considered part of Greenbrier County, Virginia to Thomas Jefferson. Jefferson recognized them as being from a genus unknown to science and named the creature Megalonyx. The cave from which these fossils were taken later came to be identified with Organ Cave.

== 20th century ==
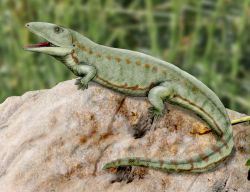
The anthracosaur Proterogyrinus may have left behind fossil footprints in West Virginia.

=== 1990 ===
- Frederick A. Sundberg, and other colleagues erected the new ichnospecies Hylopus hamesi to hold fossil amphibian footprints from the latest Mississippian Bluefield Formation. This ichnospecies represented the oldest evidence for terrestrial vertebrates in the eastern United States. Based on the anatomy of the foot responsible for the traces, the researchers concluded that the tracks were left by anthracosaurs, possibly the species Protergyrinus scheelei, which was also known from West Virginia's Mississippian deposits. Variations in the structure of the trackways suggested that some of them were left while the animal was swimming, and thus the tracks suggest it was capable of walking on land and swimming underwater.

=== 1993 ===
- Two pieces of a Megalonyx shoulder blade were found in Haynes Cave of Monroe County, West Virginia, suggesting it may have been the true location where the Megalonyx bones examined by Thomas Jefferson were discovered, rather than Organ Cave.

=== 1995 ===
- Fred Grady further debunked the association between the Megalonyx fossils and Organ Cave since the original discovery site was owned at the time of the discovery by a man named Frederic Gromer, who had never owned Organ Cave. However, he did own Haynes Cave. Additional details gleaned from descriptions of Haynes Cave taken from the correspondence of subsequent owner, Tristram Patton, add more evidence that it was the true site of the discovery of Megalonyx.

== 21st century ==
=== 2008 ===
- Megalonyx jeffersonii was designated the West Virginia state fossil.

== See also ==
- Paleontology in West Virginia
