= Paleontology in Kentucky =

Paleontological research in the U.S. state of Kentucky

The location of the state of Kentucky

Paleontology in Kentucky refers to paleontological research occurring within or conducted by people from the U.S. state of Kentucky.

Kentucky's abundance of exposed sedimentary rock makes it an ideal source of fossils. The geologic column of Kentucky contains rocks deposited during the Ordovician, Silurian, Devonian, Mississippian and Pennsylvanian periods. The state was first home to a warm shallow sea home to an abundance and variety of brachiopods, cephalopods, crinoids, and trilobites. During the Devonian, a large reef system formed at what is now the Falls of the Ohio. Swamps covered Kentucky during the ensuing Carboniferous period. From the start of the Permian to the Pleistocene, there is a large gap in the geologic record, although the gap is interrupted by minor deposits of Cretaceous and Eocene rocks, which mainly preserve plant fossils. Ice Age Kentucky was home to short-faced bear, bison, elk, lions, mammoths, mastodons, and giant ground sloths, which can be found fossilized at Big Bone Lick. Brachiopods are the Kentucky state fossil.

== Prehistory ==
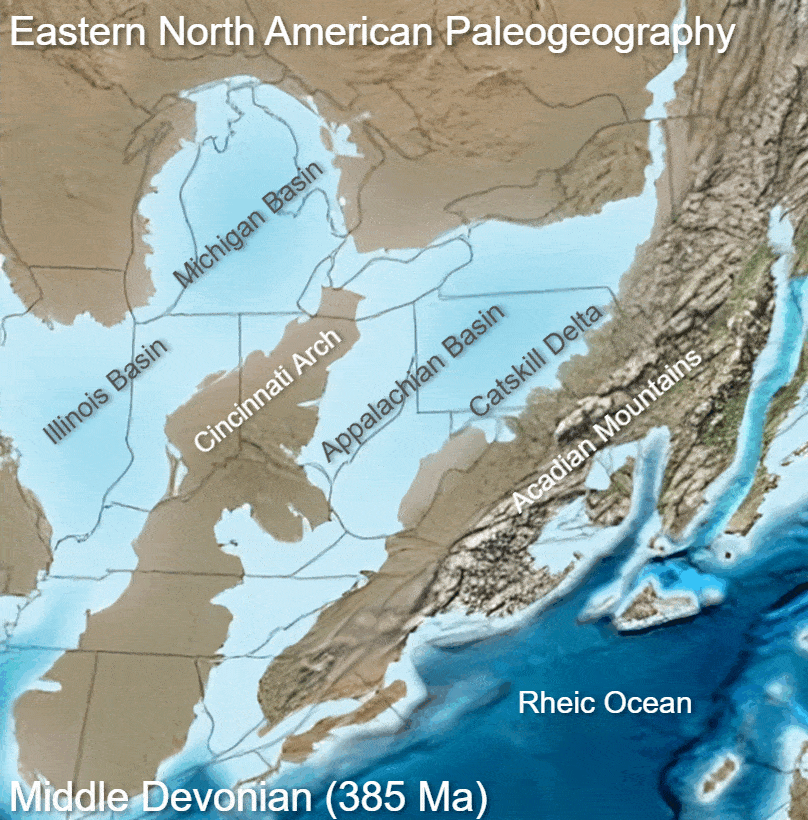
Paleogeographic reconstruction showing the Appalachian Basin area during the Middle Devonian period.

The oldest exposed rocks in Kentucky are of Ordovician age. At this time Kentucky was covered by a shallow, warm sea. The carbonate rocks of Kentucky deposited during this period are regarded as "world-class" sources of fossils. Marine conditions continued to prevail during the Silurian. Brachiopods are the most common fossil from the period in Kentucky, but bryozoans were also preserved in abundance. Other Silurian life forms of Kentucky included gastropods, pelecypods, cephalopods, crinoids, trilobites, and a variety of corals. The seas of Kentucky were still present during the ensuing Devonian. No fishes are known from the Devonian deposits in Kentucky, in fact fossils of this age are generally uncommon. However, the fossil reef located at the Falls of the Ohio is one of the best preserved and most famous in North America. By the late Devonian, local dissolved oxygen levels dropped precipitously.

Mississippian life left an abundant fossil record in Kentucky. Life of that time period included abundant bryozoans and corals, a diverse variety of crinoids and some conodonts. The Mississippian carbonates of southern Kentucky are also very rich in fossils. The rich flora of Kentucky's Late Mississippian swamps left behind many fossils. Other aquatic fossils of Kentucky include the bones, scales, and teeth of fishes, including shark remains. During the Pennsylvanian Kentucky's environment tended to be drier than it was earlier in the Paleozoic, with both land and sea fossils being represented in rocks of this age. The state's Pennsylvanian marine life included brachiopods, pelecypods, gastropods, cephalopods, anthozoans (corals and their relatives), echinoids, bryozoans, and crustaceans. The state's coal beds are the remnants of ancient peat swamps. Fossil tree trunks and other plant fossils are often found in the rocks above coal beds. The ancient swamps of Pennsylvanian Kentucky left behind many fossils. A fossil trackway preserved in McCreary County is among the oldest fossil evidence for the existence of reptiles.

The interval spanning the Permian Period and Mesozoic Era are almost completely absent from the state's rock record. Little is known about Kentucky's Permian history except that the sea withdrew to the far western corner of the state during this period. There are also a few Cretaceous deposits in the state formed in both marine and terrestrial environments. Very few fossils are known from the Cretaceous life of Kentucky. Among these scarce remains, however, were plants. Dinosaur fossils have not been found in Kentucky.

Like the Cretaceous, the geologic record of Kentucky contains deposits left on both land and sea during the Tertiary. Also like the Cretaceous, Kentucky preserves plant fossils from this age. Kentucky's Tertiary flora left behind fossil fruits, cones, flower petals and stems in places like Ballard, Graves, and Fulton Counties. The Wickliffe area of Ballard County has been the source of at least 27 new plant species from that time period. The presence of termites in the state at this time is attested to by the existence of a single fossil wing preserved 2.5 miles south of Columbus. The Tertiary marine life of Kentucky included marine mollusks. Fish were also present and sometimes their scales would fossilize. Pliocene to Pleistocene invertebrate fossils are common in Fayette County. Glaciers intruded into the northernmost part of the state. The vertebrates from this interval of time outside of Big Bone Lick include giant beavers in eastern Kentucky and tapirs in Fayette County. Other local wildlife included short-faced bear, bison, elk, lions, mammoths, mastodons, and giant ground sloths. Fossils from animals like these are widespread throughout the state and preserved in a variety of contexts. Among the types of deposits preserving mammals of this age are caves, ponds, river gravel, salt licks, sinkholes, and mineral springs.

== History ==
=== Indigenous interpretations ===
The Wyandot Indians interpreted trace fossils in Kentucky as being left by the Little People, who were believed to have exterminated the dangerous Witch Buffalo of the early world. The story of the Witch Buffaloes describes them as immense female buffalos as tall as trees whose horns stuck straight out of their foreheads. They were said to have lived around a spring of clean water where Big Bone Lick now stands. The Witch Buffaloes kept the local people and wildlife away from their spring, so the indigenous people couldn't hunt or collect salt from the lick. Then one day the Little People came and killed the Witch Buffaloes, making the area safe. The bones of the Witch Buffalo were left in place by the spring, which later shrank and became bitter. This is how the Wyandot people explained the area's large fossil bones and salty water. The large Pleistocene buffalo fossils of the Ohio River area would have been recognizable as similar but larger relatives of modern buffalo to the local Iroquois and Wyandot people, which may have inspired the legend.

Another Native American tale that may have been inspired by the fossils of Kentucky was told by the Iroquois. According to one legend, the first Iroquois war party to cross the Ohio River camped in Kentucky. However, a monster called the furious lizard attacked them and killed all but one warrior, who managed to kill the beast. Although there's no explicit mention of unusual bones in the story, local fossils still may have been an influence on the story's contents.

Another Iroquois tale is more explicitly connected to Kentucky fossils; they had a story describing the origins of Big Bone Lick. The Iroquois believe that an Iroquois war party was returning from battles with the Cherokee in the southern US. While on their return voyage, one of their number became too sick to make the homeward journey. The rest of the war party abandoned him to die and upon their return told the rest of the village that their abandoned comrade had actually died in battle.

However, the sick warrior recovered and managed to find his way home. When he arrived he told the villagers an unusual story. He said that while he was sick he saw three Little People arrive in a canoe. They said they were heading to a nearby salt lick inhabited by strange animals. The Little People were going to kill these beasts as they rose up out of the ground. The Iroquois warrior watched as a male and two female giant buffalo-like monsters burst out of the ground and were slain by the Little People's arrows. The Little People helped treat his sickness and guided the Iroquois warrior home. The villagers punished the warriors who had abandoned their comrade and planned an expedition to visit the lick. When they arrived they found the gigantic bones of the creatures killed by the Little People.

=== Scientific research ===
During the 1700s fossils collected from a salt lick called Big Bone Lick inspired interest in local fossils. The quality and importance of Big Bone Lick as a fossil site rivals that of the similarly aged Rancho La Brea tar pits. Fossils from Big Bone Lick would come to be studied by major figures in early America like Thomas Jefferson and Benjamin Franklin. In July 1739 a French military expedition comprising 123 French soldiers and 319 Native American warriors left Quebec under the command of Charles Le Moyne, Baron de Longueuil to help defend New Orleans from the Chickasaw, who were attacking the city on behalf of England. While on their journey down the Ohio River towards the Mississippi, they camped in what is now Kentucky. Some of the expeditions Native members formed a hunting party and embarked to acquire that evening's meal. When they returned that evening their canoes were laden with massive fossils including long tusks, massive teeth, and a thighbone almost as tall as a person. The source of their fossils was the site now known as Big Bone Lick. This find is considered the first major scientifically documented fossil discovery in American vertebrate paleontology. Near the end of 1740, Baron Charles de Longueuil departed from New Orleans to France, carrying with him fossils from Big Bone Lick. Longueuil left a large femur, three molars, and a tusk at the Cabinet du Roi. The Cabinet du Rois was a collection of curiosities stored in the chateau of the king's botanical garden. In 1756, mineralogist Jean-Etienne Guettard published a scientific paper in Paris, France with two illustrations of one of the molars Longueuil brought from Big Bone Lick to France. Although the focus of Guettard's paper was a comparison of the geology of North America with that of Switzerland, the inclusion of the illustrated molar marked the paper as the first publication to include images of an American vertebrate fossil.

In 1767 George Crogan (an Indian agent) sent three molars, four tusks, and a vertebra to Benjamin Franklin, who was in England at the time. Benjamin Franklin wrote back to George Croghan that August about the fossils shipped from Big Bone Lick. Franklin was amazed that the tusks resembled those of an elephant, yet the molars resembled those of a carnivorous animal. Franklin also wondered at the fact that the elephant-like fossils of Big Bone Lick and Siberia were found in places so much colder than places modern elephants live. He speculated that maybe earth was in a different position in the past and its climate correspondingly different. Frontiersman Daniel Boone visited Big Bone Lick in 1770 and examined its fossils. By December, 1780 George Washington himself remarked owned a molar extracted from a large unknown animal's skull discovered at Big Bone Lick.

In December, 1781 Thomas Jefferson gave a letter to Daniel Boone to be delivered to General George Rogers Clark, who was living in Louisville. The letter reminded Clark that he had offered to send Jefferson some fossils from Big Bone Lick. He was especially hopeful that Clark might send him one of each kind of tooth in the animal's skull. In February, 1782 Clark wrote back to Jefferson replying that he had unable to acquire any fossils at the Lick except for a broken thigh bone. However, Clark also added that he would send soldiers to the Lick to acquire the best possible specimens. That November, Thomas Jefferson wrote again to Clark asking for fossils, this time saying that there was no expense he would be unwilling to pay to obtain them. Despite Jefferson's fervent desire for fossils Clark was prevented from obtaining them by hostile Natives and harsh winter freezing. February, 1784 Clark wrote back to Jefferson, promising to send fossils although no-one knows if Clark was ever able to actually able to obtain them.

The next year, Jefferson published 200 copies of his Notes on the State of Virginia. The section on the minerals and animals of Virginia included a discussion of the "Mammoth". He rejected the idea that the mammoth could be extinct and drew from the lore of local indigenous people that to speculate that it may survive in the unexplored regions to the north and west of North America. He speculated that it had become locally extirpated in the east because the indigenous people had killed so much of the local game to trade their skins with European colonists. Jefferson refuted the proposal that the Big Bone Lick molars were hippopotamus molars while the tusks were of elephants by noting that both the tusks and molars are always found associated but with no elephant-like molars or hippopotamus bones present to make up the rest of the animals. He therefore concluded it was simpler to ascribe the remains to a single kind of animal. He also noted that the cusps on the teeth and the large size of its body distinguished it from both modern elephants and hippopotamus and the local climate was too cold for both besides. Jefferson disagreed with proposals that the Ohio River region must once have been warm enough to sustain elephant populations, but thought that the "mammoth" was instead an elephant-like animal suited to colder climates. Jefferson also saw the existence of the colossal mammoth as a strong rebuttal against the idea that the life of the New World was degenerate compared to life in the Old World. The mammoth quickly became a symbol of American patriotism and equality with the Old World. In 1795 future president William Henry Harrison filled 13 large barrels full of fossils taken from Big Bone Lick. He sent the fossils by boat to Pittsburgh, however since the specimens never made it they may have been lost in a shipwreck. During the 1790s James Taylor also made many trips to Big Bone Lick.

The collection of fossils at Big Bone Lick continued into the 19th century. As more and more fossils were uncovered the number of species represented at the site likewise grew. On September 6, 1807 William Clark and his brother George Rogers Clark arrived to obtain more fossils. William Clark reported that so many people had taken bones from the site that even after two weeks of effort it was difficult to find quality specimens. Nevertheless, the Clarks' expedition uncovered about 300 bones they felt of sufficient caliber to send to Thomas Jefferson. March of the next year, Jefferson received the fossils sent from the Clark excavation. Jefferson then invited Caspar Wistar of the American Philosophical Society in Philadelphia to help distribute the fossils. Jefferson gave most of the collection to Wistar for the Philosophical Society. Most of the remainder was donated to the National Institute of France, but Jefferson also allotted himself a small portion for his own personal natural history collection. Wistar presented a description in 1809 of some of the fossils Thomas Jefferson gave him, but later the manuscript was lost, delaying its publication. In 1818 he reconstructed much of the lost manuscript for a new paper reporting two new species from the Lick. One species combined the traits of elk and moose. This species would later become known as the stag-moose, or Cervalces scotti. Wistar also described the skull of a bison-like animal. Later research found the skull to be even more similar to modern musk oxen than bison and it was reclassified accordingly. More and more additions to the fauna accumulated as the 19th century proceeded, including remains of animals like the Harlan's ground sloth, and Jefferson's ground sloth. In 1923 Columbian mammoths were first recognized among fossils from Big Bone Lick even though these remains had been curated by the Academy for Natural Sciences since the early 1800s.

== Fossil genera found in Kentucky ==
Most fossil taxa found in Kentucky are marine invertebrates.

=== Bryozoans ===
The Middle and Late Ordovician deposits in Kentucky are exceptionally rich in bryozoans, but bryozoans can be found in Kentucky rocks all the way into the Pennsylvanian period. They may be Kentucky's most common type of fossil.

- Archimedes, a distinctive genus of Mississippian fenestrate bryozoan known for its screw-like skeletal structure
- Constellaria, a distinctive genus of Ordovician bryozoan recognizable by its star-shaped monticules
- Prasopora, an Ordovician genus of bryozoan
- Evactinopora, a Mississippian genus of bryozoan
- Amplexopora an Ordovician genus of bryozoan
- Cyphotrypa, an Ordovician genus of bryozoan
- Dekayella, an Ordovician genus of bryozoan
- Hemiphragma, an Ordovician genus of bryozoan
- Eridotrypa, an Ordovician genus of bryozoan
- Homotrypa, an Ordovician genus of bryozoan
- Homotrypella, an Ordovician genus of bryozoan
- Stigmatella, an Ordovician genus of bryozoan

=== Sponges ===
- Hindia, a Devonian genus of sponge
- Brachiospongia, an Ordovician genus of sponge.

=== Cnidarians ===
- Conularia
- Grewingkia
- Halysites

=== Brachiopods ===
- Platystrophia
- Rafinesquina
- Strophomena
- Orbiculoidea
- Hebertella
- Zygospira

=== Trilobites ===
- Isotelus
- Flexicalymene
- Gravicalymene
- Platylichas
- Proetidella
- Ceraurus
- Arctinurus
- Eomonorachus

== Protected areas ==
- Big Bone Lick State Park

== People ==
=== Births ===
- Edward Oscar Ulrich was born on 1 February 1857 in Covington.

== Natural history museums ==
- Cumberland Inn Museum - Henkelmann Life Science Collection, Williamsburg

== See also ==
- Geology of Kentucky
- Brachiopod
- Paleontology in Illinois
- Paleontology in Indiana
- Paleontology in Missouri
- Paleontology in Ohio
- Paleontology in Tennessee
- Paleontology in West Virginia
- Paleontology in Virginia
