= Paleontology in Illinois =

Paleontological research in the U.S. state of Illinois

The location of the state of Illinois

Paleontology in Illinois refers to paleontological research occurring within or conducted by people from the U.S. state of Illinois. Scientists have found that Illinois was covered by a sea during the Paleozoic Era. Over time this sea was inhabited by animals including brachiopods, clams, corals, crinoids, sea snails, sponges, and trilobites.

Fossils are common from the Ordovician through the Pennsylvanian. Illinois has a reputation for rocks bearing large numbers of trilobite fossils, often of very high preservational quality. There is a gap in Illinois' geologic record from the Mesozoic to the Pleistocene. During the Ice Age, Illinois was subject to glacial activity. At the time the state was home to creatures like giant beavers, mammoths, mastodons, and stag mooses.

Paleontology has a long history in the State of Illinois, stretching at least as far back as the 1850s, when the first Mazon Creek fossils were being found. Early in the ensuing 20th century a Silurian age fossil reef system was discovered in the state. In the 1950s Francis Tully discovered the "monster" that would later be named in his honor. The Pennsylvanian species Tullimonstrum gregarium ("Tully Monster") is the Illinois state fossil. It is one of the few officially designated state fossils that is endemic to the state it represents.

== Prehistory ==
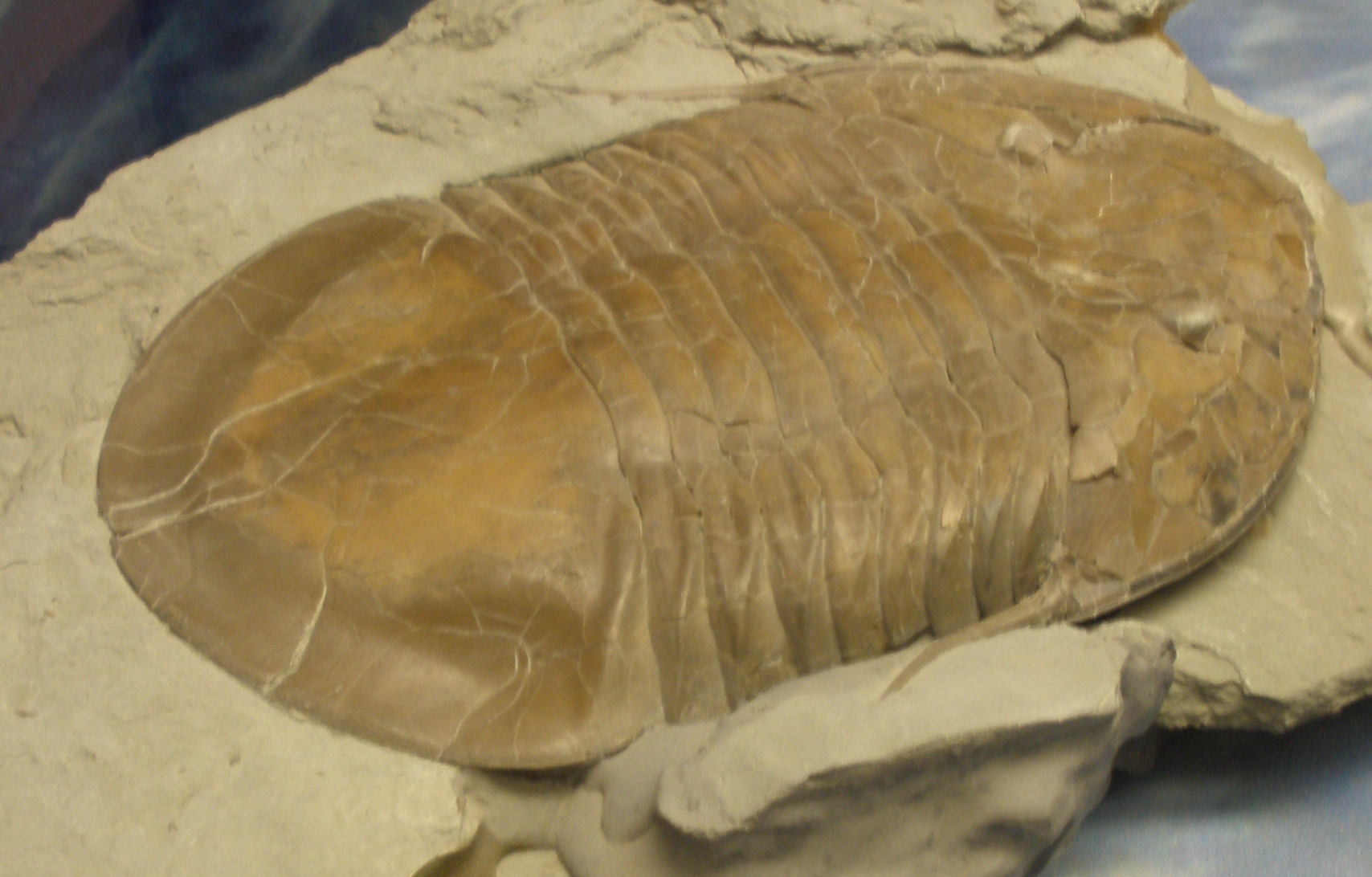
Isotelus.

No Precambrian fossils are known from Illinois. As such, the state's fossil record does not begin until the Paleozoic. Illinois was covered by a sea during the Paleozoic. Over time this sea would be inhabited by animals like brachiopods, clams, corals, crinoids, snails, sponges, trilobites. 500 million years ago, during the Cambrian, the seas of Illinois resembled those of the modern Bahamas. At the time, Illinois was located near the equator. Illinois was home to trilobites. Cambrian trilobites left their remains in the state's north-central region. In other areas of Illinois Cambrian trilobite fossils have only been found in core samples drilled from deeply buried rocks.

=== Ordovician ===
During the Ordovician, Illinois was still located near the equator and still covered by a shallow tropical sea. Graptolites reached their peak abundance in the state's history during this time. They left remains behind in the northern part of the state. Cephalopods were diverse during the Ordovician with some having straight shells and others being coiled. They left behind remains in northern and western Illinois.

Gastropods were common. "Sunflower coral" sponges were also common in north-central Illinois. Trilobites were still present and Ordovician rocks are a better source of trilobite fossils than the state's Cambrian deposits. However, this is due to the Ordovician rocks being more accessible to collectors than the older ones. Ordovician trilobites from Illinois included Isotelus and Ceraurus. Ordovician trilobites left behind remains in northern and southwestern Illinois.

Marine worms flourished in the bottom sediment of the sea that covered Illinois. Their presence is attested to be fossils of their jaws. After the Ordovician trilobite abundance and diversity declined significantly.

=== Silurian ===
Tropical marine conditions continued to persist into the Silurian. Trilobites were still present and like the Ordovician Silurian rocks are a better source of trilobite fossils than the state's Cambrian deposits. Also like the Ordovician, the superiority of Silurian rocks as a source of trilobites is due to the Silurian rocks being more accessible to collectors than the older ones. Silurian trilobites from Illinois include Dalmanites and Calymene. Silurian trilobites left behind remains in northern and southwestern Illinois.

Hindia sponges lived in the Silurian near Chicago. Another Silurian resident of the Chicago region were cystoids. Most of the state's cystoid fossils are preserved in deposits that formed in that place and time Jaws left by marine worms are even more common from the Silurian of northeastern Illinois than they were back in the Ordovician. Illinoisan trilobites diversity and abundance suffered further losses after the end of the Silurian Period.

=== Devonian ===
During the Devonian Illinois was still covered by the sea and had not drifted far north from the equator. Trilobites were still present. Devonian trilobites from Illinois included Phacops and Odontocephalus.

=== Mississippian ===
Illinois was still under seawater during the early Carboniferous. Bryozoans were very common all throughout Illinois during the Mississippian epoch. Brachiopods were also very common in the Mississippian of the Mississippi and Ohio River areas. Mississippian trilobites from Illinois included Brachmetopus.

=== Pennsylvanian ===
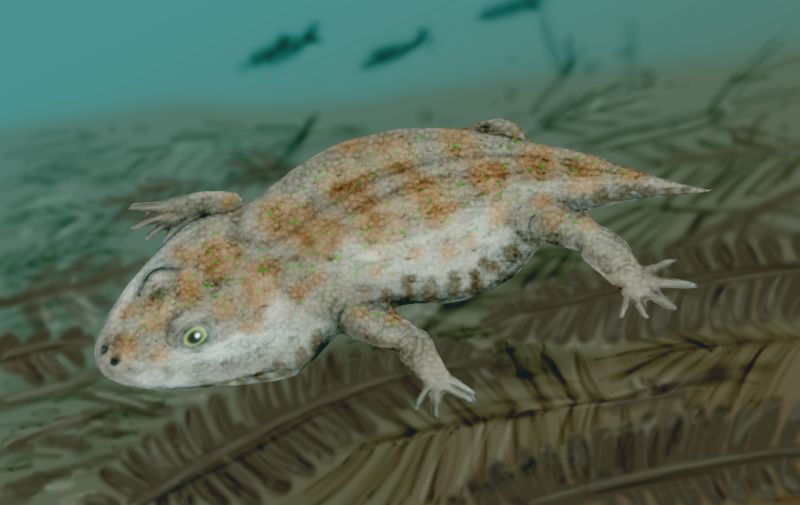
Amphibamus

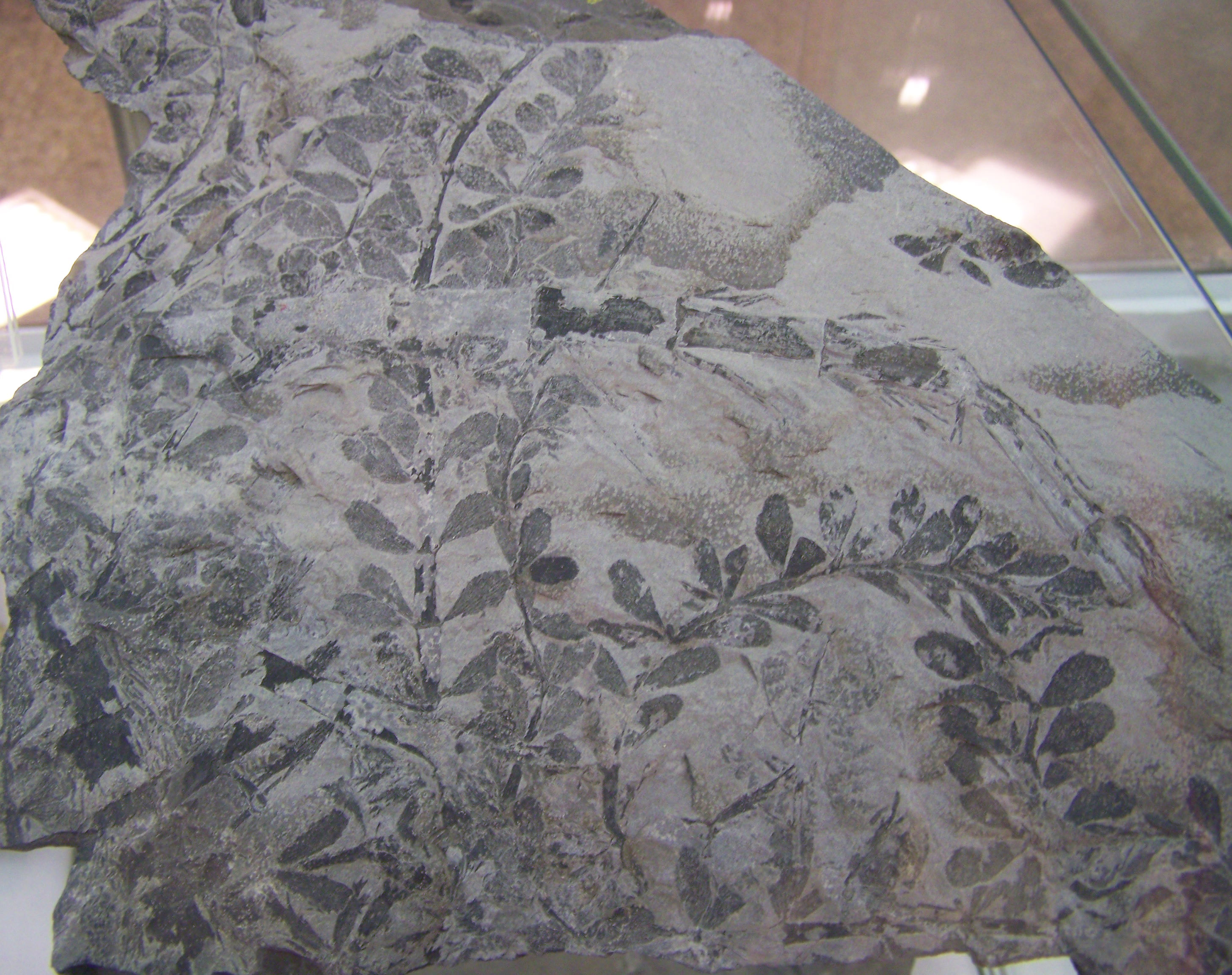
Sphenophyllum

Illinois was still located near the equator during the Pennsylvanian. Western and central Illinois was covered in swamps bordering the remnants of the shallow sea that once covered the state. Fusulinids are common in Pennsylvanian rocks. Shelled cephalopods were diverse during the Pennsylvanian with some having straight shells and others being coiled. Other inhabitants included the Tully monster, as well as animals recognizably related to modern life like shrimp, jelly fish, sharks and squid. Coelacanths were among the state's Pennsylvanian aquatic vertebrates. Gastropods were common. Clams were common in central Illinois during the Pennsylvanian. Illinoisan horseshoe crab fossils are only known from the Pennsylvanian of the Mazon Creek area. Trilobites were still present in Illinois and included Ameura and Ditomopyge.

325 million years ago Illinois was covered in heavily forested deltaic swamps. The trees composing this Pennsylvanian forest included Cordaites, scale trees, and seal trees. Some of these trees could grow over 100 feet high. The rest of the flora included scouring rushes, Sphenophyllum, ferns, and seed ferns. The fossils they left behind include casts, molds, compressions, and even entire plant preserved in nodules. Rivers running through the ancient swamps swept leaves and plant debris out to sea. The environment of Pennsylvanian Illinois was comparable to the modern Amazon River delta. Almost every Pennsylvanian deposit in Illinois preserves evidence of this ancient flora and such deposits are located in almost every region of the state. The vegetation of these ancient swamps became Illinois' modern coal deposits.

More than 130 kinds of insects inhabited the Pennsylvanian Mazon Creek area. The insects are typical for what one would expect to see in a woodland near the sea. Some of these insects were similar to modern forms like dragonflies, roaches, and damselflies. Others are unlike anything alive today. Other terrestrial invertebrate life included early scorpions and a variety of primitive spiders. Mazon Creek vertebrates included the small amphibian Amphibamus grandiceps, which may be a relative of the amphibian lineage that led up to frogs. Amphibians as large as ten feet in length lived in these swamps. Some early vertebrates preserved in the Mazon Creek's concretionary nodules have fossilized soft tissue.

A gap in the local rock record spans the entire Permian period, so there are no rocks of this age in Illinois in which fossils could have been preserved. However, one notable local event following the Pennsylvanian was the meteor impact that occurred near modern Des Plaines. Another is the extinction of the trilobites at the end of the Permian.

=== Mesozoic ===
Most of the Mesozoic era is also missing from the local rock record. This is because during that time sediments were generally being eroded away from Illinois rather than deposited. Nevertheless, a few Cretaceous deposits are known in the state. During the Cretaceous Illinois was home to foraminiferans. Contemporary local plants also left behind leaves that would later fossilize. No dinosaur remains have ever been found in Illinois. Although they probably lived in the area.

=== Cenozoic ===
Likewise, there are few rocks dating back to the ensuing Tertiary period of the Cenozoic era. Some wildlife from that time period were preserved in the far southern region of the state, but otherwise little is known about Tertiary Illinois. The fossil record does not become productive again until the Pleistocene. The area where modern Peoria is situated was home to the Mississippi river two million years ago. At the same time, the area where the modern University of Illinois Urbana-Champaign stands was home to the Mahomet River. At that time the Mississippi River flowed through Bureau and Henry counties. The Mahomet River joined it near Havana.

Illinois experienced its main periods of glaciation over the past 1.8 million years. These glaciers filled in the Mahomet River valley. The melting glaciers transported large amounts of sediment that filled in the original course of the Mississippi River, which took on its modern course. Other glacial melt water went on to form large lakes.

The advance and retreat of Illinois' glaciers coincided with cooling and warming spells of climate. During the warm spells Illinois was home to animals like jaguars, peccaries, and armadillos. During cold spells Illinois was home to animals like mammoths, mastodons, stag mooses, and giant beavers. Snowshoe hares also used to make their home in Illinois. The Illinoian (stage) glaciation occurred some 300,000 to 130,000 years ago. The last time glaciers covered Illinois was during the Wisconsin glaciation 25,000 years ago.

== History ==
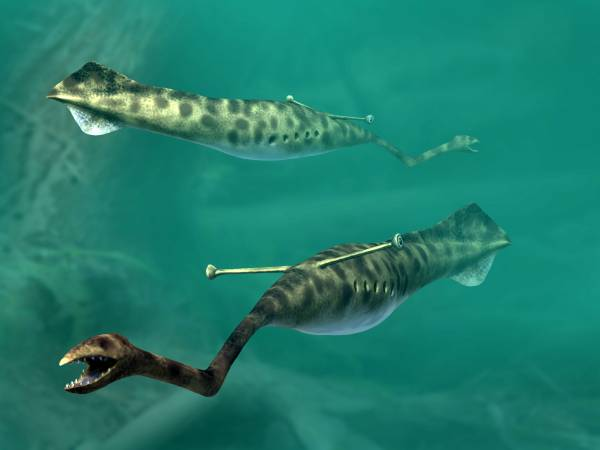
Restoration of the Tully monster.

As far back as the late 1850s significant fossil discoveries were occurring in Illinois. At this time fossils were discovered in nodules discovered at natural rock exposures along the Mazon Creek in Grundy County. Early in the 20th century, J. H. Bretz and H. A. Lowenstam studied the Silurian fossil reef systems of the Chicago area following a decline in scientific attention paid to the famous fossil reefs of similar age near Milwaukee, Wisconsin. Later, during the 1920s, strip mining for coal south of Braidwood generated piles of waste rock that would later become popular sites for fossil collection. These waste piles would later serve as the source for most Tully monster finds. During the late 1950s Francis Tully found a fossil he could not identify at the strip mines near Braidwood. He took the specimen to Chicago's Field Museum of Natural History. Researchers at the museum could not identify it either, and the specimen became known as Mr. Tully's monster. In 1966, Eugene Richardson, the Curator of Fossil Invertebrates of the Field Museum formally named the Tully monster Tullimonstrum gregarium. Finally, in 2016, scientists after reviewing over 1,000 fossilized Tully Monsters placed it in the same phylum as, and possibly related to, lampreys. The Tully monster is one of the few officially designated state fossils to be endemic to its state of origins.

== People ==
=== Births ===
- John Bell Hatcher was born in Cooperstown on October 11, 1861.
- Pierce Brodkorb was born in Chicago on September 29, 1908
- Charles Repenning was born in Oak Park on August 4, 1922
- Frederick Schram was born in Chicago on August 11, 1943.
- Sue Hendrickson was born in Chicago on December 2, 1949.
- Paul Sereno was born in Chicago on October 11, 1957.
- Ashley C. Morhardt was born in Barrington on September 17, 1983
- Stephen L. Brusatte was born in Ottawa on April 24, 1984

=== Deaths ===
- Bryan Patterson died in Chicago on December 1, 1979.

== Natural history museums ==
- Burpee Museum of Natural History, Rockford
- Elgin Public Museum, Elgin
- Field Museum of Natural History, Chicago
- Jurica-Suchy Nature Museum, Benedictine University, Lisle
- Illinois State Museum, Springfield
- Midwest Museum of Natural History, Sycamore (closed)
- Peggy Notebaert Nature Museum, Chicago

== Notable clubs and associations ==
- Earth Science Club of Northern Illinois
- International Fossil Exposition

== See also ==
- Paleontology in Indiana
- Paleontology in Iowa
- Paleontology in Kentucky
- Paleontology in Missouri
- Paleontology in Wisconsin

== Bibliography ==
- Animals Past and Present University of Illinois Extension. Accessed August 3, 2012.
- Dinosaur FAQ. Tour Through Time. Field Museum. Accessed August 3, 2012.
- Garcia, Frank A.; Donald S. Miller (1998). Discovering Fossils. Stackpole Books. pp. 212.
- Kolata, Dennis R. The Trilobite—An Early Inhabitant of Illinois. Geobit 6. Illinois State Geological Survey. 2004. 2 pp. Accessed August 3, 2012.
- Mayor, Adrienne. Fossil Legends of the First Americans. Princeton University Press. 2005.
- Mikulic, Donald G. The Reefs that Made Milwaukee Famous. Geoscience Wisconsin. Volume 18. 2001.
- Mikulic, D.G. and Kluessendorf, J. Illinois’ State Fossil— Tullimonstrum gregarium. Geobit 5. Illinois State Geological Survey. 2004. 2 pp. Accessed August 3, 2012.
- Murray, Marian (1974). Hunting for Fossils: A Guide to Finding and Collecting Fossils in All 50 States. Collier Books. p. 348.
- Theodor, Jessica, Judy Scotchmoor, Dale Springer. July 1, 2005. "Illinois, US." The Paleontology Portal. Accessed October 1, 2012.
- Vaiden, Robert C. Build Illinois: The Last 500 Million Years. Geonote 4. Illinois State Geological Survey. 2004. 12 pp. Accessed August 3, 2012.
