= Geology of Kentucky =

The geology of Kentucky formed beginning more than one billion years ago, in the Proterozoic eon of the Precambrian. The oldest igneous and metamorphic crystalline basement rock is part of the Grenville Province, a small continent that collided with the early North American continent. The beginning of the Paleozoic is poorly attested and the oldest rocks in Kentucky, outcropping at the surface, are from the Ordovician. Throughout the Paleozoic, shallow seas covered the area, depositing marine sedimentary rocks such as limestone, dolomite and shale, as well as large numbers of fossils. By the Mississippian and the Pennsylvanian, massive coal swamps formed and generated the two large coal fields and the oil and gas which have played an important role in the state's economy. With interludes of terrestrial conditions, shallow marine conditions persisted throughout the Mesozoic and well into the Cenozoic. Unlike neighboring states, Kentucky was not significantly impacted by the Pleistocene glaciations. The state has extensive natural resources, including coal, oil and gas, sand, clay, fluorspar, limestone, dolomite and gravel. Kentucky is unique as the first state to be fully geologically mapped.

== Stratigraphy, tectonics and geologic history ==
The oldest Precambrian igneous and metamorphic crystalline basement in Kentucky is only known from gravitational studies and boreholes and does not outcrop at the surface. The earliest rocks formed in the Proterozoic, east of the Grenville Front, as part of the continental crust of the Grenville Province, which collided with Proto-North America, kicking off the Grenville orogeny. In northern Kentucky mafic, felsic and metasedimentary rocks have similar abundances. A study in 1985 of 42 boreholes, spanning into central Ohio found 14 percent gabbro, eight percent metagabbro, 12 percent amphibolite, 12 percent hornblende gneiss and schist and two percent quartz diorite. Additionally, there is 33 percent granite, two percent granodiorite gneiss, seven percent metasedimentary rocks and 10 percent granite gneiss.

Metamorphism reached amphibolite-grade in the sequence of metamorphic facies. The northeast has slightly higher concentrations of granite as well as anorthosite.

=== Paleozoic (539–251 million years ago) ===
Throughout the Ordovician, Kentucky was covered in shallow tropical seas, depositing limestone, dolomite and shale. The region was the flooded continental shelf of Laurentia, situated in the Southern Hemisphere as part of the Iapetus Ocean, based on reconstructed paleogeography. The Camp Nelson Limestone along the Kentucky River gorge between Frankfort and Boonesboro dates to the Middle Ordovician and is the oldest rock exposed at the surface in the state. Additional mudstone and shale formation from the Late Ordovician indicates a shift to a shallower sea, which supported extensive marine life. Brachiopod, bryozoan, coral, sponge, crinoid, trilobite, conodont, ostracode and nautiloid fossils are very common in stream beds and road cuts in the Bluegrass Region.

Silurian rocks are not exposed in the Bluegrass Region, but is common in the surrounding Knobs Region. High sediment loads prevailed in the shallow tropical sea at first, forming additional shale. Silt and clay which formed the shale appears to have originated from the east, forming alternating units between carbonate layers. Shelly invertebrates and corals form the bulk of limestone and dolomite from the period. The Cincinnati Arch formed during the Silurian due to gentle folding and upwarped parts of the region above the water level, separating Kentucky into two geologic basins.

The upwarping of the arch continued into the Devonian, which is supported by the lack of Early Devonian rocks in central Kentucky where the arch formed. Devonian rocks are only exposed at the surface in the Knobs Region and are not present in the Bluegrass Region, although they are known from the sub-surface throughout the rest of the state. For the most part, shallow sea conditions prevailed with areas experiencing dry land conditions. By the late Devonian sea levels increased, resulting in poorly oxygenated deep water. Organic-rich black shales formed, ultimately producing oil and gas which is now extracted. Black shales hold broadly similar fossil assemblages to Silurian and Ordovician deposits, but have particularly well preserved calcareous stromatoporoid sponge fossils, which are found at the Falls of the Ohio close to Louisville.

By the Mississippian, Kentucky remained largely submerged and still south of the equator, but related to the merged continental mass of Euramerica. The closing of the Iapetus Ocean created the narrower Rheic Ocean, as the supercontinent Gondwana moved toward Euramerica. The Pennyroyal Region has exposed Mississippian rocks. Black shale deposition continued through the Early Mississippian, but rivers and streams shifted the sediment load to terrestrial material from the Appalachian uplands further east, delivering sand, mud and silt.

When sea levels dropped in the Middle Devonian, massive limestone formations took shape which now form much of the state's karst landscape and host the world's largest cave, Mammoth Cave. Coastal plains and tidal deltas periodically displaced the sea. By the Devonian, proliferation of fishes and land life increased the variety of fossils. Fish teeth became common alongside invertebrates and scale ferns, tree ferns, calamite trees and large amphibians lived on the land in estuaries and ox-bow lakes. In 1995, a single five foot long embolomere amphibian fossil was found in sandstone, near the margin of the Western Kentucky Coal Field.

In the Pennsylvanian, shallow seas existed periodically, but the landscape was mostly swampy land. As the supercontinent Pangaea took shape, Kentucky was situated on the equator. Grasses and cordaite trees joined the fossil record and dead vegetation was encapsulated in silts and sands, capped by delta clays, preventing oxidation. This material formed Kentucky's two main coal fields.

=== Mesozoic (251–66 million years ago) ===
The Late Permian, the Triassic and the early part of the Cretaceous—a span of 200 million years—is missing from the stratigraphic record. The rifting apart of Pangaea formed the Atlantic Ocean as North America shifted into the Northern Hemisphere. Small outcrops from the Cretaceous at the end of the Mesozoic are found in southwest Kentucky, near the state line with Tennessee, in the Jackson Purchase Region and parts of Mississippian Plateau. These sands, clays and gravels deposited at the flooded eastern edge of the Western Interior Seaway and never consolidated into rock.

=== Cenozoic (66 million years ago – present) ===
In the Paleogene and Neogene, in the Cenozoic brackish, freshwater and marine sediments deposited in the Jackson Purchase Region, the northern limit of the Mississippi Embayment. Thin beds of lignite and carbonaceous clays are common in the eight counties of the region.

Unlike neighboring states, with landscapes heavily changed by glaciations during the Pleistocene, ice sheets only reached Covington, Kentucky. Glaciation changed the course of the Ohio River, in the vicinity of Louisville and Cincinnati where glacial melt waters filled the valley with sand and gravel. Lake bottom sediments deposited locally where the Kentucky, Green, Licking and Salt rivers were temporarily impounded by glacial debris.

== Natural resource geology ==
Kentucky has extensive natural resources. Coal mining in Kentucky targets bituminous coal, which has played an important role in the state's economy for decades. In addition to coal and hydrocarbons, sand, gravel, dolomite and limestone are important resources. Unlike many areas, much of the sand production was from floating dredgers on the Ohio River, rather than exclusively dry-land quarries. In 1982, Kentucky ranked fourth among US states in clay production. Prior to 1979, three-quarters of the fluorspar produced in the US is sourced from the Illinois-Kentucky fluorspar district. The state legislature formed the Department for Natural Resources and the Environment in 1972.

Throughout the 1970s and 1980s, Kentucky led the US in coal production.

A well drilled in 1819 in salt water, in the South Fork of the Cumberland River revealed the first indications of petroleum in Kentucky. A rush to produce paraffin from oil in the 1850s prompted discoveries in Clinton, Cumberland, Allen, Barren, Meade, Wayne and Russell counties. A total of 4,755 barrels were produced in 1883. Major discoveries came after 1900, including the Big Sandy gas field, in Floyd County, Warfield Fork gas pool, Big Sinking pool, Campton pool, Sunnybrook pool and Ragland pool. Henderson County grew as a source, leading state production by the 1930s and World War II. The Greensburg pool in Green County was a major source found in the late 1950s, helping to drive total production to 27.27 million barrels by 1959.

The state legislature passed a drilling regulation in 1960 requiring permits for wells and creating the Water Pollution Control Commission. Due to poor record keeping, the exact number of wells is not known. However, the Kentucky Geological Survey estimated a cumulative total of 200,000 wells in 1992, with 23,000 oil wells and 11,000 gas wells producing in 1989. The Eastern Coal Field and Western Coal Field have been the mine sites of production, with little exploration in the Jackson Purchase and Bluegrass regions.

== See also ==
- Paleontology in Kentucky
