= Paleontology in Indiana =

Paleontological research occurring within or conducted by Indiana

The location of the state of Indiana

Paleontology in Indiana refers to paleontological research occurring within or conducted by people from the U.S. state of Indiana. Indiana's fossil record stretches back to the Precambrian, when the state was inhabited by microbes. More complex organisms came to inhabit the state during the early Paleozoic era. At that time the state was covered by a warm shallow sea that would come to be inhabited by creatures like brachiopods, bryozoans, cephalopods, crinoids, and trilobites. During the Silurian period the state was home to significant reef systems. Indiana became a more terrestrial environment during the Carboniferous, as an expansive river system formed richly vegetated deltas where amphibians lived. There is a gap in the local rock record from the Permian through the Mesozoic. Likewise, little is known about the early to middle Cenozoic era. During the Ice Age however, the state was subject to glacial activity, and home to creatures like short-faced bears, camels, mammoths, and mastodons. After humans came to inhabit the state, Native Americans interpreted the fossil proboscidean remains preserved near Devil's Lake as the bones of water monsters. After the advent of formal scientific investigation one paleontological survey determined that the state was home to nearly 150 different kinds of prehistoric plants.

== Prehistory ==
Indiana's fossil record stretches all the way back to the Precambrian. Microbe fossils of this age are known from the state. Later, during the Cambrian period, Indiana was located in equatorial latitudes. Indiana was also covered by a warm shallow sea. This sea was home to brachiopods, trilobites, and sponges. In the ensuing Ordovician period Indiana was still submerged by the sea. The state was home to brachiopods, bryozoans, cephalopods, crinoids, gastropods, pelecypods, and trilobites.

The Paleozoic sea covering Indiana remained in place during the Silurian Period. At the time northern and southwestern Indiana were covered in reefs composed of animals like corals and stromatoperoids. These reefs were situated at the edges of areas with greater depths of water both within and outside the state. The Terre Haute Reef Bank is located in the southwestern part of the state and contains more than 60 reefs. Some of these ancient reefs later proved economically significant to humans because the overlying rock would sometimes bear petroleum deposits or could be employed by utility companies as natural gas storage sites. The Fort Wayne Bank is located near the surface of the northern region of the state. More than 20 of the reefs have been mined for aggregate, which is reputedly of high quality. Other Indianan life during the Silurian included brachiopods, bryozoans, crinoids, eurypterids, gastropods, pelecypods, and trilobites.

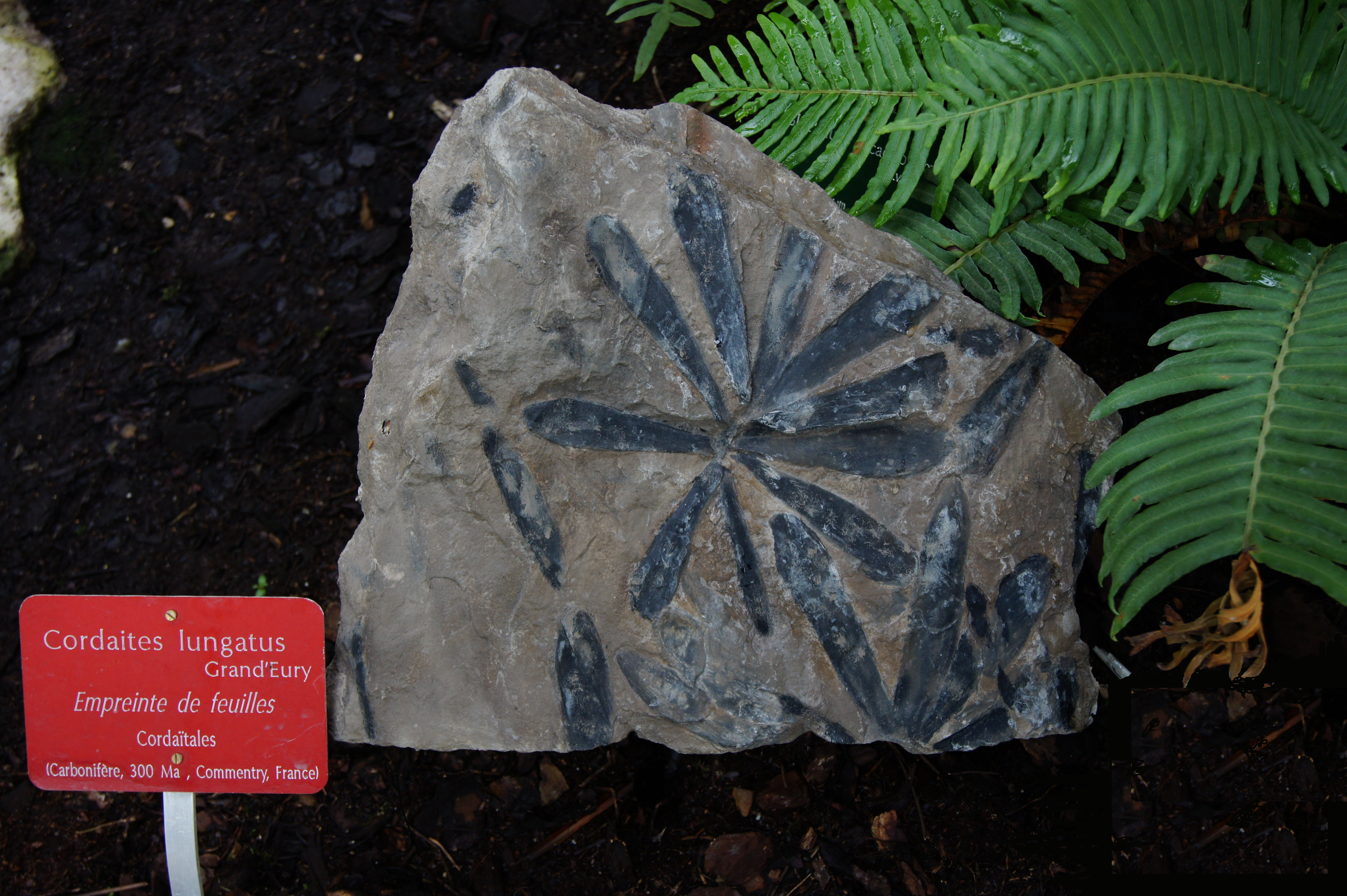
Cordaites.

The same sea that had covered Indiana since the Cambrian was still home to a variety of ancient life forms during the Devonian. Examples include brachiopods, bryozoans, corals, cephalopods, pelecypods, and trilobites. During the Carboniferous the state was home to river systems that formed vast deltas. The plants growing across these deltas would leave behind coal deposits. Wildlife of the Mississippian epoch included arthropods, brachiopod, bryozoans, cephalopods, corals, crinoids, foraminifera, fishes, molluscs, and trilobites. Pennsylvanian life of included amphibians, Calamites, Cordaites, lycopods, seed ferns, and true ferns.

There are no fossils in Indiana from the interval spanning across the Permian period and the entire Mesozoic era. At that time local sediments were being eroded away rather than deposited. As such, there are no rocks from this time in which fossils could have been preserved. Although dinosaurs probably lived in Indiana during the Mesozoic, the absence of rocks from the time means that there are no dinosaur fossils in the state.

Little is known about the Tertiary history of Indiana because there are so few rocks of this age in the state. Nevertheless, local vertebrates, invertebrates, and plants have been preserved in sinkholes. Later, during the ensuing Quaternary period, Indiana was worked over by glaciers. Indiana was inhabited by creatures like the birds, camels, fishes, peccaries, the short-faced bear, rodents, snakes, and turtles. In nearly recent times the biota of Indiana included dire wolves, gastropods, mammoths, mastodons, pelecypods, plants (which left both body and pollen fossils), and saber-toothed cats.

== History ==
Native Americans were familiar with fossils. In Indiana, the Potawatomi people attributed Ice Age proboscidean remains to ancient water monsters because the fossils were found in and around Devil's Lake. Later, formal scientific paleontology got underway in Indiana. One early Indiana research project began during the mid twentieth century, between 1953 and 1954. A state field project surveyed Indiana's fossil plants. This survey discovered a much higher diversity of fossil plants than anticipated, and highlighted their under-appreciated scientific significance. In total the survey uncovered 146 species of prehistoric plants in 68 genera at 93 fossil sites. Indiana's plant fossils are useful for correlating individual coal seams.

== People ==
- Elmer S. Riggs was born in Trafalgar on January 23, 1869.

== Natural history museums ==
- The Indiana Dinosaur Museum, South Bend
- The Children's Museum of Indianapolis, Indianapolis
- Indiana State Museum, Indianapolis
- Joseph Moore Museum, Richmond
- Sumner B. Sheets Museum of Wildlife and Marine Exhibits, Huntington

== See also ==
- Paleontology in Illinois
- Paleontology in Kentucky
- Paleontology in Michigan
- Paleontology in Ohio
- Pipe Creek Sinkhole
