= Haynes Cave =

Cave in West Virginia, United States

Coordinates: 37.688°N 80.483°W

Haynes Cave is a cave within the Greenbrier River watershed in West Virginia. It sits within the complex hydrology of the historic Second Creek watershed in Monroe County.

Haynes Cave has been the only contender against Organ Cave as the discovery site for Thomas Jefferson's famous fossil of Megalonyx jeffersonii ("Jefferson's ground sloth"). The lack of accurate records and the vagueness of the locality description left much doubt about the original location of the sloth skeleton.

It was known that the saltpeter miners in the cave were using one of the sloth's leg-bones to prop up a saltpeter vat to aid in the process of manufacturing gunpowder niter, but this leg was lost to time. Both Thomas Jefferson and the initial discoverer, Colonel John Stuart, hoped to find the skull of the beast, for the teeth would reveal its proper identity as a carnivore or herbivore.

In 1797, Thomas Jefferson presented a paper on the bones to the American Philosophical Society in Philadelphia. Jefferson is credited for initiating the science of vertebrate paleontology in the United States with the reading of his 1797 paper. The paper was later published, in 1799. Jefferson chose the name Megalonyx, meaning "Great-Claw," for the skeletal remains that he described. The "certain bones" consisted of three large claws and associated smaller bones. Jefferson initially thought the remains were of a giant carnivore, and compared them to the bones of the African lion. In a footnote to the published article, he corrected his interpretation, comparing the remains to those of a giant ground sloth, Megatherium, from Argentina. In an accompanying paper in the same volume as Jefferson's paper, 1799, Caspar Wistar published drawings of the fossils and a more detailed description. Wistar correctly identified the remains as belonging to a giant ground sloth. In 1822 A.G. Desmarest named the species Megalonyx jeffersonii in his honor.

On September 19, 2008, the official news of this significant fossil discovery was released, and carbon dating from a Haynes Cave sloth scapula was proven a match to the skeleton excavated by John Stuart of Greenbrier County. Since March 2008, the Megalonyx has been the official "state fossil" of West Virginia.
