= Organ Cave =

Historic cave in West Virginia, United States

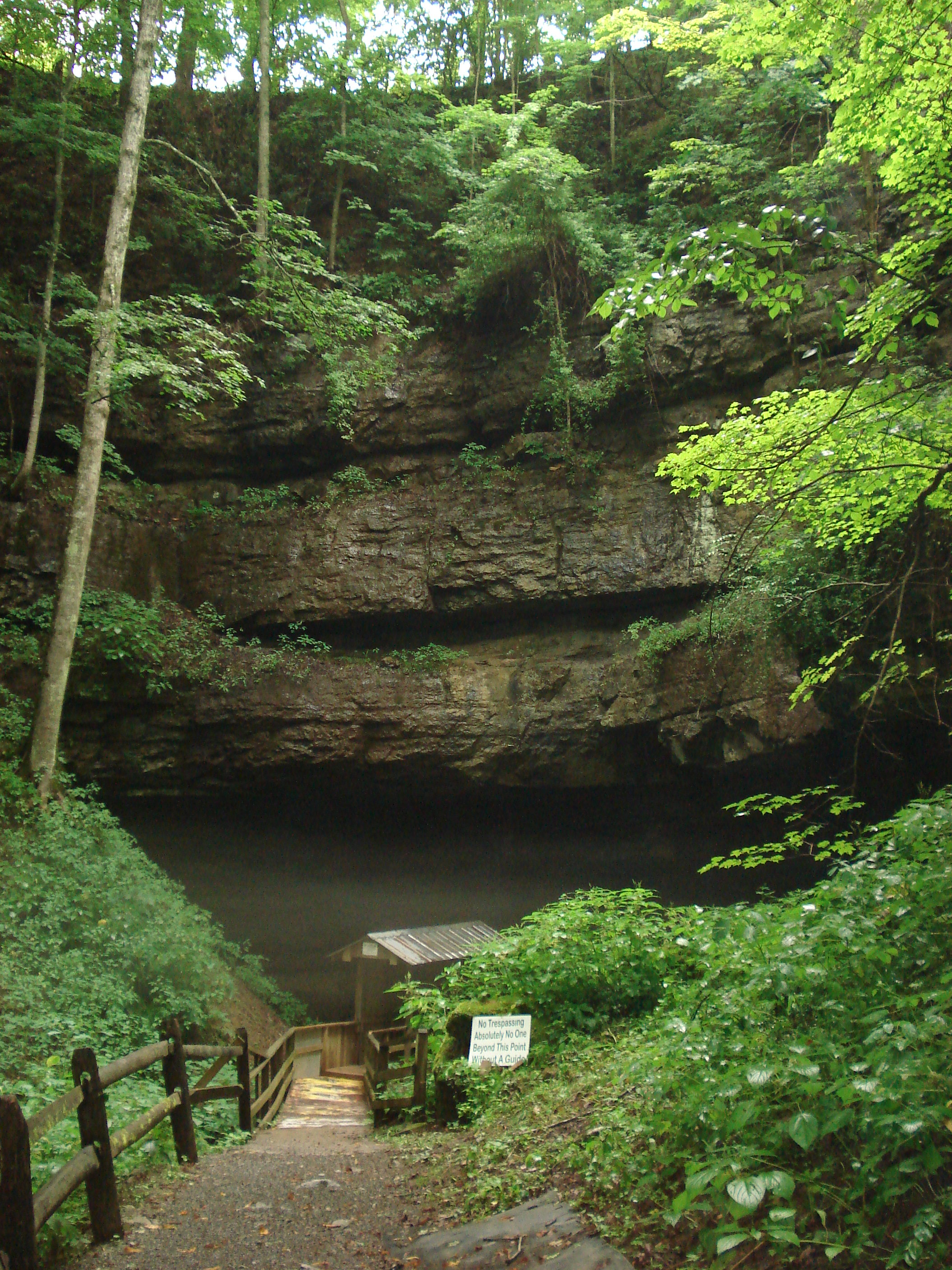
- The main historical (and commercial) entrance to Organ Cave

- Location within West Virginia
- Floor elevation: 2,188 ft (667 m)
- Length: 38.452 miles (61.882 km)

Geography
- Location: United States, West Virginia, Greenbrier
- Coordinates: 37°43′05″N 80°26′13″W
- Interactive map of Organ Cave

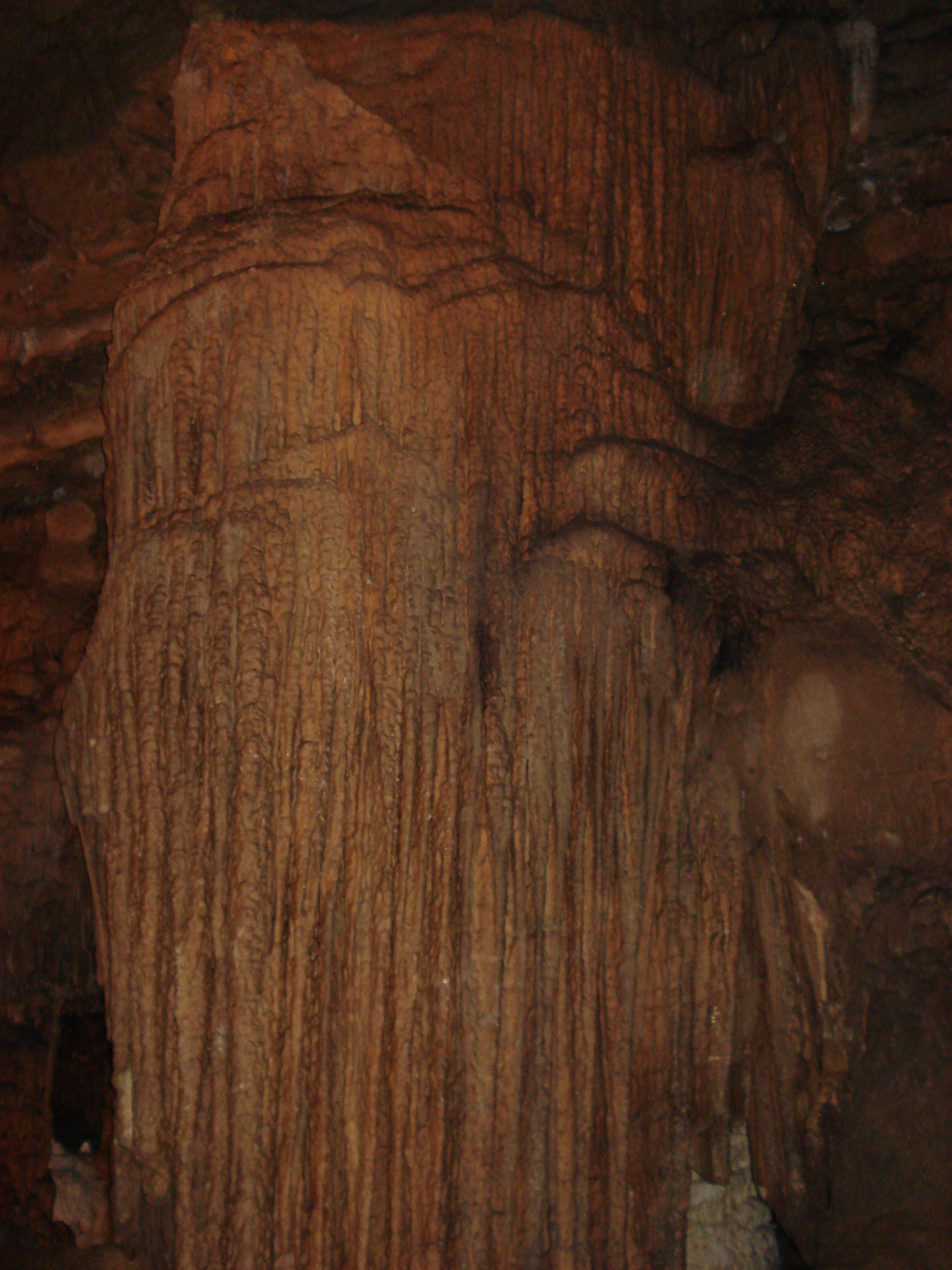
The eponymous "organ" formation in Organ Cave

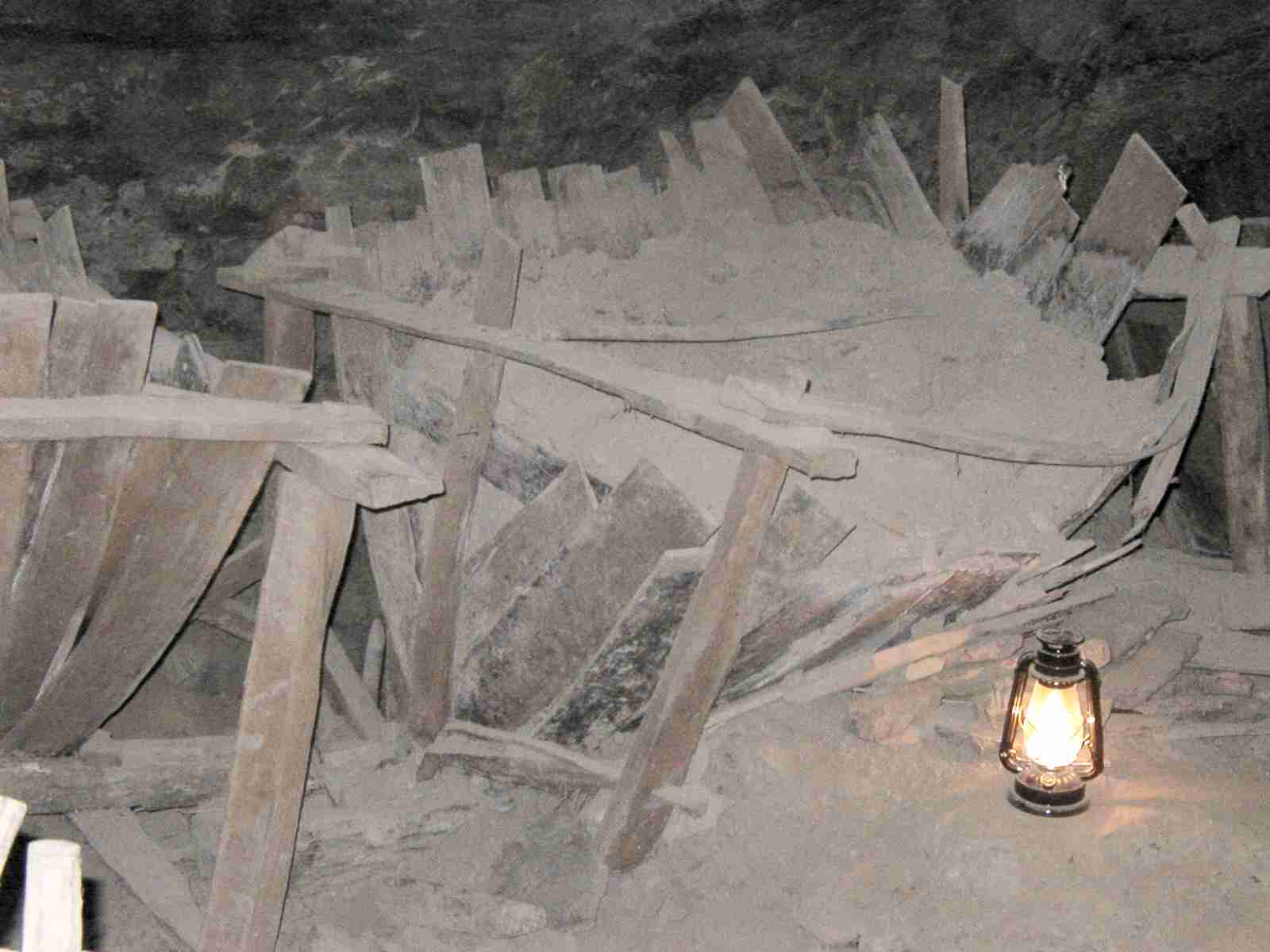
Salt petre vats in Organ Cave

Organ Cave is a large and historic cave in Greenbrier County, West Virginia, USA. The surrounding community takes its name from the cave.

In 1973, the Organ Cave System—also known as the Organ–Hedricks Cave System—was registered as a National Natural Landmark for being "the largest cave system in the State, containing many caves, one of which is Organ Cave. Noted also for its saltpeter troughs and vats." (It is now the third-longest known cave in the state, after the Friars Hole Cave System in the same county and the Hellhole System in Pendleton County.) Organ Cave has also been listed on the National Register of Historic Places since 2005.

== History ==
Significant fossil discoveries bear witness to the early natural history of Organ Cave: giant ground sloth, grizzly bear, nine-banded armadillo, sabre-tooth cat, reindeer and an Ice Age porcupine. Organ Cave's human history is attested by flint arrowheads used by early Native Americans. Evidence of early white settlers in the cave is suggested by the date "1704" scratched on a wall, but this may be a later addition since the first white settlers to Greenbrier County came only in the 1740s.

The cave was used since before 1835 as a source for nitre (saltpeter) for the manufacture of gunpowder. During the American Civil War, Confederate soldiers under the command of General Robert E. Lee again mined the cave for nitre. The cave today has the nation's largest collection of Civil War-era saltpeter hoppers. Studies have shown the cave dirt is high in calcium nitrate, which was turned into potassium nitrate using these hoppers.

Organ Cave was first surveyed by members of the National Speleological Society in July 1948. For many years it was considered the longest cave in the world. As of 11 March 2022, the Organ Cave System had 38.452 miles (61.882 km) of surveyed cave passage making it the 55th longest cave in the world, the 16th longest in the United States, and the 3rd longest in West Virginia.

== Jefferson's ground sloth ==
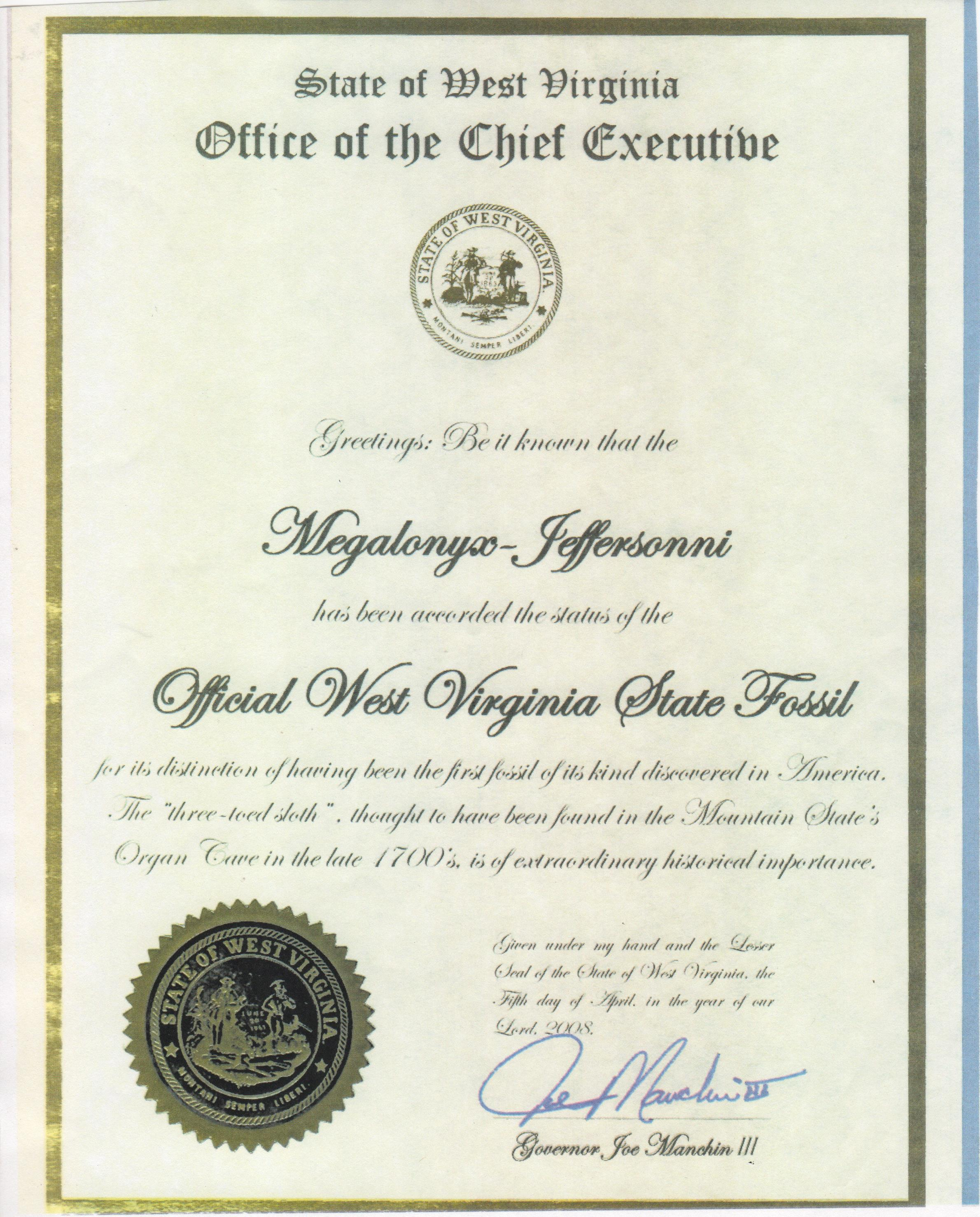
Certificate stating that M. jeffersonii is the "Official West Virginia State Fossil" and was "thought to have been found" in Organ Cave. (It contains the additional error of referring to the "three-toed sloth" rather than Jefferson's giant ground sloth.)

Formerly, a famous fossil discovery—that of Thomas Jefferson's giant ground sloth (Megalonyx jeffersonii)—had been assumed to have come originally from Organ Cave. Jefferson never visited the area, but received the fossil from a local friend in 1796. In the early 20th century, a local man, Andrew Price of Marlinton, decided that the fossil had come from Organ Cave and popularized his theory. In 1995, however, Smithsonian paleontologist Frederick Grady proposed that Haynes Cave in nearby Monroe County was the true source. (His reasons had to do with historical land-ownership records.)

In 2008, the governor of West Virginia held a ceremony at Organ Cave to present the owner with a certificate stating that M. jeffersoni was the "Official West Virginia State Fossil" and repeated the assertion that it was indeed found in Organ Cave, but without producing any new evidence.

== See also ==
- List of National Natural Landmarks
- List of National Natural Landmarks in West Virginia
- List of longest caves in the United States
