= List of fossiliferous stratigraphic units in Vermont =

This article contains a list of fossil-bearing stratigraphic units in the state of Vermont, U.S.

== Sites ==
Group or Formation	Period	Notes
Beekmantown Group/Fort Cassin Formation	Ordovician	
Chazy Formation	Ordovician	
Chazy Group/Valcour Formation	Ordovician	
Chazy Group/Crown Point Formation	Ordovician	
Chazy Group/Day Point Formation	Ordovician	
Chazy Group/Valcour Formation	Ordovician	
Crown Point Formation	Ordovician	
Day Point Formation	Ordovician	
Fort Ann Formation	Ordovician	
Fort Cassin Formation	Ordovician	
Gorge Formation	Cambrian	
Highgate Formation	Ordovician	
Monkton Quartzite	Cambrian	
Parker Slate	Cambrian	
Skeels Corner Slate	Cambrian	
St. Albans Shale	Cambrian	

== See also ==
- Paleontology in Vermont
