= Ceratocara =

Ceratocara Temporal range: Middle Ordovician–Llandovery
- Assorted trilobite remains; all except 26, 27, and 30 belong to Ceratocara

Scientific classification
- Kingdom: Animalia
- Phylum: Arthropoda
- Clade: †Artiopoda
- Class: †Trilobita
- Order: †Odontopleurida
- Family: †Odontopleuridae
- Subfamily: †Ceratocephalinae
- Genus: †Ceratocara; Ramsköld, 1991

Type species
- †Ceratocephala rarispina Whittington, 1956

Species
- † C. argentina Chatterton et al., 1997; † C. rarispina (Whittington, 1956); † C. sexpares (Tripp, 1967); † C. shawi Chatterton et al., 1997; † C. tuberata (Dean, 1974)

Genus of trilobites

Ceratocara is a genus of trilobites. While its first species, Ceratocara rarispina, was described in 1956, it was not recognised as belonging to a new genus until 1991. Several additional species have been identified. It is closely related to the genus Ceratocephala, with which it was historically conflated. Ceratocara may be a paedomorphic relative of Ceratocephala.

Ceratocara was widely distributed by the Middle Ordovician, with a range spanning from the ancient continent Laurentia to the distant Precordillera Terrane. This could indicate that it diverged from Ceratocephala during the Early Ordovician. Sites at which its remains have been found have yielded an array of other trilobite species and other animals.

== History of discovery ==
The type species of Ceratocara, Ceratocara rarispina, was described in 1956 as Ceratocephala rarispina by the palaeontologist Harry B. Whittington. The holotype and other specimens were collected at the Oranda Formation (Note: A 1994 study published by the United States Geological Survey of the geologic formations of Virginia, West Virginia, and Pennsylvania rejects the existence of the Oranda Formation as a defined geologic unit; the authors regard it as a mix of the overlying Martinsburg Formation and underlying Edinburg Formation. Some later authors have continued to use the older name. This article uses Oranda Formation for consistency.) in Virginia, United States. C. rarispina was among several new species of trilobites Whittington described from the formation, which is Middle Ordovician in age.

In 1991, Lars Ramsköld, citing observations made by both Whittington himself and the palaeontologist David L. Bruton about how different C. rarispina was from other members of the genus Ceratocephala, erected the new genus Ceratocara for the species. The genus name comes from the Greek words kerato- (lit. 'horned') and kara (lit. 'head' or 'top') in reference to the spiny nature of one of its lobes. He placed two other species originally assigned to Ceratocephala in Ceratocara — C. sexpares (described by Ronald Pearson Tripp in 1967) and C. tuberata (described by William T. Dean in 1974), as well as an unnamed species originally placed in Selenopeltoides. The species are from the Middle Ordovician of Scotland, the Late Ordovician of Ireland, and the Llandovery Epoch (beginning of the Silurian) of Ontario, Canada, respectively. Ramsköld further wrote that many remains attributed to Ceratocephala triacantheis by Frederick C. Shaw in 1968 (from the Middle Ordovician of New York, United States) should be assigned to Ceratocara instead; Ramsköld described the remains as "similar, but not identical, to C. rarispina".

Brian D. E. Chatterton and colleagues described two new Ceratocara species in 1997: C. argentina and C. shawi. C. argentina was described from "excellently silicified" specimens from the Middle Ordovician Las Aguaditas Formation in San Juan Province, Argentina. The species was named for the country where it was discovered. C. shawi, which was also noted for its well-preserved specimens, was collected from the Middle Ordovician Crown Point Formation. Chatterton and colleagues identified C. shawi with the remains assigned by Shaw (in whose honour the new species was named) to Ceratocephala triacantheis, concurring with Ramsköld's assessment that they belonged to a species of Ceratocara.

== Description ==
Ceratocara rarispina possesses several features that serve to distinguish it and its close relatives from Ceratocephala: some of the lobes on its glabella (a projecting structure atop the trilobite head) are small or absent, it has deep longitudinal and lobe-defining furrows (grooves), narrow fixed cheeks (part of the head of trilobites), its eyes are set posteriorly (towards the back), it has almost no posterior band, its occipital lobe (the rear lobe of the head) is barely visible, its glabella has four pairs of prominent tubercles or spines (and a smaller fifth pair), its fixed cheeks have three prominent tubercles or spines, it has a deep furrow near the border of its cheeks, and it has a short spine in the middle of its pygidium (rear portion). These features are nearly all found in immature or small adult members of Ceratocephala. Ramsköld wrote that Ceratocara is either less derived than Ceratocephala or that it developed its features through paedomorphosis (delayed or slowed development).

Traits that serve to distinguish Ceratocara argentina from C. rarispina include a denser set of spiny tubercles on its cranidium (the part of the head containing the glabella), bulges on its anterior (frontal) margin, shallower furrows on its glabella, denser granules (bumps) along some of the furrows of the head, no furrows diving the central lobe of the glabella, fewer border spines along the edges of the free cheeks (C. rarispina has 17 while C. argentina has "about 15"), a more concave rear edge of its hypostome (a plate covering the mouth), shorter spines on the frontal half of the thorax, a straighter spine on the ninth segment of the thorax, and a slightly shorter pygidium spine. C. shawi, in comparison to C. rarispina, has much shallower furrows on its glabella and the central part of its body, more neatly arranged spiny tubercles on its central glabellar lobe (in C. rarispina, two pairs of spines are far away relative to the others), a much shallower suborbital (region around the eyes) that lacks bordering spiny granules, fewer spines on the edges of the free cheeks and slightly fewer spiny tubercles on their inner ridges, and a slightly shorter pygidium spine with fewer barbs surrounding it. Other distinguishing features of C. shawi include its lobe in the middle of the glabella, which is parallel sided instead of tapering forward, and the absence of major central glabellar spine pairs on swollen lobes.

Chatterton and colleagues collected a number of protaspides (larvae) belonging to Ceratocara argentina. They range from 0.37 millimetres (0.015 in) to 0.44 millimetres (0.017 in) wide and 0.39 millimetres (0.015 in) to 0.48 millimetres (0.019 in) long. There is some variation among specimens; a few appear less mature than others (with fewer spines and less developed furrows and tubercles). Less mature specimens are subcircular and slightly raised dorsally. Their axes are slightly raised and defined by shallow furrows, and further weakly subdivided to form the middle glabellar lobe, occipital lobe, and terminal piece (final segment of the axis). They have various pairs of spines and tubercles across the body, including on the fixed cheeks, the pygidial region, the glabella, and occipital lobe. More mature protaspides have additional pairs of spines on the pygidial region, occipital lobe, and glabella, and they start to show spine pairs on the axial lobes. In size, they mostly overlap with younger protaspides, although two specimens in this developmental range were somewhat larger, measuring up to 0.56 millimetres (0.022 in) long and 0.6 millimetres (0.024 in) wide.

Meraspids (individuals at an intermediate stage in development) of Ceratocara argentina show more developed spines and better defined bodily lobes. Some new spines and tubercles are also present. As with protaspides, there are observable differences in anatomy between more and less mature individuals within the same developmental stage. Fully mature individuals display less obvious changes, but there is moderate expansion of the glabella and fixed cheeks; slightly more thorough development of the pygidial spine; more definition of the eye-ridge and occipital furrows; and more development along the edges of the body.

== Classification ==
Ramsköld assigned Ceratocara to the subfamily Ceratocephalinae of the family Odontopleuridae. Using a branch and bound algorithm, he constructed several cladograms of Odontopleuridae genera, all of which placed Ceratocara and Ceratocephala as sister taxa, which themselves were sister to the nine other members of the ingroup. Those using Diacanthaspis and Boedaspis as outgroups mostly resolved, while others resolved more poorly. He wrote that the consistent placement of Ceratocara and Ceratocephala relative to one another was unsurprising given that their species were all originally assigned to the same genus.

Phylogeny of select Odontopleuridae genera (Ramsköld, 1991)

- Diacanthaspis (outgroup)
- - - Ceratocara
    - Ceratocephala
  - - - Ceratocephalina
    - - - Isoprusia
        - Laethoprusia
      - - - Proceratocephala
        - - - Ceratonurus
            - Miraspis
            - Selenopeltoides
            - - - Dicranurus
                - Selenopeltis

Based on Ramsköld's cladistic work with the genera, Chatterton and colleagues created their own phylogenies for Ceratocara and Ceratocephala. Ceratocephalina was used as an outgroup. The four shortest trees yielded by their analyses were all in agreement with one another regarding the internal relationships of Ceratocara. Using implied weighting, the authors selected a favoured tree of the four and published it as part of their study (C. tuberata and the unnamed species first assigned to Selenopeltoides are not included; they are described in the paper as not closely related to C. argentina and poorly understood).

Phylogeny of Ceratocara and Ceratocephala (Chatterton et al., 1997)

- Ceratocephalina (outgroup)
- - - - Ceratocephala
        - Ceratocephala relativa
        - - Ceratocephala triacantheis
          - - Ceratocephala graffhami
            - Ceratocephala laciniata
      - Ceratocara
        - Ceratocara argentina
        - - Ceratocara shawi
          - - Ceratocara rarispina
            - Ceratocara sexpares

Chatterton and colleagues wrote that an unnamed species of Ceratocephala had been dated to the Arenig of the Early Ordovician (477.7 to 470 million years ago). This makes it significantly older than any of the species included in their analysis. They wrote that there was some independent geologic evidence supporting the idea that Ceratocara and Ceratocephala had diverged by that point.

== Palaeoecology ==
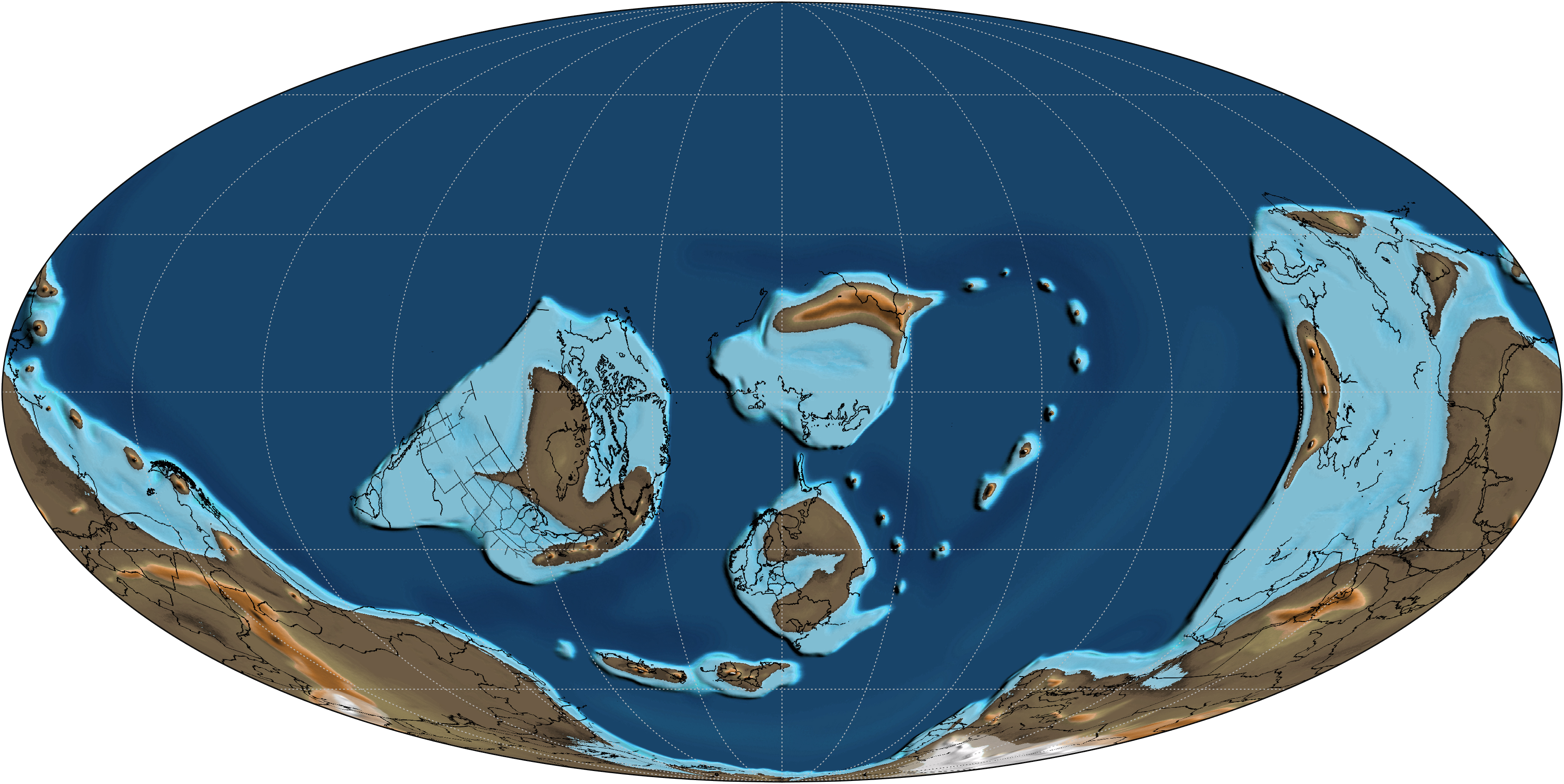
Earth during the Middle Ordovician; the modern-day landmasses of North America and Scotland are joined as parts of Laurentia

Chatterton and colleagues wrote that their study slightly supported the existence of a clade within Ceratocara localised around eastern Laurentia (an ancient continent that would have included what is now Virginia, New York, and Scotland). They stated that this suggests that by the end of the Middle Ordovician, the land that is now Argentina, or the Precordillera Terrane, would have been further from the three Laurentian components than the components would have been from each other. However, the presence of Ceratocara in all four areas and the lack of records of it from other regions suggests either the four regions were in close proximity or there was some mechanism aiding in biological dispersal between them. They wrote that Ceratocara is a benthic genus whose protaspides are not pelagic and that it is doubtful that any earlier larval stage without an exoskeleton would have stayed in this stage long enough for a dispersal. Furthermore, other authors had already predicted that the Precordillera Terrane would not have been particularly close to Laurentia by this time. Chatterton and colleagues concluded that assuming both facts about larval development and continent orientation are correct, the genus's history goes back to the Early Ordovician when the two regions would have been much closer together. The discovery of older species from the Precordillera Terrane would support this hypothesis.

Whittington wrote that Ceratocara rarispina was rare compared to other species found at the Oranda Formation, with only 7 cranidia recovered in total (Diacanthaspis orandensis, for instance, had 120 records). The Oranda Formation and other sites of similar age in the Shenandoah Valley in Virginia are known for their well preserved trilobite fossils representing a variety of species. The Las Aguaditas Formation, in addition to trilobites has yielded remains of conodonts, brachiopods, bryozoans, gastropods, and crinoids. The Chazy Group, which includes the Crown Point Formation, is known for its preserved reefs dominated by sponges of the clade Stromatoporoidea.

== See also ==
- List of trilobite genera
