= Valcour =

Valcour may refer to:

- Aline and Valcour, novel
- USS Valcour, ship
- Valcour Aime (1797–1867), American businessman
- Valcour Bay, strait
- Valcour Formation, geologic formation
- Valcour Island, island in New York
- Valcour Records, record label

== See also ==
- Valcourt (disambiguation)
