= Parablackwelderia =

Parablackwelderia Temporal range: Dresbachian

Scientific classification
- Kingdom: Animalia
- Phylum: Arthropoda
- Clade: †Artiopoda
- Class: †Trilobita
- Order: †Odontopleurida
- Family: †Damesellidae
- Genus: †Parablackwelderia; Kobayashi, 1942

Extinct arthropod genus

Parablackwelderia is an extinct genus from a well-known class of fossil marine arthropods, the trilobites. It lived from 501 to 490 million years ago during the Dresbachian faunal stage of the late Cambrian Period.
