= Orphanaspis =

Orphanaspis Temporal range: Late Ordovician–Devonian

Scientific classification
- Kingdom: Animalia
- Phylum: Arthropoda
- Clade: †Artiopoda
- Class: †Trilobita
- Order: †Odontopleurida
- Family: †Odontopleuridae
- Genus: †Orphanaspis; Prantl & Pribyl, 1949

Type species
- Trilobites orphana Barrande, 1852

Species
- Orphanaspis erbeni (Pillet, 1972); Orphanaspis orphana (Barrande, 1852); Orphanaspis gracilicauda Erben, 1952

Genus of trilobites

Orphanaspis is a poorly known genus of odontopleurid trilobite in the family Odontopleuridae. The genus is originally based on poorly preserved material from the Wenlock-aged Motol Formation in Bohemia, Czech Republic, described by Joachim Barrande, in 1852, as "Trilobites orphana." In 1945, Prantl and Pribyl reclassify T. orphana as Orphanaspis orphana. Some experts suspect that O. orphana may actually be a species of Dicranurus.
