= St. Albans Shale =

Cambrian rock formation in Vermont

- Stratigraphic range: Cambrian
- Type: Formation

Location
- Region: Vermont
- Country: United States

The St. Albans Shale is a geologic formation in Vermont. It preserves fossils dating back to the Cambrian period.

== See also ==
- List of fossiliferous stratigraphic units in Vermont
- Paleontology in Vermont
