= Highgate Formation =

Geologic formation in Vermont, U.S.

- Stratigraphic range: Ordovician
- Type: Formation

Location
- Region: Vermont
- Country: United States

The Highgate Formation is a geologic formation in Vermont. It preserves fossils dating back to the Ordovician period.

== See also ==
- List of fossiliferous stratigraphic units in Vermont
- Paleontology in Vermont
