= Monkton Quartzite =

Geological Formation in Vermont, USA

- Stratigraphic range: Cambrian
- Type: Formation

Location
- Region: Vermont
- Country: United States

The Monkton Quartzite is a geologic formation in Vermont. It preserves fossils dating back to the middle of the Cambrian period.

== Geology ==
The Monkton Quartzite consists of red ferruginous quartzite interbedded with lesser buff and white quartzites. Additionally, there are thick sections of dolomite (dolomstone) containing algal laminations similar to the Winooski Dolostone. The Monkton Quartzite preserves many primary sedimentary features, including wave-action ripples, rain-drop imprints, trilobite tracks, and burrows. The unit contains shallowing upward cycles of subtidal sand shoals overlain by intertidal beds of sand and silt. This shows a prograding tidal flat during a time of clastic deposition on the passive margin of Laurentia. Below the erosionally-resistant rocks of the Monkton lies the Dunham Dolostone, and above lies the Winooski Dolostone. The Monkton Quartzite is well exposed at the Redstone Quarry in South Burlington Vermont. Here, the Monkton Quartzites have been thrust to the west by the Champlain Thrust.

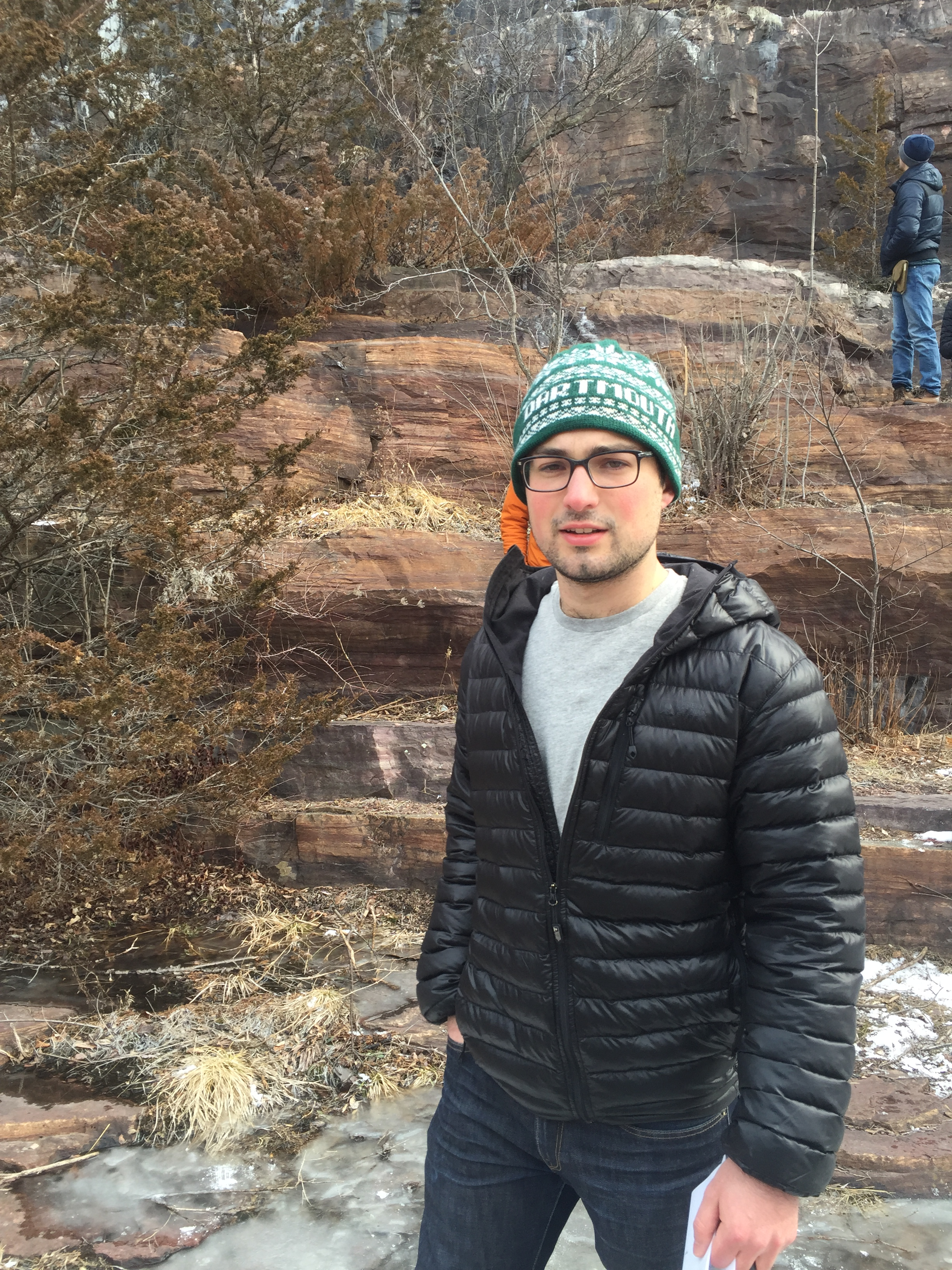
Geology student in front of Monkton Formation outside of Burlington, Vermont.

== See also ==
- List of fossiliferous stratigraphic units in Vermont
- Paleontology in Vermont
