= Valcour Island =

Island in Clinton County, New York, United States

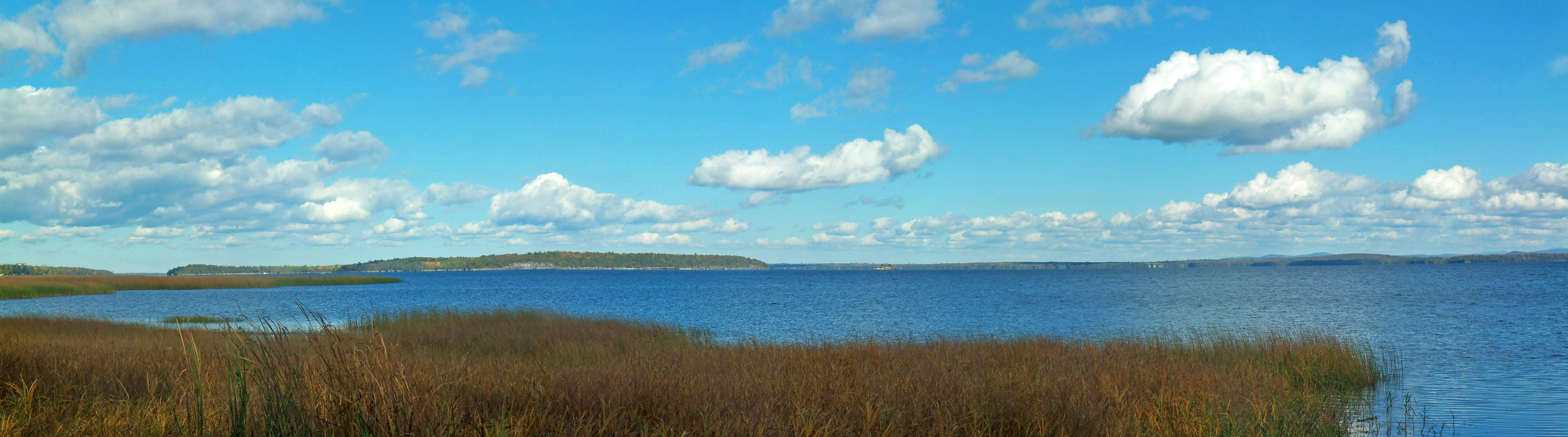
- Valcour Island

- Location within New York

Geography
- Location: Lake Champlain
- Coordinates: 44°37′18″N 73°25′02″W
- Area: 968 acres (392 ha)
- Length: 2 mi (3 km)
- Width: 1 mi (2 km)
- Highest elevation: 148 ft (45.1 m)

Administration
- United States
- State: New York
- County: Clinton
- Towns: Peru, Plattsburgh
- Owner: New York State Department of Environmental Conservation

Valcour Island is the fourth-largest island located in Lake Champlain in Clinton County, New York, United States. It lies by the western shore of Lake Champlain, forming one side of a narrow strait against the mainland of New York. It has an area of 968-acre (3.92 km^{2}) being about two miles (3.2 km) long and one mile (1.6 km) wide.

The island is mostly in the Town of Peru and partly in the Town of Plattsburgh, southeast of the City of Plattsburgh. It is within the boundaries of the Adirondack Park.

== Description ==
Valcour Island is the fourth-largest island in Lake Champlain with the island being about two miles (3.2 km) long and one mile (1.6 km) wide. The only three islands that are larger are the Grand Isle, North Hero and Isle la Motte, all part of Vermont.

Its shores are alternately rocky, craggy outcroppings and sandy beaches. Several protected bays provide anchorages.

== Geology ==
The island contains three formation from the Ordovician period; the Chazy Reef Formation, Crown Point Formation and the Valcour Formation.

=== Chazy Reef Formation ===
The island contains part of the Chazy Reef Formation, a limestone deposition that has been dated to the Middle Ordovician period. The island perhaps contains the best section of the formation and has been intensively studied. This formation represents the oldest known occurrence of a biologically diverse fossil reef in the world and the earliest appearance of fossil coral in a reef environment. It is also the first documented example of the ecological principle of faunal succession.

The reef was dedicated as part of the Chazy Fossil Reef National Natural Landmark in 2009.

=== Crown Point Formation ===
The Crown Point Formation has been dated to the Late Ordovician period. It is a high-diversity formation that is dominated by both beyrichiocopids and podocopids. It contains many ostracods, around 42 genera, such as Aviacypris, Eokloedenella and Vogdesella.

=== Valcour Formation ===
The Valcour Formation has been dated to the Ordovician period. This formation is characterized by the return of calcarenites that are interspersed with limestones. This formation contains many calcareous algae, stromatoporoids, sponges, corals, bryozoans, trilobites, brachiopods, cephalopods, ostracods and echinoderms.

== History ==
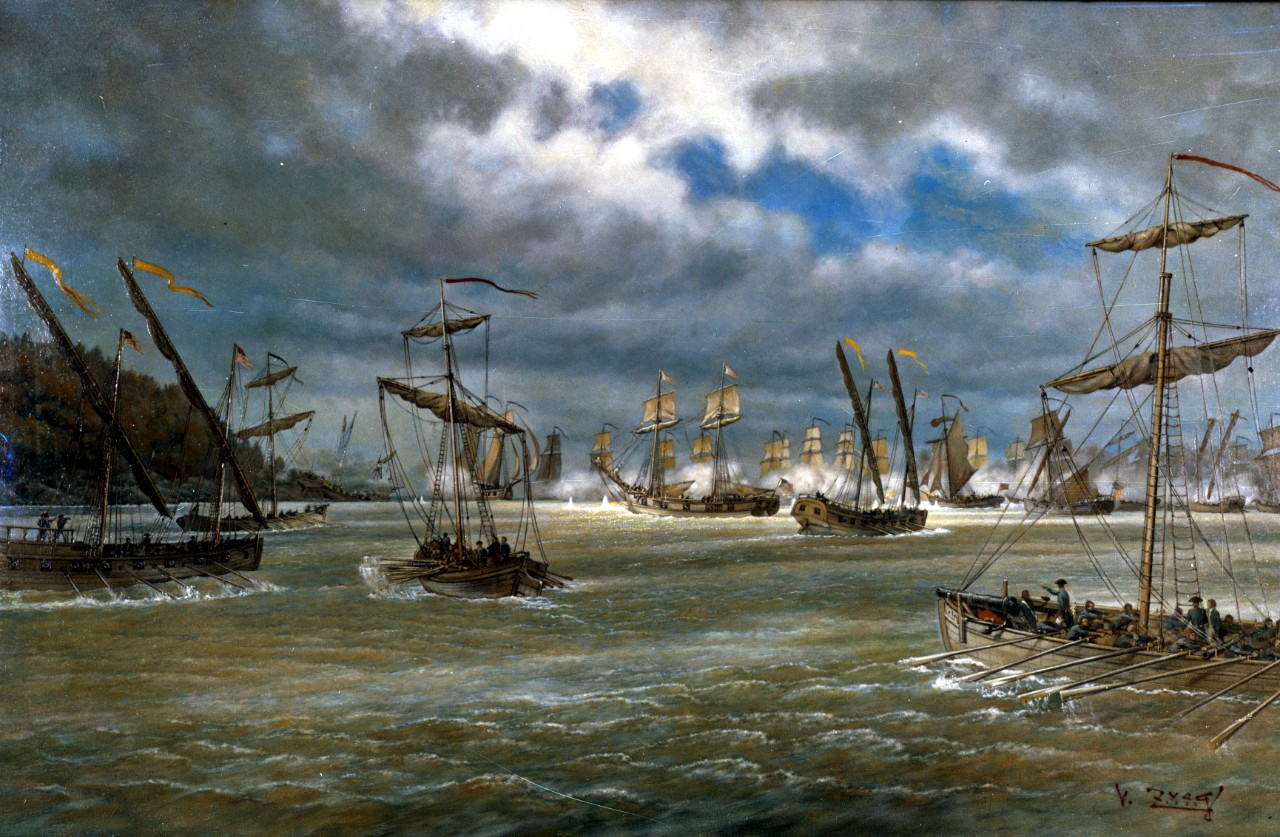
Battle of Valcour Island

A naval engagement known as the Battle of Valcour Island began on the 11th of October, 1776. The battle was between the Kingdom of Great Britain and the Thirteen Colonies under Brigadier General Benedict Arnold during the American Revolutionary War. The battle was fought in the strait adjacent to the island. While diving near Indian Point, Edwin Scollon, a New York State Police officer and a member of the New York State Underwater Recovery Team, had discovered part of a cannon that was aboard one of the American gunboats. After twenty-seven years of this initial discovery, on 2026, another piece of the same cannon was recovered.

Starting in 1871, the Bluff Point Light stood on the western shores of Valcour Island guiding ships through the narrow strait. The lighthouse had done this until 1930 where it was replaced by a steel tower.

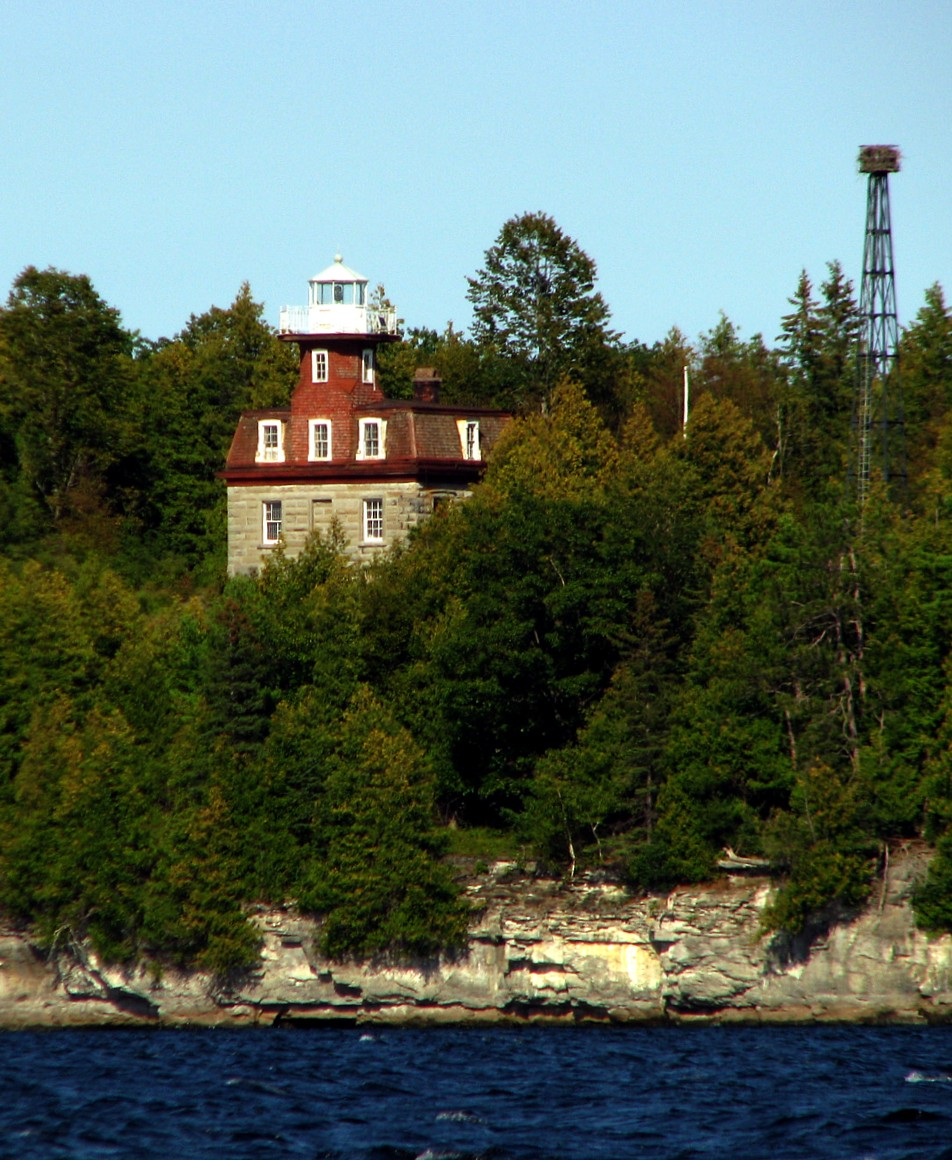
Bluff Point Light on Valcour Island. The steel tower at right held the light from 1930 to 2002. In this photo, it holds an Osprey (Pandion haliaetus) nest.

Valcour was the site of several farms and summer homes and one short-lived utopian community, the Dawn Valcour Society from the nineteenth century until the 1970s, when New York State completed its purchase of the island. The island is now within the Adirondack Park, and is managed by the New York State Department of Environmental Conservation as the "Valcour Island Primitive Area".
