= Dipentaspis =

Dipentaspis Temporal range: Cambrian

Scientific classification
- Kingdom: Animalia
- Phylum: Arthropoda
- Clade: †Artiopoda
- Class: †Trilobita
- Order: †Odontopleurida
- Family: †Damesellidae
- Genus: †Dipentaspis; Öpik, 1967

Dipentaspis is an extinct genus of damesellid odontopleurid trilobite. It lived during the Cambrian Period, which lasted from approximately 539 to 485 million years ago.
