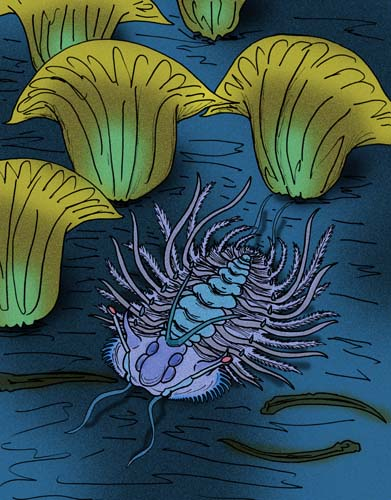
- Artist's reconstruction

Scientific classification
- Domain: Eukaryota
- Kingdom: Animalia
- Phylum: Arthropoda
- Class: †Trilobita
- Order: †Odontopleurida
- Family: †Odontopleuridae
- Genus: †Miraspis; Richter & Richter, 1917

Type species
- Odontopleura mira Barrande, 1846

= Miraspis =

Miraspis Temporal range: Wenlock

Extinct genus of trilobites

Miraspis mira is a spinose species of odontopleurid trilobite in the family Odontopleuridae. Fossils of M. mira are known from the Wenlock-aged Liteň Formation in Loděnice, in Bohemia, Czech Republic, originally described by Joachim Barrande, in 1846, as "Odontopleura mira." In 1917, Richter and Richter split "O. mira" off into its own genus, Miraspis.

The spines of M. mira are either smooth, or are fringed with smaller spines. M. mira is notable among odontopleurids in that the living animals had compound eyes set upon tall eyestalks (these eyestalks are often broken off in many, if not most specimens). M. mira also coexisted with its close relative, Odontopleura ovalis.
