= Histiomona =

Histiomona Temporal range: Dresbachian

Scientific classification
- Kingdom: Animalia
- Phylum: Arthropoda
- Clade: †Artiopoda
- Class: †Trilobita
- Order: †Odontopleurida
- Family: †Damesellidae
- Genus: †Histiomona; Öpik, 1967

Histiomona is an extinct genus of damesellid odontopleurid trilobite. It lived from 501 to 490 million years ago during the Dresbachian faunal stage of the late Cambrian Period.
