= Bluff Point Light =

Bluff Point Lighthouse
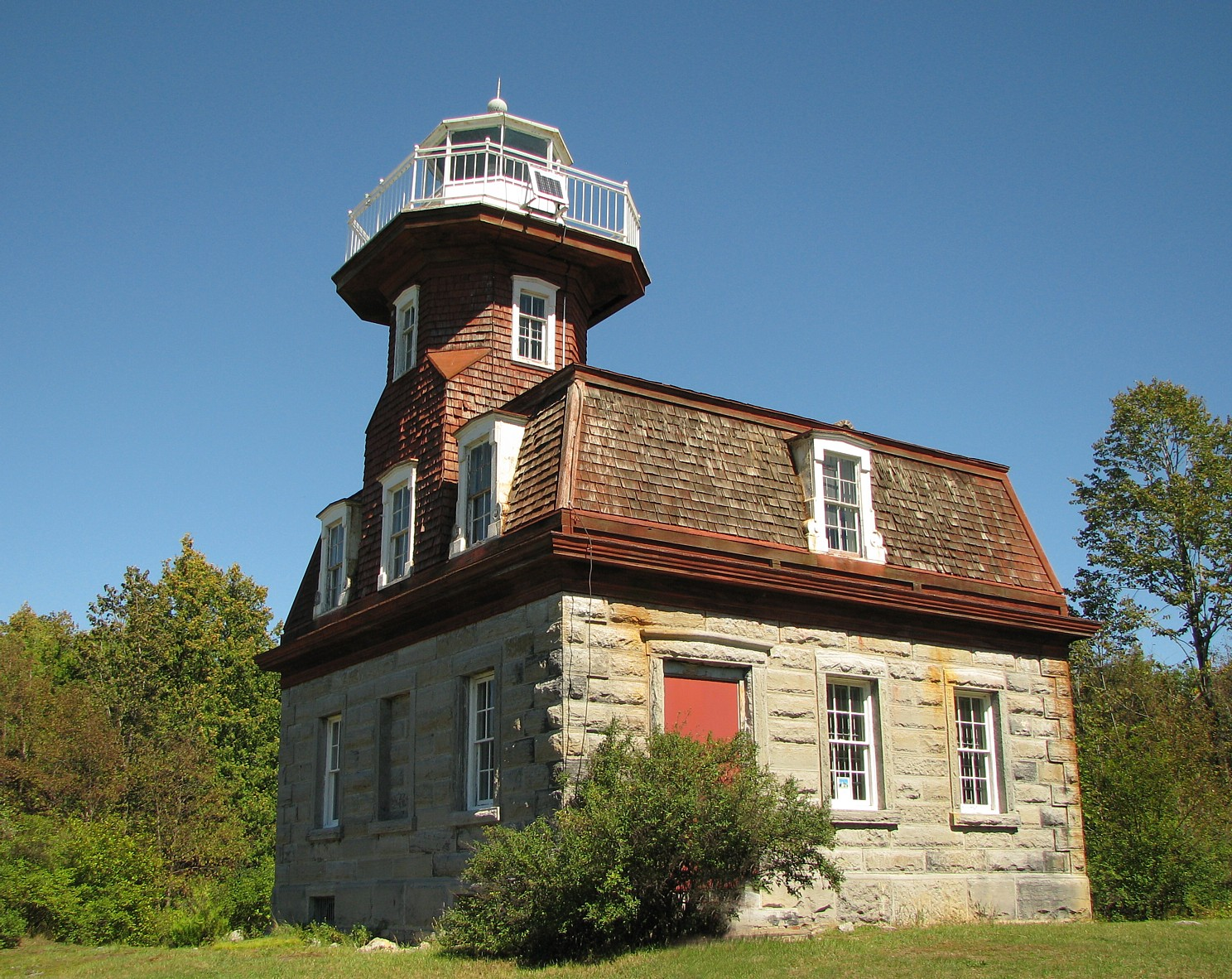
- Bluff Point Light
- Location: Valcour Island, New York
- Coordinates: 44°37′22″N 73°25′52″W

Tower
- Constructed: 1874
- Foundation: Dressed Stone/Timber
- Construction: Blue limestone / Wood
- Automated: 1930
- Height: 35 feet (11 m)
- Shape: Octagonal on Square House
- Markings: Red/White Tower on Square House
- Heritage: National Register of Historic Places listed place

Light
- First lit: 1874
- Deactivated: 1930-2004
- Focal height: 95 feet (29 m)
- Lens: Fifth Order Fresnel lens (original), 12 inches (300 mm) (current)
- Range: 7 nautical miles (13 km; 8.1 mi)
- Characteristic: Flashing White 4s
- Bluff Point Light
- U.S. National Register of Historic Places
- Architectural style: Italianate
- NRHP reference No.: 93000873
- Added to NRHP: 1993

Bluff Point Light, also known as the Valcour Island Light, on Valcour Island in Lake Champlain was in service from its construction in 1874 until 1930 and was one of the last lighthouses on Lake Champlain to be named. It is now part of Adirondack State Park and operated as a museum by the Clinton County Historical Association, an affiliate of the Adirondack Coast Cultural Alliance (ACCA).

Bluff Point Light, for which the United States Congress approved $15,000 in funding in 1870, with a base of blue limestone, stands more than 90 feet (27 m) above the shore. The grounds also include a wooden shed (which has since collapsed and was removed), a cistern and a privy. For almost sixty years, the Victorian style lighthouse and its fifth order Fresnel lens guided ships through the channel between Valcour Island and New York State. As was the case with many other lighthouses, the lighthouse keeper for Bluff Point Light was a disabled Civil War veteran, Major William Herwerth, who worked at the lighthouse from 1876 until 1881 when he died while on duty. In an unusual position for a woman at that time, Herwerth's wife Mary was given command of the lighthouse, which she maintained until 1902.

In 1930, the lighthouse ceased operation when a steel tower with an automated light was built to the south of the lighthouse, rendering the lighthouse obsolete. The lighthouse remained unlit until 2002 when the United States Coast Guard lit it in August 2002, although it was not officially put back into service until 2004.

After the lighthouse was taken out of service, it was purchased by Doctor Otto Raboff from Massachusetts who renovated and used it as a summer house with his family. In the 1980s, the lighthouse became a part of Adirondack State Park and the New York State Department of Environmental Conservation has held the deed to the house since 1986 and pays for all maintenance. Since that time, the Clinton County Historical Association worked to restore the lighthouse and preserve it as a museum. In 1999, the Association was given an award by Adirondack Architectural Heritage for their stewardship of the lighthouse.
