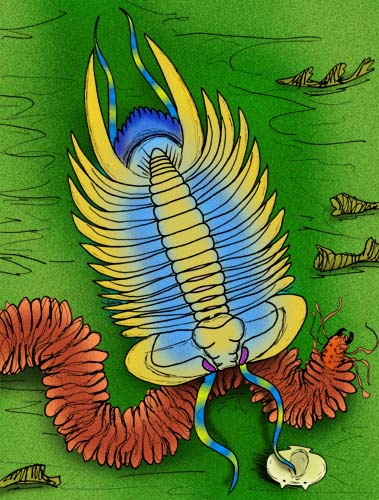
- Neodrepanura premesnili

Scientific classification
- Kingdom: Animalia
- Phylum: Arthropoda
- Clade: †Artiopoda
- Class: †Trilobita
- Order: †Odontopleurida
- Family: †Damesellidae
- Genus: †Neodrepanura; Özdikmen, 2006

Type species
- Drepanura premesnili Bergeron, 1899

Species
- N. crassispina Peng et al. 2004; N. ketteleri Woodward 1905; N. premesnili (Bergeron, 1899); N. transversa Chu 1959

Synonyms
- Drepanura

= Neodrepanura =

Neodrepanura Temporal range: Guzhangian

Extinct genus of trilobites

Neodrepanura is an extinct genus of damesellid odontopleurid trilobite.

== Taxonomy ==
Species of Neodrepanura are better known under the older synonym, Drepanura: the genus was renamed as Neodrepanura in 2006 by Özdikmen when "Drepanura" was discovered to be preoccupied by a springtail described by Schoett 1891.

== Fossil record ==
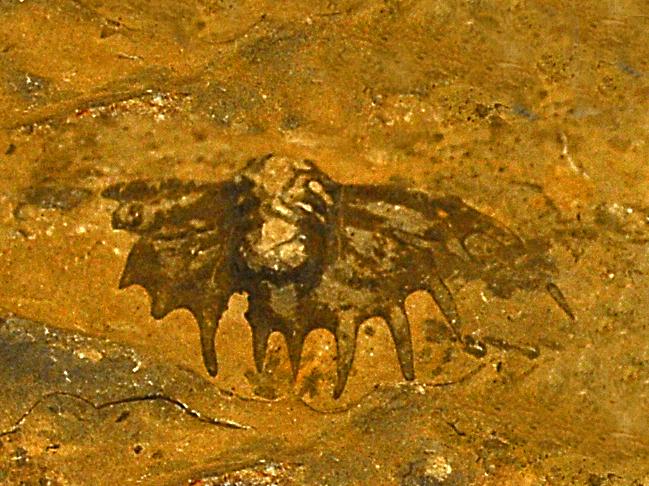
Fossil pygidium of Neodrepanura premesnili

The various species of Neodrepanura are known from numerous, mostly disarticulated fossils found in Late Cambrian-aged marine limestones of Eastern and Southeastern Asia, especially of Northern China. The genus ranged from about 501 to 497 million years ago during the Guzhangian faunal stage of the late Cambrian Period.

== Description ==
The pygidia, particularly those of N. premesnili, are mined by the Chinese for use as "bat stones" or "swallow stones," as good luck charms and traditional medicines. In 2011, the first intact specimen of N. premensnili was found in the Kushan Formation, enabling researchers to better examine the external anatomy of the genus.
