= Blackwelderioides =

Blackwelderioides Temporal range: Dresbachian

Scientific classification
- Kingdom: Animalia
- Phylum: Arthropoda
- Clade: †Artiopoda
- Class: †Trilobita
- Order: †Odontopleurida
- Family: †Damesellidae
- Genus: †Blackwelderioides; Hupé, 1955

Extinct genus of Trilobite

Blackwelderioides is an extinct genus of damesellid odontopleurid trilobite. It lived from 501 to 490 million years ago during the Dresbachian faunal stage of the late Cambrian Period.
