= Cyrtoprora =

Cyrtoprora Temporal range: Dresbachian

Scientific classification
- Kingdom: Animalia
- Phylum: Arthropoda
- Clade: †Artiopoda
- Class: †Trilobita
- Order: †Odontopleurida
- Family: †Damesellidae
- Genus: †Cyrtoprora; Öpik, 1967

Genus of trilobites

Cyrtoprora is an extinct genus of damesellid odontopleurid trilobite. It lived from 501 to 490 million years ago during the Dresbachian faunal stage of the late Cambrian Period.
