= Adelogonus =

Adelogonus Temporal range: Dresbachian

Scientific classification
- Kingdom: Animalia
- Phylum: Arthropoda
- Clade: †Artiopoda
- Class: †Trilobita
- Order: †Odontopleurida
- Family: †Damesellidae
- Genus: †Adelogonus

Extinct genus of trilobite

Adelogonus is an extinct genus of damesellid odontopleurid trilobite. It lived from 501 to 490 million years ago during the Dresbachian faunal stage of the late Cambrian Period. Adelogonus pritchardi was found in 2018 by Smith, Patterson, and Brock at the Goyder Formation, Amadeus Basin, Central Australia. Adelogonus solus was discovered in 1967 by Öpik from the O’Hara Shale in the Georgina Basin. Adelogonus hunanensis was discovered by Babcock, Peng, and Lin in 2013 in the Guzhangian Huaqiao Formation in the Hunan Province, South China. And Adelogonus oblongus discovered in 2013 by Lin, Peng, and Yang.

== Etymology ==
Adelogonus pritchardi was named after C.E Prichard for his work on the Goyder formation, he was the one that coined its name.
