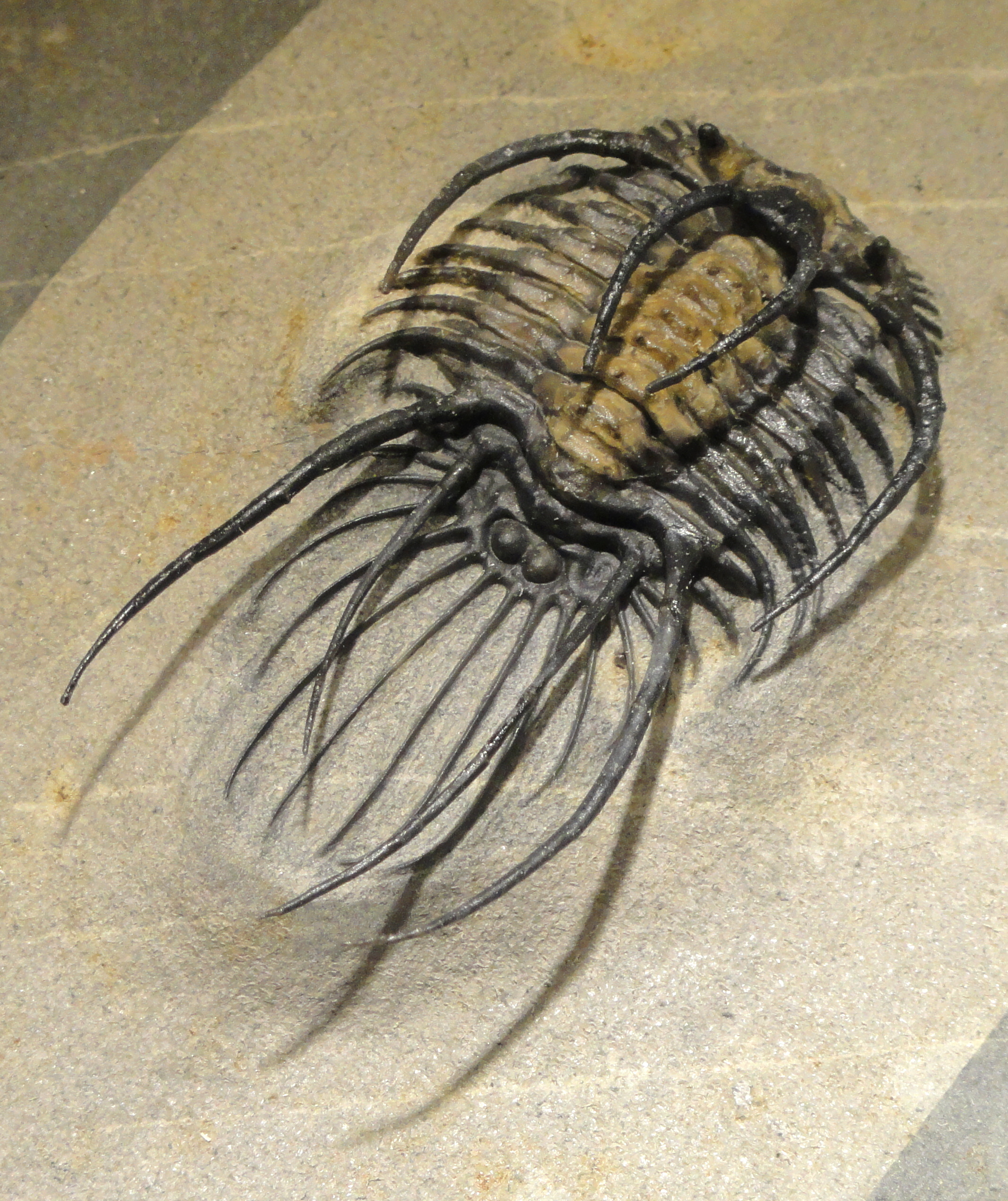

Scientific classification
- Kingdom: Animalia
- Phylum: Arthropoda
- Clade: †Artiopoda
- Class: †Trilobita
- Order: †Odontopleurida
- Family: †Odontopleuridae
- Subfamily: †Odontopleurinae
- Genus: †Radiaspis; Richter and Richter 1917

Type species
- Arges radiatus Goldfuss, 1843

= Radiaspis =

Radiaspis Temporal range: Upper Ordovician to Early Givetian

Genus of trilobite

Radiaspis is a genus of trilobite that lived from Late Ordovician through the Silurian to the mid-Devonian period. Fossils of Radiaspis have been found in present-day Europe, Australia, North Africa, and North America.

== Fossil range ==
Radiaspis is a "generally rare" species found from the Ordovician to Devonian periods. Radiaspis fossils have been discovered in Australia, western Europe, North America, and Morocco. Some of the earliest Radiaspis fossils – Radiaspis tuberata from Aragon – date from the early Late Ordovician, around 445 million years ago. Some of the youngest fossils date to around 386 million years ago, in the lower Givetian; it is believed that the genus Radiaspis and several other trilobite genera became extinct at the time of the Taghanic event.

== Species ==
- Radiaspis comes (Basse, 1998)
- Radiaspis radiata Bruton, 1968
- Radiaspis taghonorum Van Viersen and Magrean 2019

== Bibliography ==
- Allart van Viersen and Benedict Magrean, 2019. "Radiaspis taghonorum sp. nov. (Trilobita, Odontopleuridae) from the Middle Devonian Hanonet Formation in Resteigne, southern Belgium": PDF. Published in Neues Jahrbuch für Geologie und Paläontologie – Abhandlungen volume 293, issue 3. doi:10.1127/njgpa/2019/0841.
- Allart van Viersen and Benedict Magrean, 2005. "A revision of Devonian trilobites from Belgium – Part 1: The genera Cornuproetus and Radiaspis: PDF. Published in Bulletin de l'Institut Royal des Sciences Naturelles de Belgique, Sciences de la Terre volume 75, by the Royal Belgian Institute of Natural Sciences.
- Raimund Feist and Kenneth J. McNamara, 2007. "Biodiversity, distribution and patterns of extinction of the last odontopleuroid trilobites during the Devonian (Givetian, Frasnian)": PDF. Published in Geological Magazine volume 144, issue 5, by Cambridge University Press. doi:10.1017/S0016756807003779; ISSN 1469-5081; CORE 28460018.
