= Valcourt =

Valcourt may refer to:

== Places ==
- Valcourt (city), a city in Quebec, Canada
- Valcourt (township), surrounding the city of Valcourt
- Valcourt, Haute-Marne, a commune in the Haute-Marne department, France

== People ==
- Bernard Valcourt (born 1952), Canadian politician and lawyer
- David P. Valcourt (born 1951), United States Army general

== See also ==
- Valcour (disambiguation)
