= Dudleyaspis =

Dudleyaspis Temporal range: Middle Silurian-Late Devonian, Homerian–Frasnian

Scientific classification
- Domain: Eukaryota
- Kingdom: Animalia
- Phylum: Arthropoda
- Class: †Trilobita
- Order: †Odontopleurida
- Family: †Odontopleuridae
- Genus: †Dudleyaspis; Prantl & Pribyl, 1949

Species
- †Dudleyaspis (Dudleyaspis) hamrensis Ramsköld, 1984; †Dudleyaspis (Snoderaspis) quinquespinosa Campbell, 1967 (Lake, 1896); †Dudleyaspis (Dudleyaspis) uncifera Ramsköld, 1984; †Dudleyaspis (Dudleyaspis) uncifera Ramsköld, 1984

Genus of trilobites

Dudleyaspis (meaning "Dudley shield") is an extinct genus of Lower to Middle Devonian odontopleurid trilobites that lived in a shallow sea that lay between Euramerica and Gondwana. It was named in 1949 by Prantl & Pribyl.

Fossils of Dudleyaspis have been found in the following locations:

- Australia: Bathurst (Jesse Limestone), Mudgee (Flirtation Hill) and Murrumbateman (Black Bog Formation – Yarwood Siltstone Member)
- Canada: Northwest Territories (Mackenzie Mountains – Delorme and Whittaker Formations) and Nunavut (Bailie-Hamilton and Cornwallis Islands – Cape Phillips Formation)
- Czech Republic: Prague (Loc. 5.2 – C. colonus Zone)
- England: Cannock (Shelve District) and Dudley (Wren's Nest – Much Wenlock Limestone Formation)
- France: Coumiac (Coumiac quarry – Coumiac Formation)
- Sweden: western Gotland (Visby – Rönnklint sea cliff and Kättelviken)
- United States: Illinois (Chicago – Racine Dolomite and Kankakee – Racine Dolomite), Iowa (Hopkinton Dolomite), Oklahoma (Anadarko – Henryhouse Formation) and Wisconsin (Milwaukee – Racine Dolomite)
