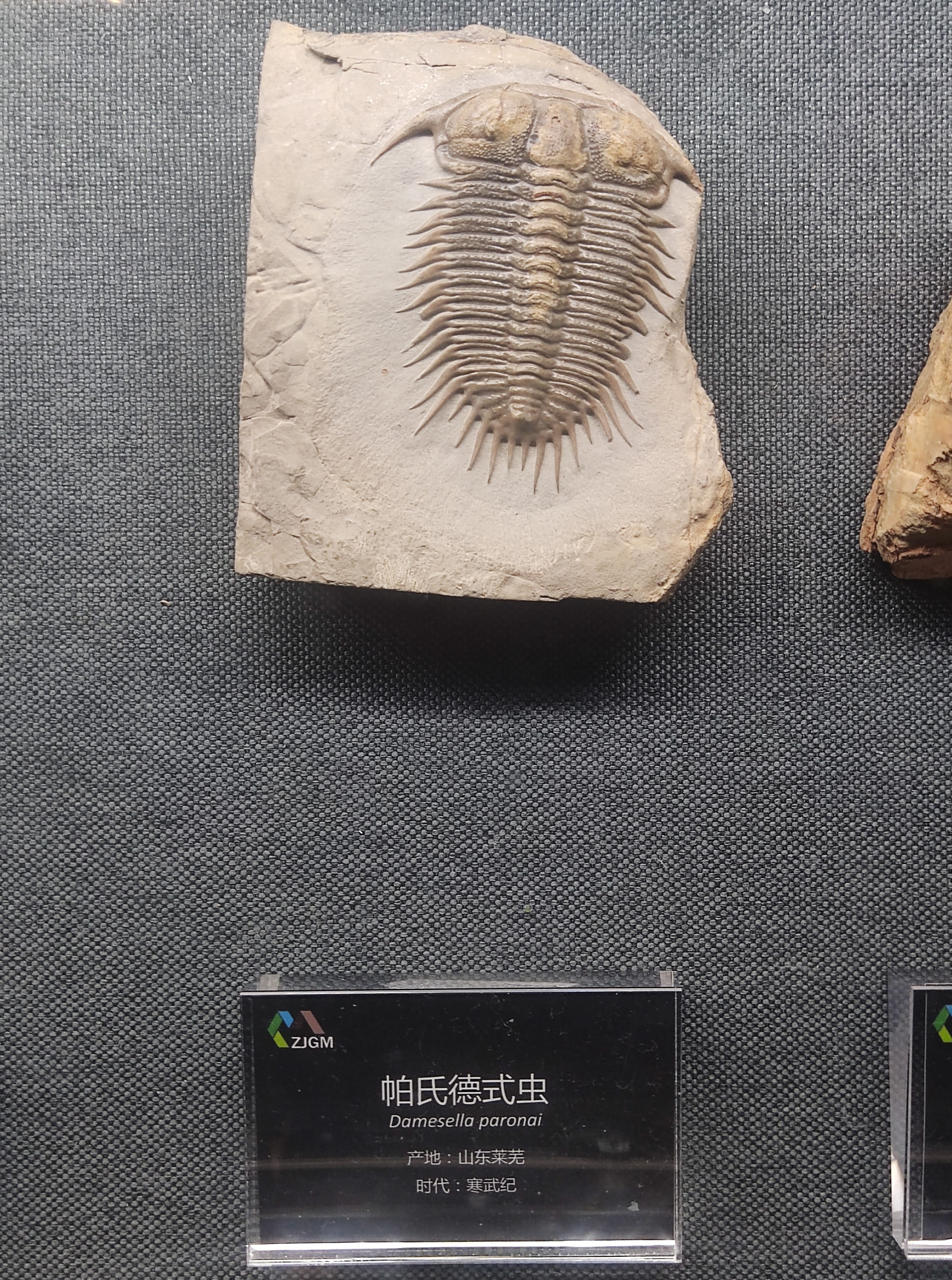
- Damesella paronai

Scientific classification
- Kingdom: Animalia
- Phylum: Arthropoda
- Clade: †Artiopoda
- Class: †Trilobita
- Order: †Odontopleurida
- Family: †Damesellidae; Kobayashi, 1935

Genera
- See text

Synonyms
- Drepanuridae; Kaolishaniidae

= Damesellidae =

Damesellidae Temporal range: Middle Cambrian-Furongian

Family of odontopleurid trilobites

Damesellidae is a family of odontopleurid trilobites found in late Middle to Late Cambrian marine strata, primarily of China. Damesellids are closely related to the odontopleurids of Odontopleuridae, but are not nearly as spinose, nor possess spines as exaggerated as Odontopleuridae. Like Odontopleuridae odontopleurids, damesellids have broad, bar-shaped cranidia with ledge-like borders. Damesellidae may represent transitional forms between more primitive, possibly ancestral ptychopariids and more advanced odontopleurids.

== Genera ==
Genera include

- ?Adelogonus
- Bergeronites
- Blackwelderia
- Blackwelderioides
- Chiawangella
- Cyrtoprora
- Damesella
- Damesops
- Dipentaspis
- Dipyrgotes
- Duamsannella
- Fengduia
- Guancenshania
- ?Hercantyx
- Histiomona
- Jiawangaspis
- Karslanus
- Liuheaspis
- Metashantungia
- Neodamesella
- Neodrepanura
- Palaeadotes,
- Paradamesella
- Parashantungia
- Pingquania
- Pionaspis
- Protaitzehoia
- Pseudoblackwelderia
- Shantungia
- Stephanocare
- Taihangshania
- Taitzehoia
- Teinistion
- Xintaia
- Yanshanopyge
