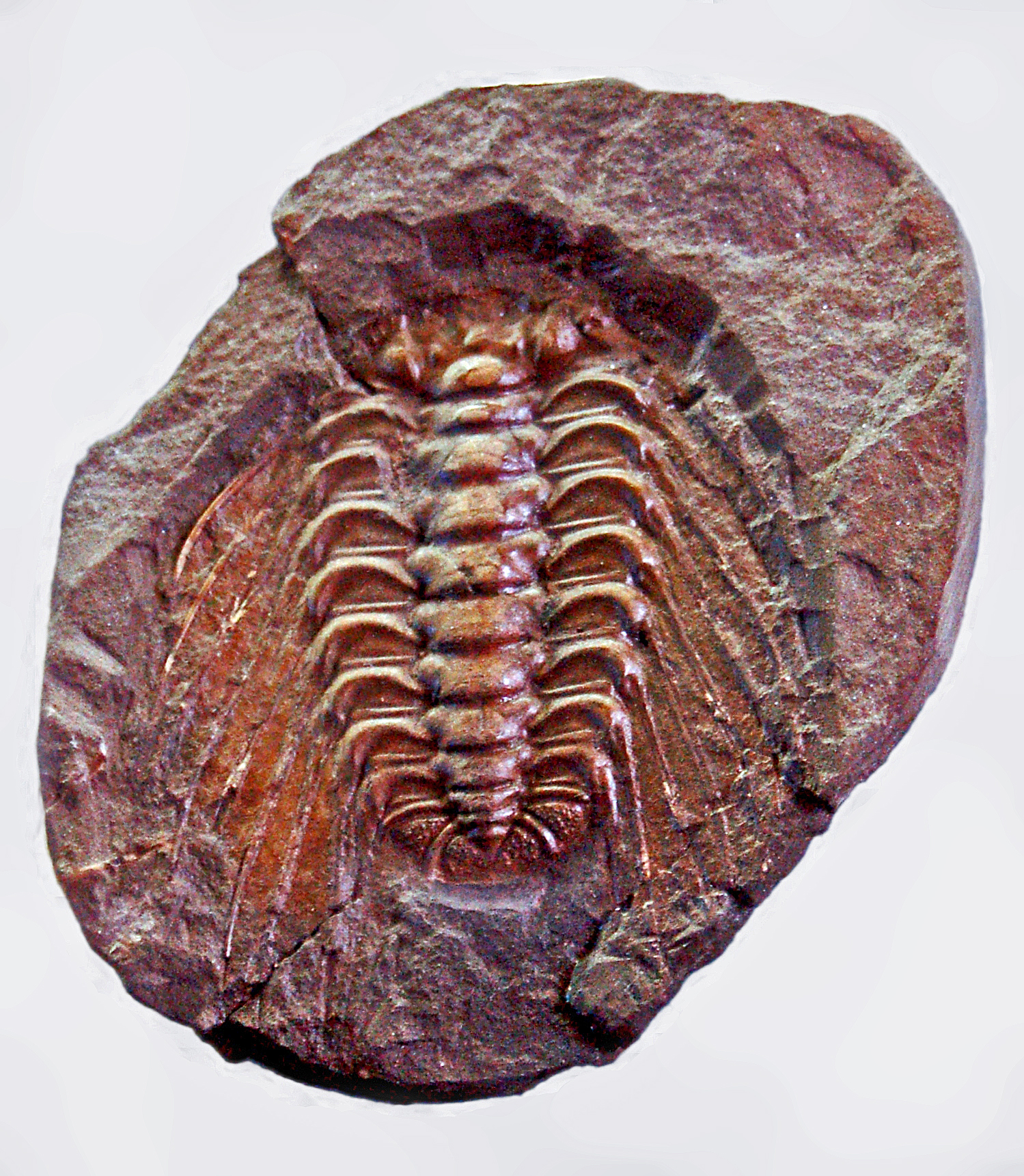
- Solenopeltis buchi buchi from Czech Republic at the National Museum (Prague)

Scientific classification
- Kingdom: Animalia
- Phylum: Arthropoda
- Clade: †Artiopoda
- Class: †Trilobita
- Order: †Odontopleurida
- Family: †Odontopleuridae
- Genus: †Selenopeltis; Hawle and Corda, 1847

= Selenopeltis =

Selenopeltis Temporal range: Ordovician

Genus of trilobites

Selenopeltis (/sɛliːnoʊpɛltɪs/) is an extinct genus of odontopleurid trilobites in the family Odontopleuridae.

Species in the genus Selenopeltis can reach a length of 115–160 millimetres (4.5–6.3 in) and a width of 115–130 millimetres (4.5–5.1 in). These trilobites show long pleural spines and were a low-level epifaunal detritivore. They lived in the Ordovician period, from the Lower Arenig stage age until the Ashgillian age (478.6-443.7 million years ago).

== Distribution ==
During the Ordovician they inhabited Czech Republic, France, Morocco, Portugal, Spain and the United Kingdom. During the Arenig they lived in France and the UK.

== Gallery ==
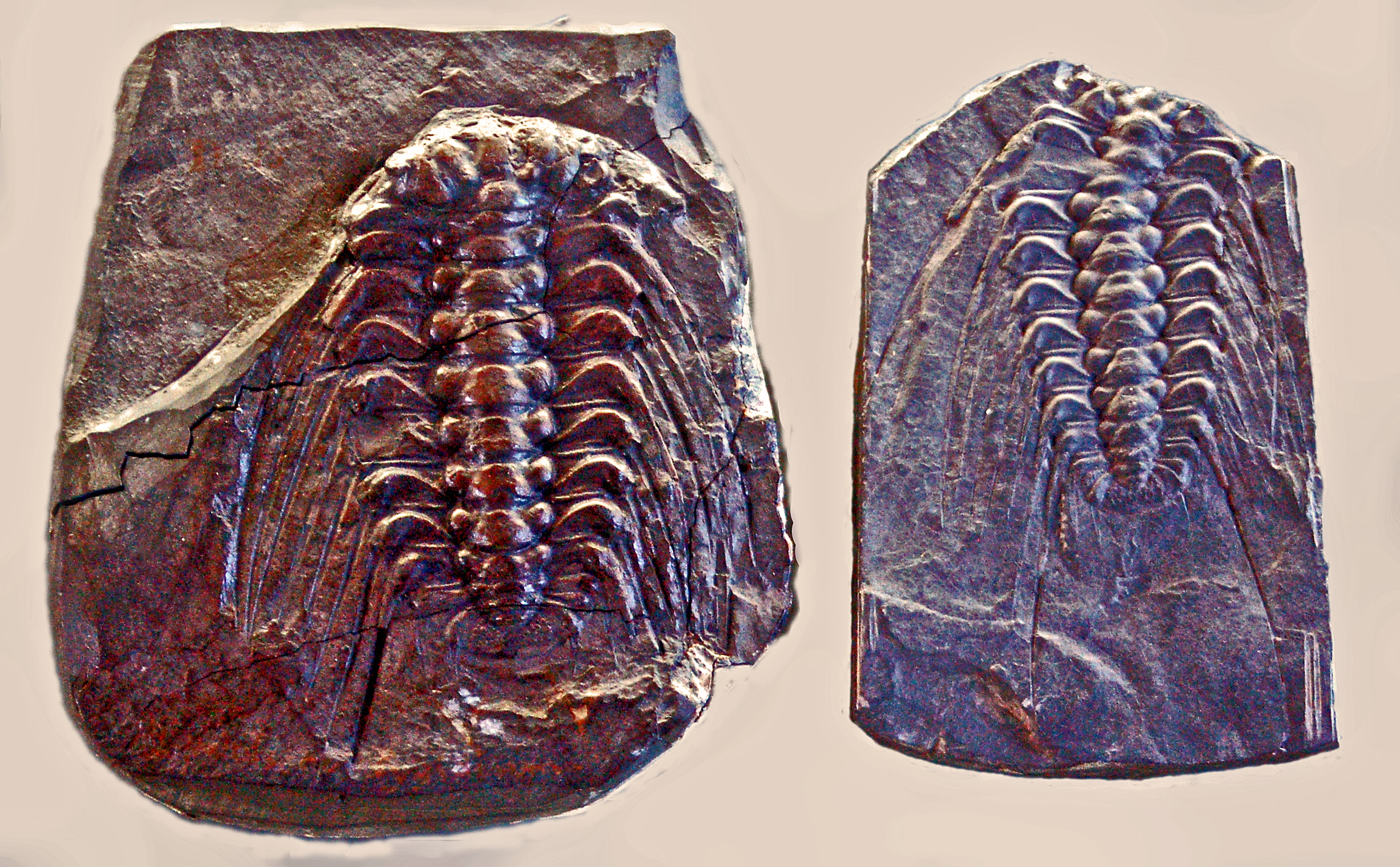
Selenopeltis buchi vultuosa from Czech Republic at the National Museum (Prague)

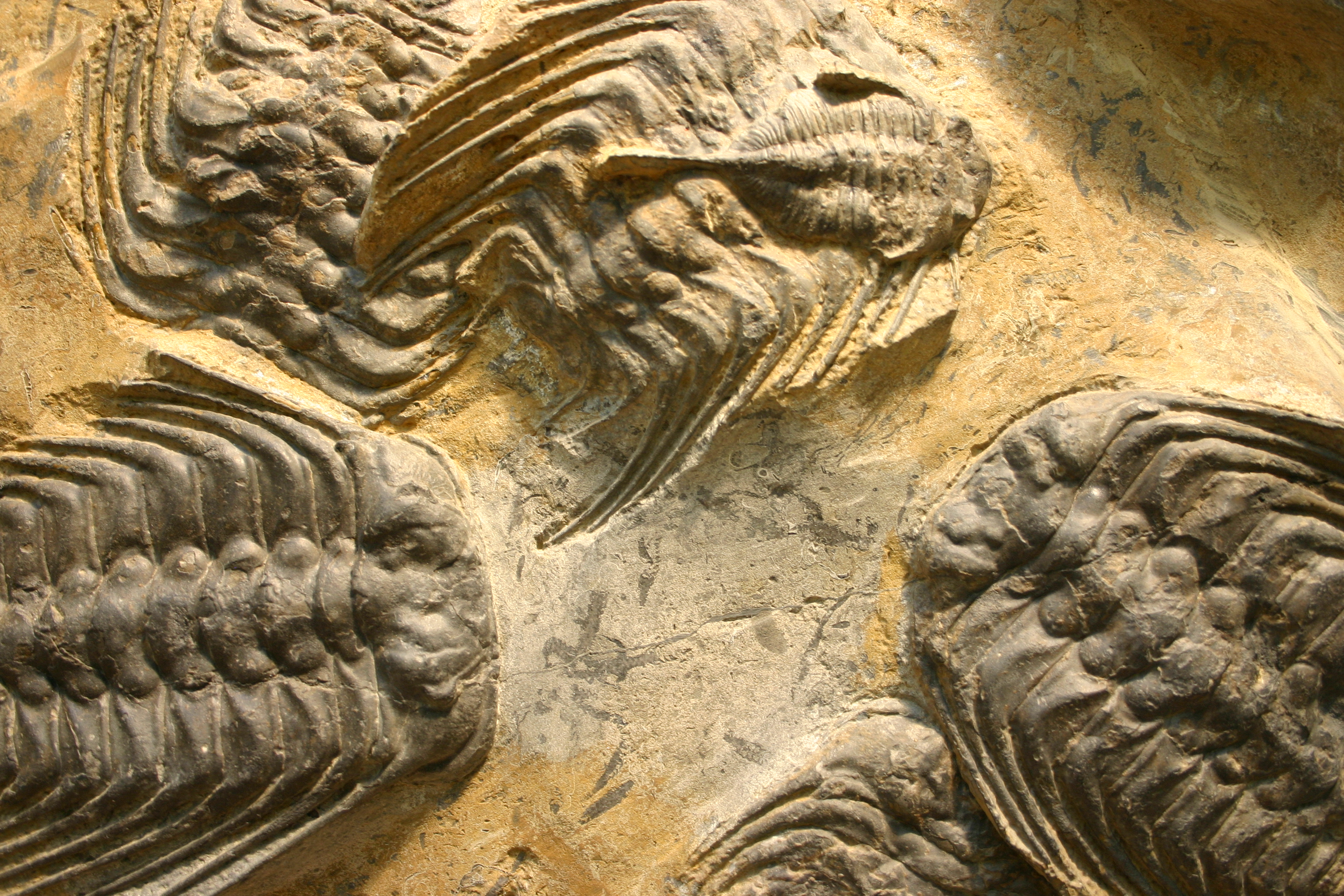
Selenopeltis buchi trilobites (and a smaller Dalmanatina) from Mount Boutschrafin, Morocco.

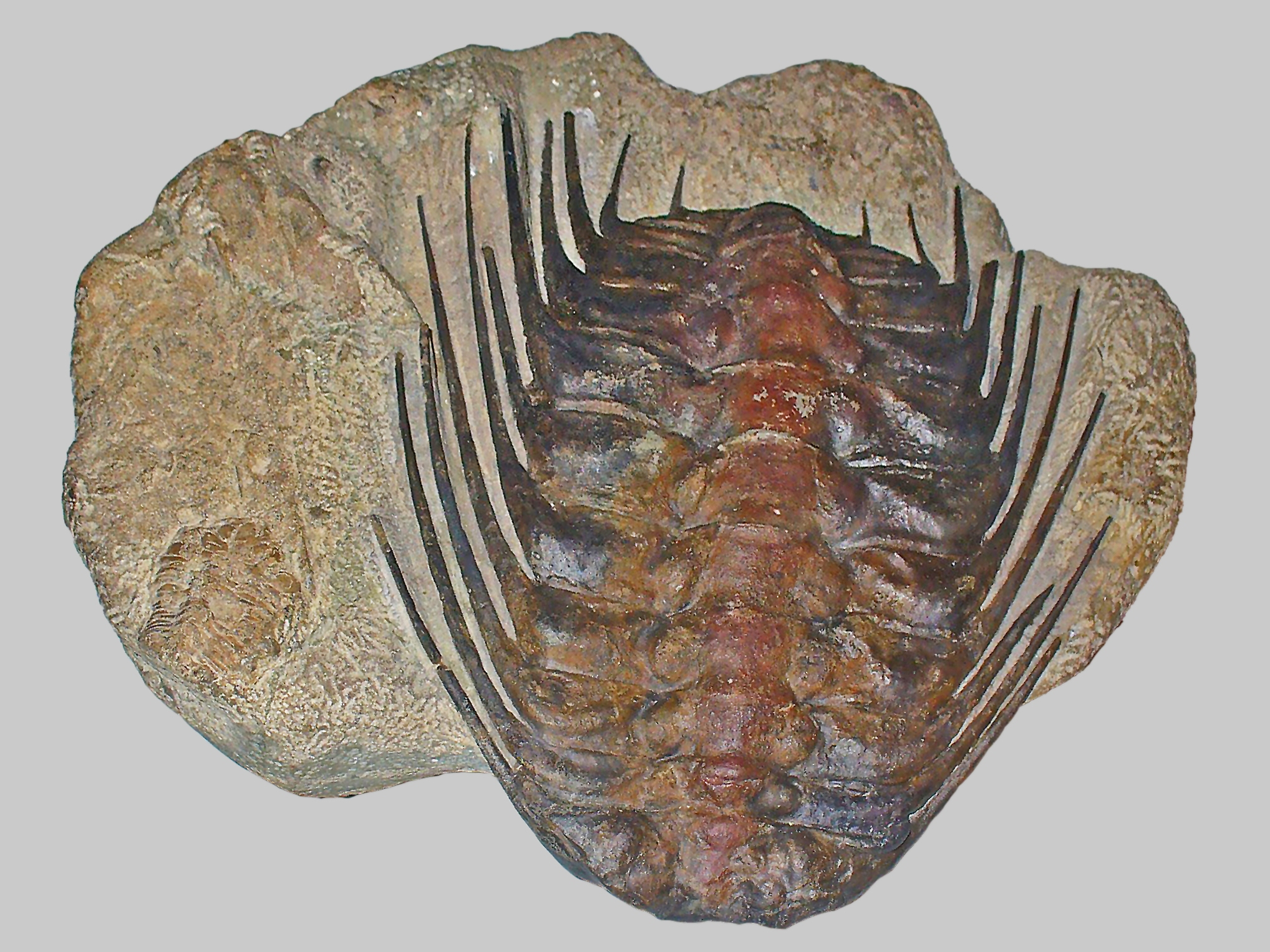
Selenopeltis buchi at Staatliches Museum für Naturkunde Karlsruhe, Germany

== Sources ==
- S. buchii at Fossilmuseum
- Selenopeltis sp. at Origins.swau.edu
