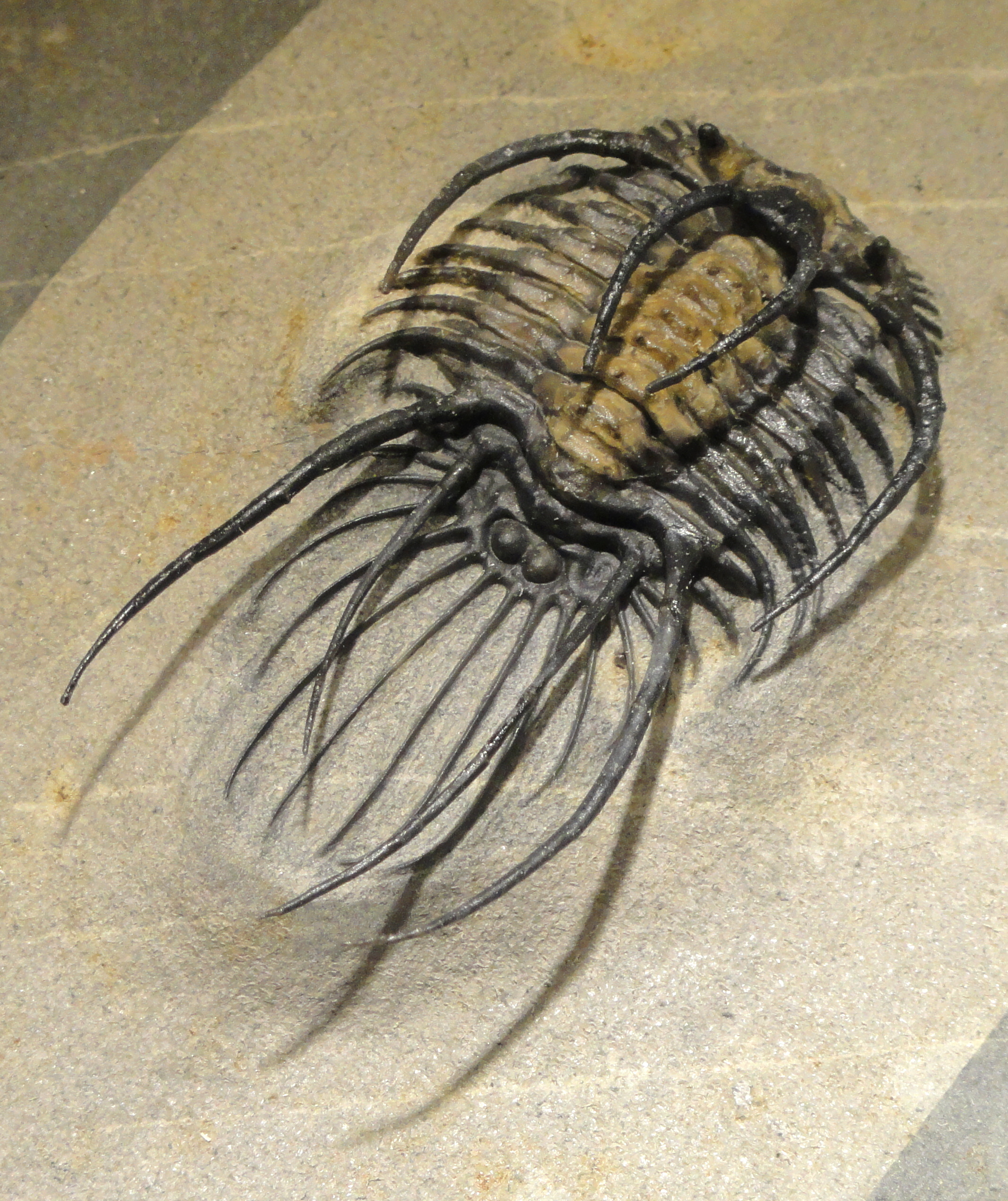
- Radiaspis sp.

Scientific classification
- Kingdom: Animalia
- Phylum: Arthropoda
- Clade: †Artiopoda
- Class: †Trilobita
- Order: †Odontopleurida
- Family: †Odontopleuridae; Burmeister, 1843

Genera
- See text

= Odontopleuridae =

Odontopleuridae Temporal range: Furongian-Frasnian

Family of odontopleurid trilobites

Odontopleuridae is a family of odontopleurid trilobites found in marine strata throughout the world. The family is Late Cambrian to Frasnian in age. The members of Odontopleuridae are known for their spinose appearance, having long, often numerous spines along the edges of their exoskeletons, and derived from ends of segments or tubercle ornaments.

== Genera ==
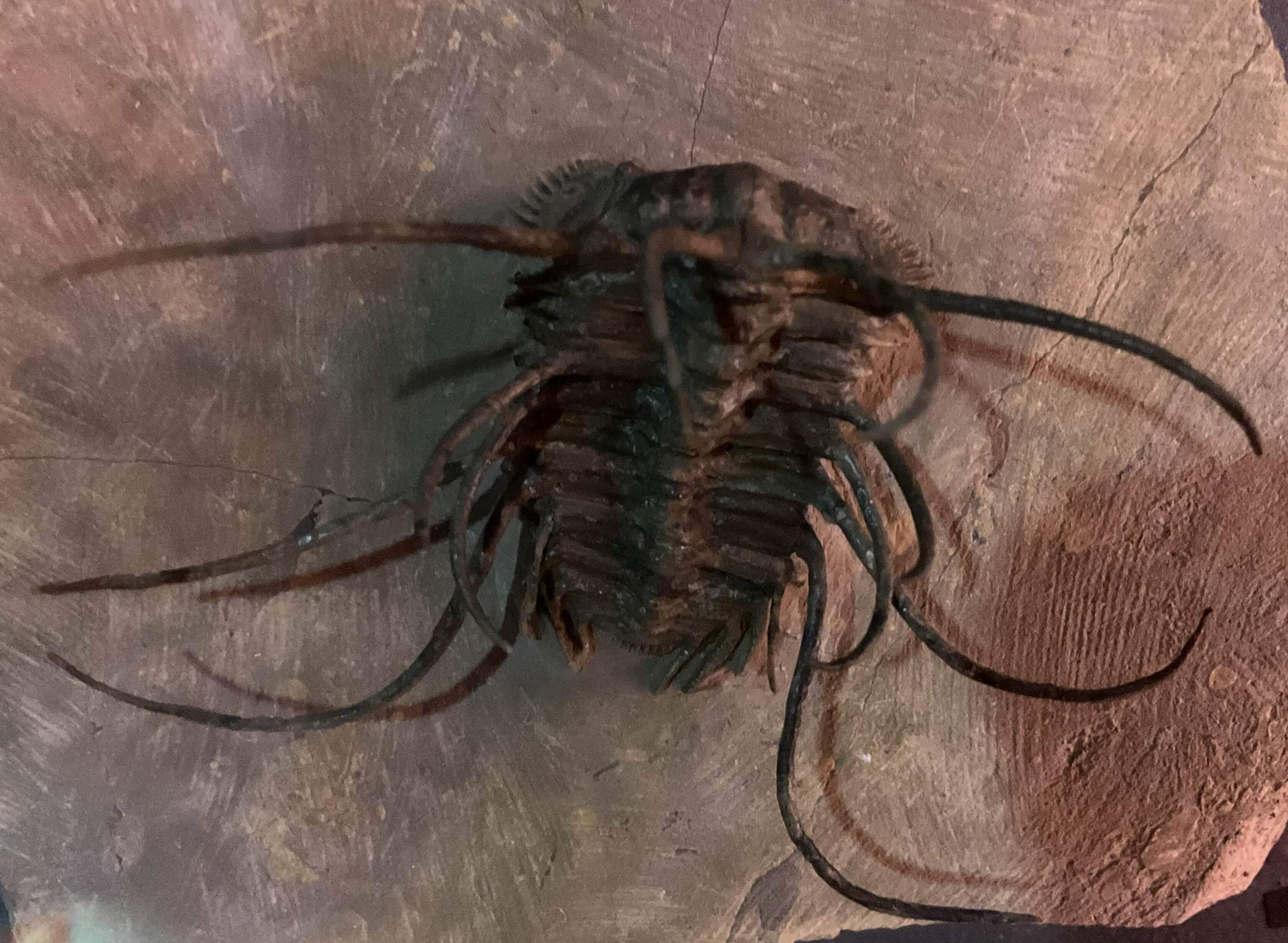
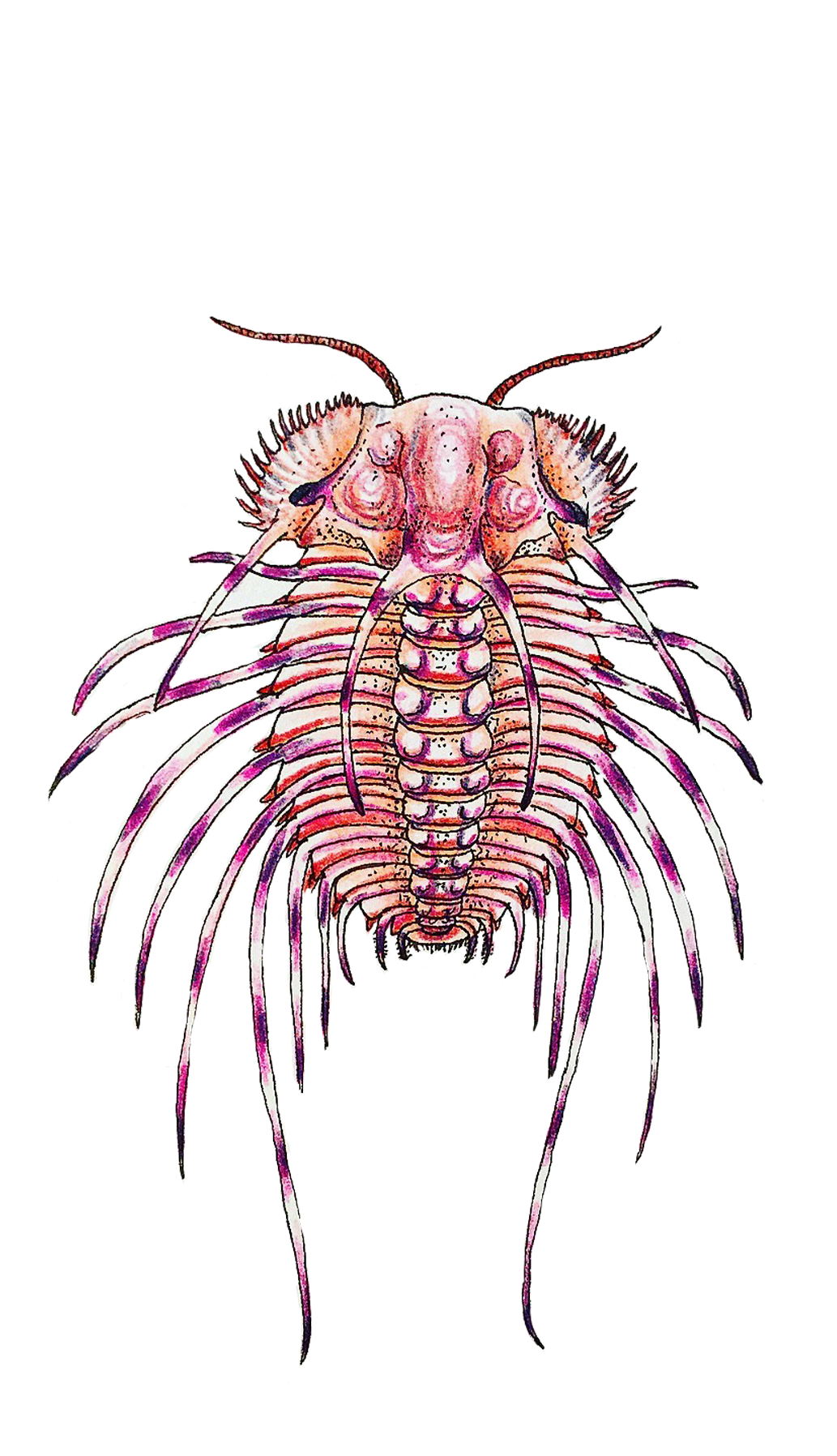
Ceratonurus

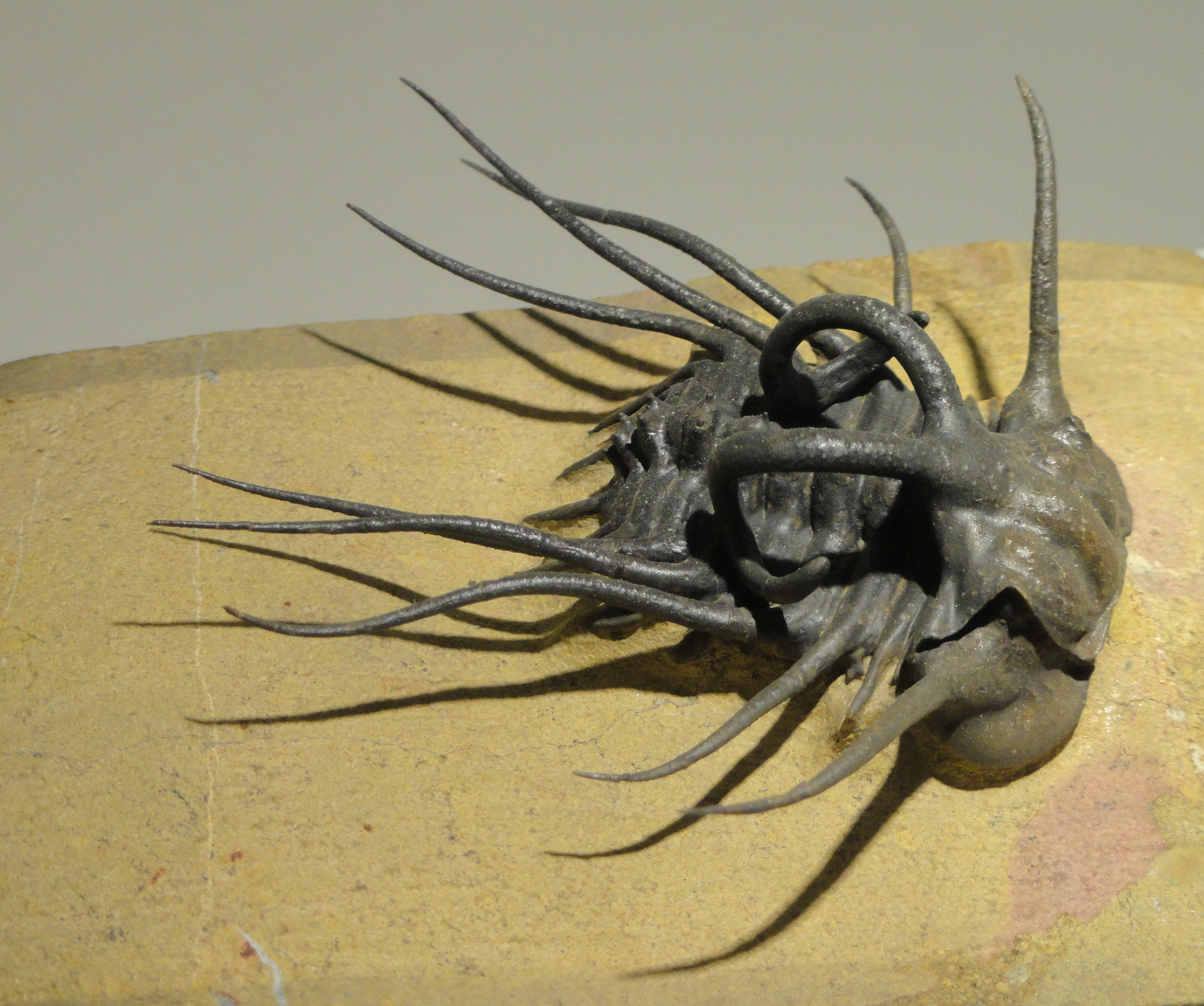
Dicranurus monstrosus

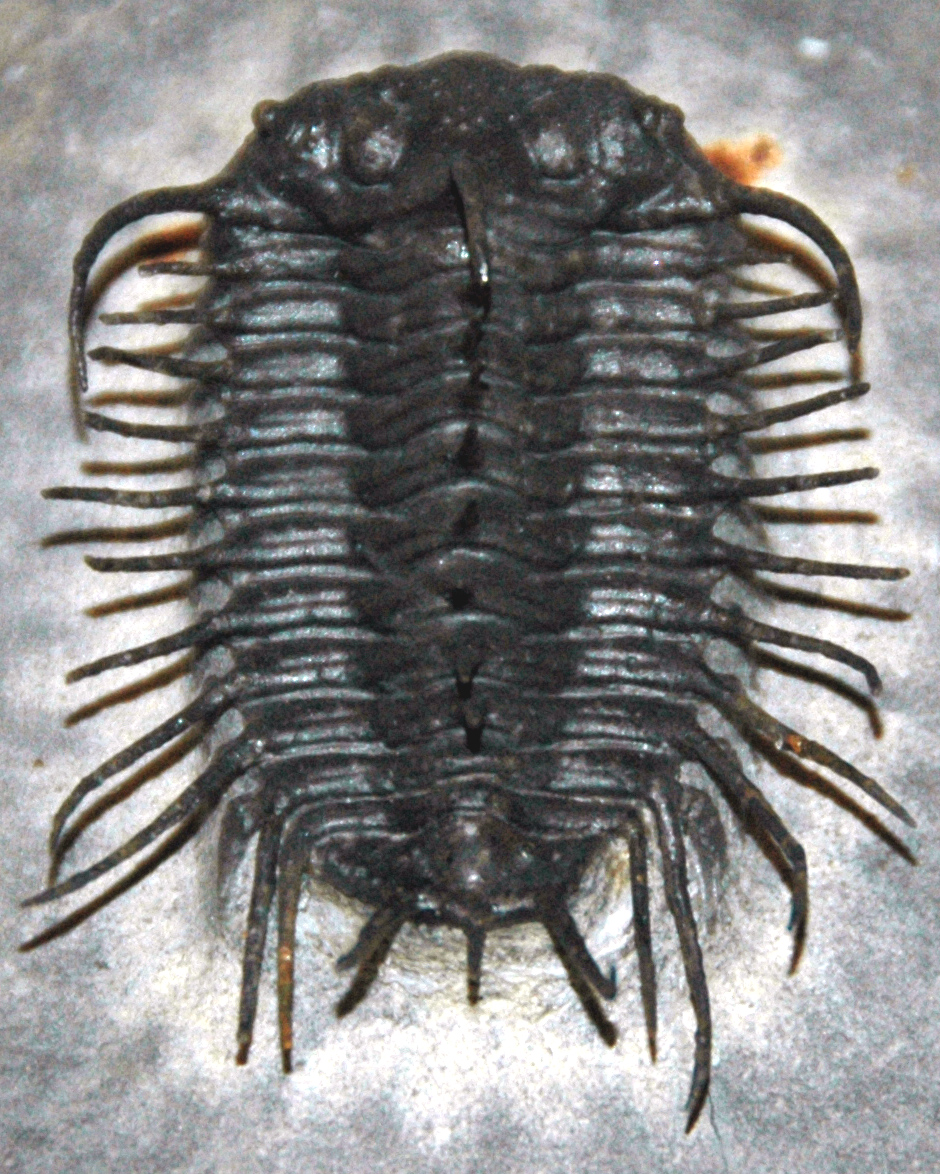
Isoprusia tafilaltana

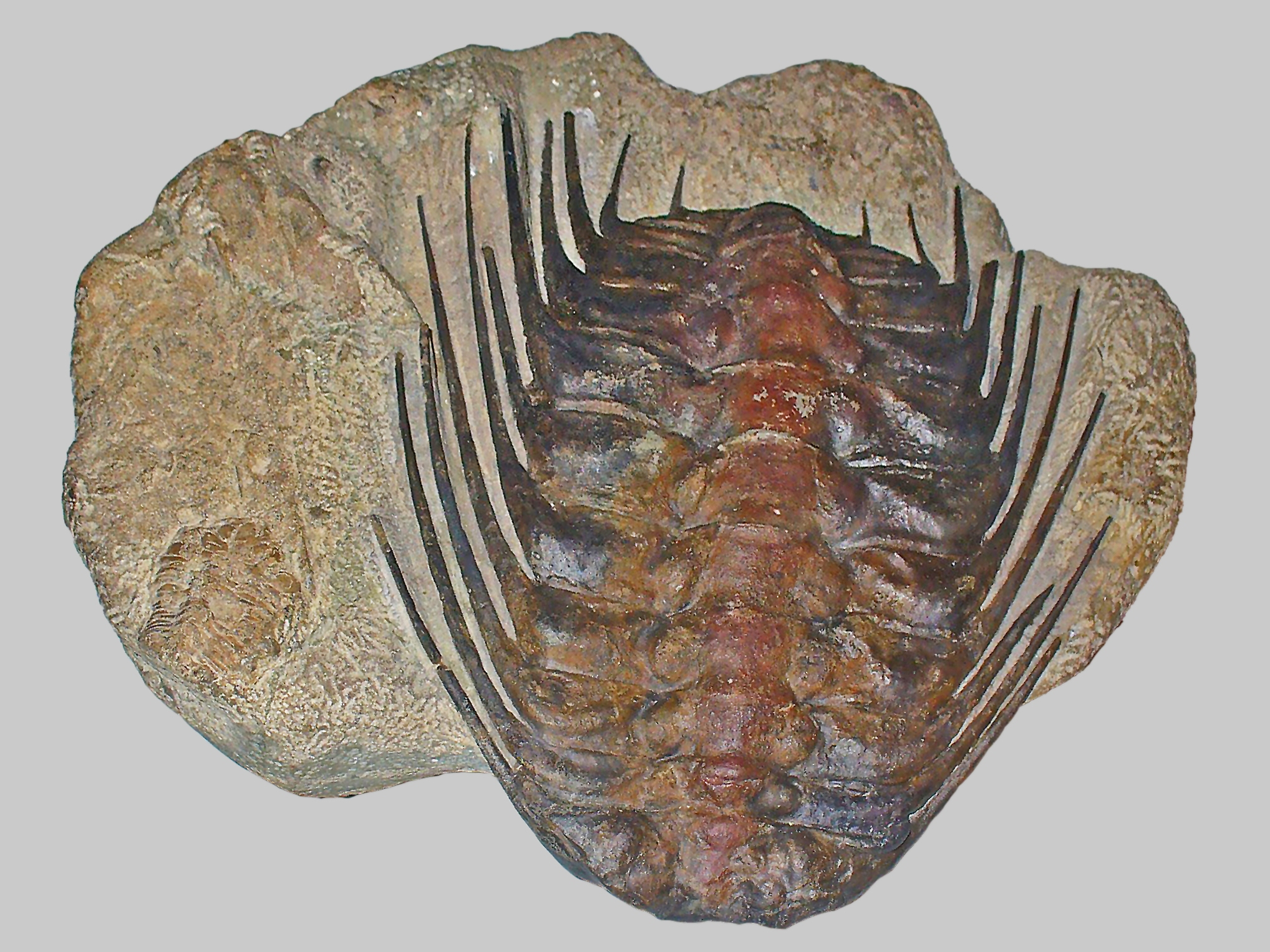
Selenopeltis buchii

Odontopleuridae includes the following genera:

- Acanthalomina
- ?Acidaspidella
- ?Acidaspides
- Acidaspis
- Anacaenaspis
- Apianurus
- Archaeopleura
- Boedaspis
- Borkopleura
- Brutonaspis
- Calipernurus
- Ceratocara
- Ceratocephala
- Ceratocephalinus
- Ceratonurus
- Chlustinia
- Dalaspis
- Diacanthaspis
- Dicranurus
- Dudleyaspis
- Edgecombeaspis
- Eoleonaspis
- Exallaspis
- Funeralaspis
- Gaotania
- Globulaspis
- Hispaniaspis
- Isoprusia
- Ivanopleura
- Kettneraspis
- Koneprusia
- Laethoprusia
- Leonaspis
- Meadowtownella
- Miraspis
- Ningnanaspis
- Odontopleura
- Orphanaspis
- Periallaspis
- Primaspis
- Proceratocephala
- Radiaspis
- Rinconaspis
- Selenopeltis
- Selenopeltoides
- Sinespinaspis
- Stelckaspis
- Taemasaspis
- Uriarra
- Whittingtonia
