= Ceratocephala (trilobite) =

Scientific classification
- Domain: Eukaryota
- Kingdom: Animalia
- Phylum: Arthropoda
- Class: †Trilobita
- Order: †Odontopleurida
- Family: †Odontopleuridae
- Genus: †Ceratocephala; Warder, 1838

Species
- Ceratocephala goniata Ceratocephala graffhami

Genus of trilobites

Ceratocephala is a trilobite genus in the family Odontopleuridae.
