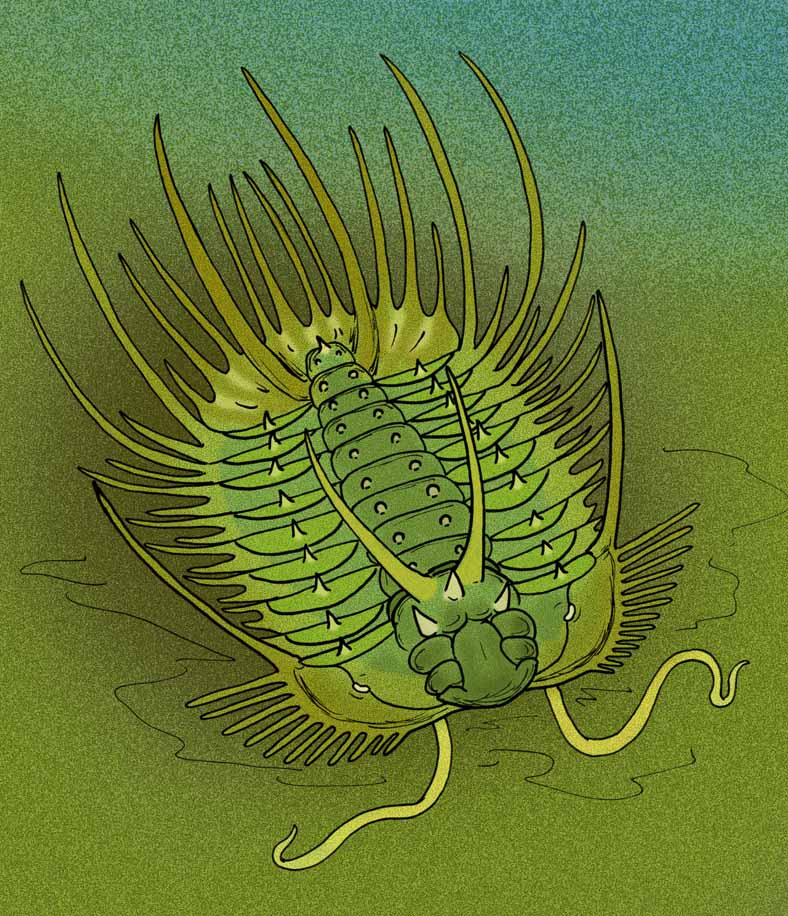
- O. ovata

Scientific classification
- Domain: Eukaryota
- Kingdom: Animalia
- Phylum: Arthropoda
- Class: †Trilobita
- Order: †Odontopleurida
- Family: †Odontopleuridae
- Genus: †Odontopleura; Emmrich, 1839

Type species
- Odontopleura ovata Emmrich, 1839

Species
- O. callicera; O. generalandersi Borowski, 2008; O. markhami Edgecomb & Sherwin, 2001; O. ovata Emmrich, 1839

= Odontopleura =

Odontopleura Temporal range: Late Ordovician-Mid Devonian ~449–388 Ma

Extinct genus of trilobites

Odontopleura is a genus of spinose odontopleurid trilobite in the family Odontopleuridae, and is the type genus of that family and of Odontopleurida. The various species are found in Upper Ordovician to Middle Devonian marine strata throughout the world. The best studied fossils are of the type species, O. ovata, from the Wenlock-aged Liteň Formation in Loděnice, in Bohemia, Czech Republic, and, southeastern Gotland, of Sweden.

== Distribution ==
Fossils of Odontopleura have been found in:

Devonian

China, Floresta Formation, Altiplano Cundiboyacense, Colombia

Silurian

Canada (Northwest Territories, Quebec), China, the Czech Republic, Poland, United States (Iowa, New York)

Ordovician

United States (Indiana, Ohio, Virginia)
