= Ronald Pearson Tripp =

British paleontologist (1914–2001)

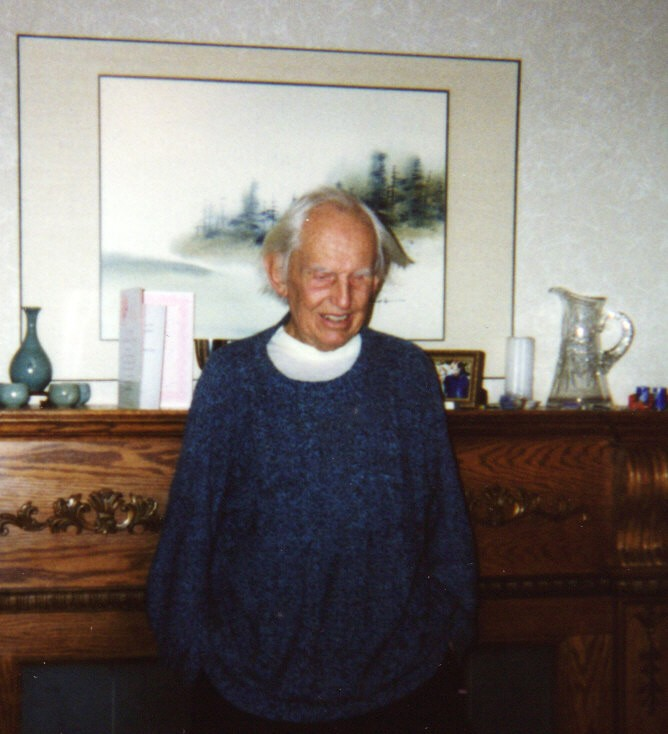
- Tripp at his home in Toronto, 1998
- Born: August 1914; England
- Died: 29 December 2001 (aged 86–87); Toronto, Canada
- Education: English Literature, 1993
- Alma mater: University of Toronto
- Known for: Trilobite taxonomy; pioneering a technique for identifying individual glabellar tubercles for taxonomic purposes
- Awards: Worth Prize, Geological Society of London, 1965
- Scientific career
- Fields: Palaeontology
- Institutions: Research Associate at the Natural History Museum, London and Royal Ontario Museum

Ronald Pearson Tripp FRSE (1914 – 2001) was a British palaeontologist specializing in trilobites. He was self-taught in palaeontology and became an authority on the taxonomy of the trilobite order Lichida and the trilobite family Encrinuridae.

== Early life ==
Encouraged by his school science master, Ron enthusiastically collected Tertiary fossils in Suffolk. He later collected in the Cretaceous rocks of Kent and Sussex, and Ordovician rocks of the Girvan area. The latter material was used in the studies of F.R.C. Reed. He trained as a Spitfire pilot in World War II, and published his first paper in 1954 on the Ordovician trilobites of Girvan. Many other papers would follow. He was employed by British Cake and Oils from early on until about 1970.

== Treatise on Invertebrate Paleontology ==
During preparation of the first edition of the Treatise on Invertebrate Paleontology, Cyril James Stubblefield asked Tripp to step in to write the Lichid section of the Trilobite volume, in place of Elsa Warburg, who had died before her work was complete. As part of this ambitious effort, Tripp established the new family, Lichakephalidae.

== Work on the Encrinuridae ==
By the time Tripp had begun working on the Treatise, he became interested in the tuberculated family of trilobites---the Encrinuridae. Elaborating on the work of Russian palaeontologist, Elsa Rosenstein, Tripp began developing an innovative system of distinguishing encrinurid taxa on the basis of the arrangement of their glabellar tubercles. For the next several decades, this was an important part of encrinurine diagnoses. For example, he used glabellar tubercle arrangement to help characterize "species groups" that F.R.C. Reed had recognized within Encrinurus. This set the groundwork for an eventual major splitting of a genus that had become a virtual garbage pail of encrinurids. While he did author some of these genera himself to ease this confusion, he was extremely cautious to avoid over-splitting and creating too many names.

== Later years ==
While as Research Associate at the Natural History Museum (London) and Royal Ontario Museum, Tripp conducted numerous trilobite studies, particularly concerning encrinurid taxonomy. His colleagues and co-authors during or prior to that time included Euan Clarkson, Bill Evitt, Richard Fortey, Chris Gass, Yvonne Howells, Keith Ingham, Rolf Ludvigsen, David Rudkin, Cyril James Stubblefield, John Temple, Steve Tunnicliff, Harry Whittington, and Zhou Zhi-yi.

Ron's wife, Doris, whom he had met during his years in Scotland, died in 1980. He married Phyllis Forrest in 1981, and died at their home in Toronto in 2001.
