= Day Point Formation =

Geologic formation in New York and Vermont, United States

- Stratigraphic range: Ordovician
- Type: Formation

Location
- Region: New York, Vermont
- Country: United States

The Day Point Formation is a geologic formation in New York and Vermont. It preserves fossils dating back to the Ordovician period.

== See also ==
- List of fossiliferous stratigraphic units in New York
