= Paleontology in Vermont =

Paleontological research in the U.S. state of Vermont

The location of the state of Vermont.

Paleontology in Vermont comprises paleontological research occurring within or conducted by people from the U.S. state of Vermont. Fossils are generally uncommon in Vermont. Nevertheless, however, significant finds have been made in the state. Very few fossils are known in Vermont east of the Green Mountains due to the type of rock underlying that area. During the early part of the Paleozoic era, Vermont was covered by a warm, shallow sea that would end up being home to creatures like brachiopods, corals, crinoids, ostracoderms, and trilobites. There are no rocks in the state from the Carboniferous, Permian, Triassic, or Jurassic periods. The few Cretaceous rocks present contain no fossils. The Paleogene and Neogene periods are also absent from the local rock record. During the Ice Age, glaciers scoured the state. At times the state was inundated by seawater, allowing marine mammals to venture in. After the seawater drained away the state was home to mastodons. Local fossils had already attracted scientific attention by the mid-19th century when mastodon remains were found in Rutland County. In 1950 a major Paleozoic invertebrate find occurred. The Pleistocene Beluga whale Delphinapterus leucas is the Vermont state fossil.

== Prehistory ==
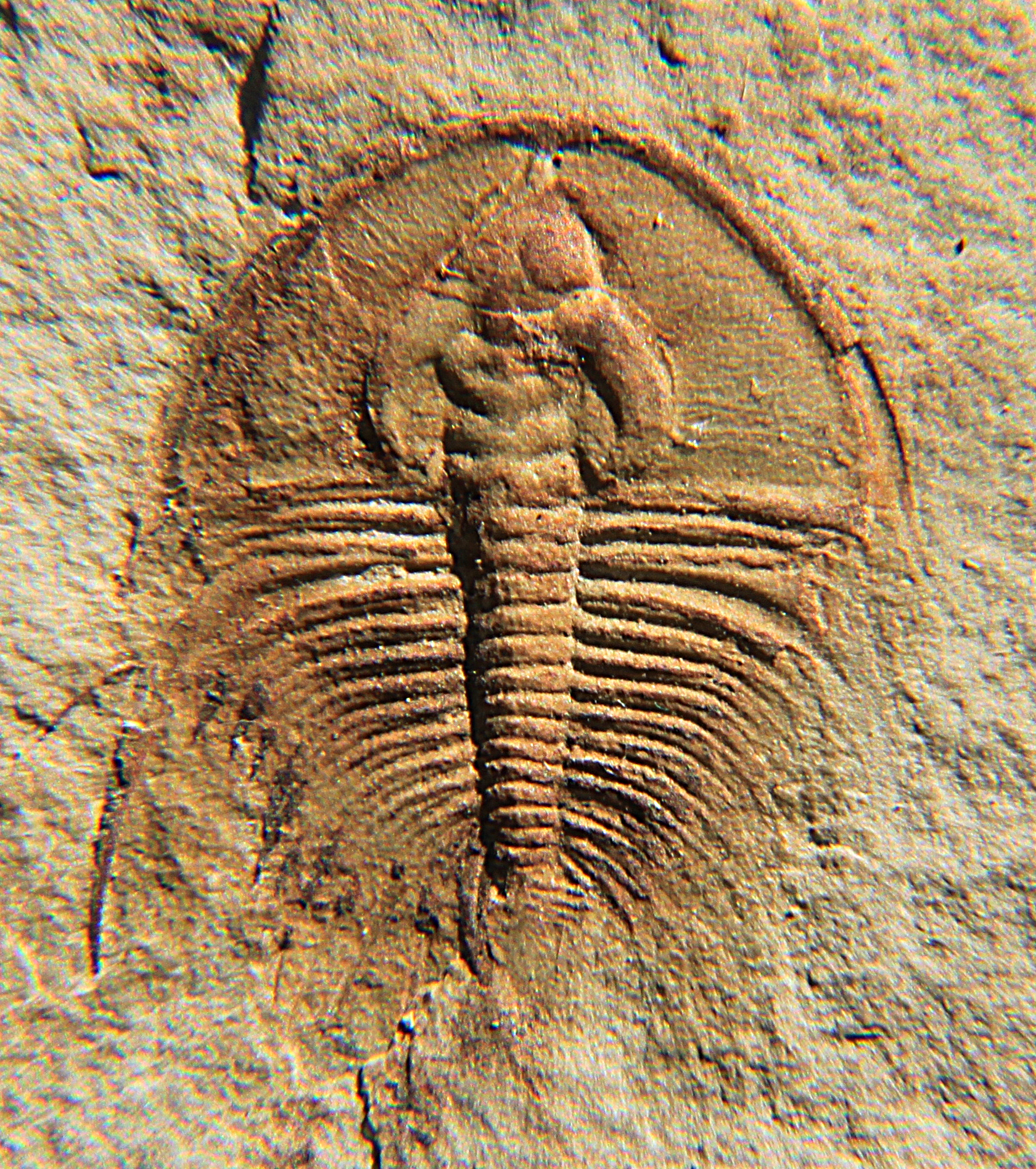
Olenellus.

No Precambrian fossils are known from Vermont. Therefore, the state's fossil record does not begin until the Paleozoic. During the Cambrian period the state was covered by a warm shallow sea. This sea was home to ostracoderms and trilobites. One Cambrian ostracoderm left behind fossil remains in Franklin County. The specimen is now housed in the Princeton University geological museum. Olenellus vermontanus was one Vermont trilobite. At the time of its discovery near Georgia Center it was the most primitive known trilobite in the world. Contemporary local marine animals also left behind fossil tracks and trails.

The warm, shallow sea that covered Cambrian Vermont remained in place into the Ordovician. At the time, Vermont was home to crinoids and cup corals that left behind their remains near Northfield and in the region north of Montpelier. Contemporary local marine animals also left behind fossil tracks and trails. As the Ordovician progressed the sea covering the state deepened. Sea levels rose even further during the ensuing Silurian period. Possible Silurian or Devonian life from Vermont included brachiopods, cephalopods, crinoids, cystoids, corals, and a possible trilobite. These taxa left behind fossils in the regions now 3 miles southwest of Claremont, New Hampshire on the Connecticut River and the Westmore region. An interval of mountain building called the Acadian Orogeny caused widespread geological upheaval during the Devonian. The geological forces involved with this orogeny metamorphosed or destroyed much of the contemporary rock. The ensuing Carboniferous and Permian periods are absent from the state's rock record because local sediments were eroding away instead of being deposited during that interval.

The ensuing Mesozoic era is likewise absent from the local rock record due to erosion with the exception of some igneous rocks that formed during the Cretaceous as a result of the same geologic forces that broke apart Pangaea. Nevertheless, no dinosaur fossils have ever been discovered in Vermont.

The gap continues into the Cenozoic for the entire length of the Paleogene and Neogene periods. During the Quaternary period the state was covered with glaciers. At the far western edge of the state ancient lakes accumulated sediments that document the incursion of seawater into the lakes which raised the amount of salt in the water. Whales ventured into the state. After the glaciers melted and their weight was no longer depressing the elevation of the local land compared to the sea, the area was finally cut off from salt water. Mastodons also made their home in the state.

== History ==
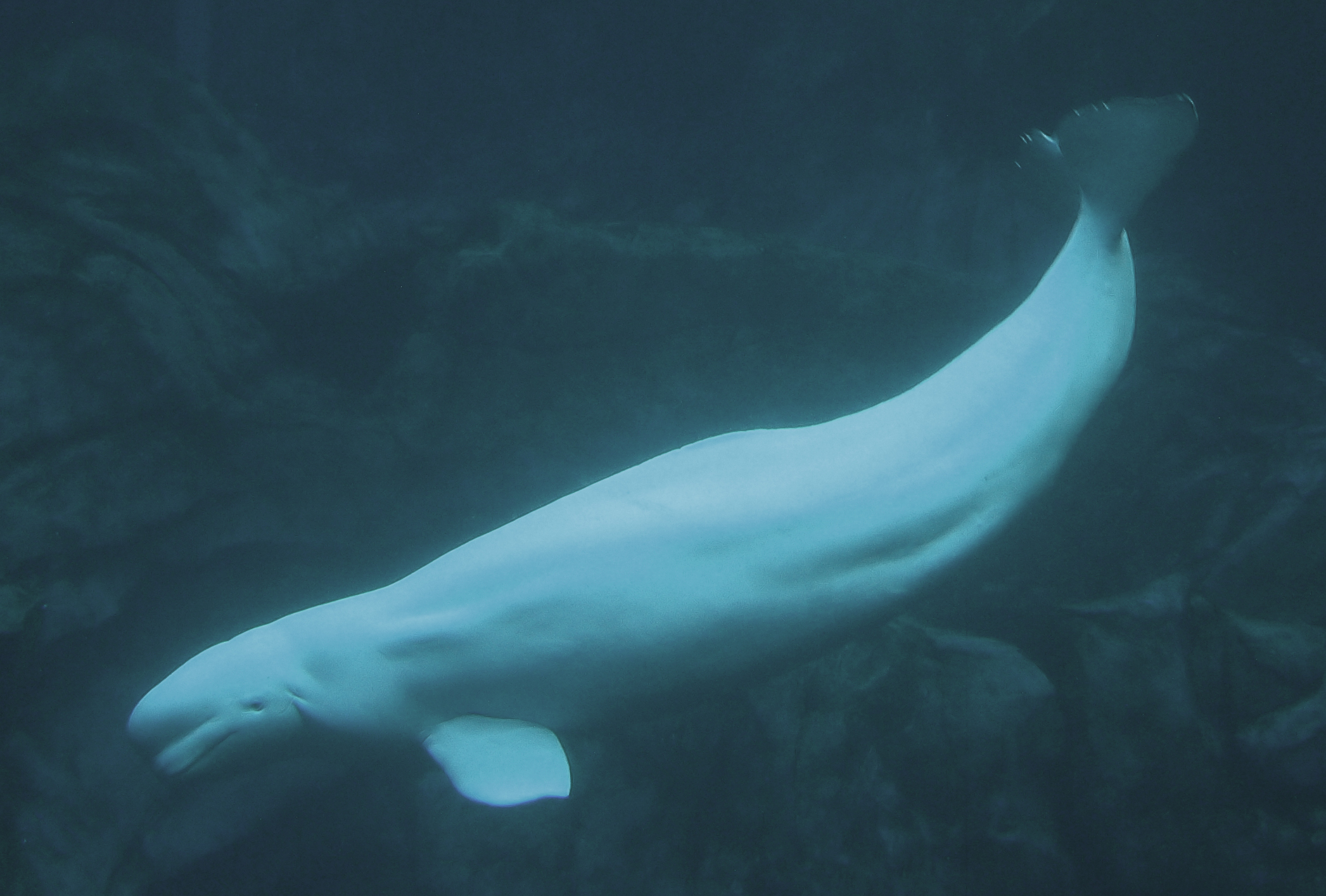
A living beluga.

Some of the first scientifically documented fossil finds in Vermont occurred in the mid-19th century. In 1848 men working on the railroad in Rutland County uncovered the tusk, teeth, and bones of a mammoth. In 1849 the complete skeleton of a primitive whale was discovered. Since then, it has been locally known as the 'Charlotte whale'. Like the 1848 mammoth remains, this find also occurred at the railroad. However, this finding occurred in a Chittenden County Rutland Railroad cut near the town of Charlotte. In 1950, an abundance of fossils were discovered on the Connecticut River three miles southwest of Claremont, New Hampshire. These included corals, brachiopods, crinoids, cephalopods, and a possible trilobite. The fossils date back to the Silurian or Devonian periods. More recently, in 1993, the Pleistocene Beluga whale Delphinapterus leucas was designated the Vermont state fossil. In 1859, a single tusk was found in Richmond, which was later described by Brigadier General John W. Phelps as being situated in a mud bed about a mile and a half from the Winooski River. A year later, a tusk was discovered in Brattleboro by some laborers who were digging out muck for manure. This fossil was brought to Phelps, who also reported a second set of mammoth remains in Richmond in 1866, dug "from marl pit Rolla Gleason’s farm." In 2014, the 1848 mammoth tooth and tusk were designated as the state terrestrial fossils of Vermont, with the beluga whale skeleton being redesignated as the state marine fossil. The beluga whale is permanently housed at the Perkins Geology Museum in Burlington, with the mammoth remains housed at the Mount Holly Community Historical Museum in Belmont.

== Fossil-bearing Geologic Formations ==
- Beekmantown Group
- Crown Point Formation
- Day Point Formation
- Fort Cassin Formation
- Orwell Limestone
- Valcour Formation

== Notable people ==
- Walter W. Granger was born in Middletown Springs on November 7, 1872.
- Frank Hall Knowlton was born in Brandon on September 2, 1860.
- Zadock Thompson was born in Bridgewater on May 23, 1794

== Museums & Places with Fossils ==
- Fairbanks Museum and Planetarium, St. Johnsbury
- Fleming Museum of Art, Burlington
- Montshire Museum of Science, Norwich
- Mount Holly Community Historical Museum, Belmont
- Perkins Geology Museum at the University of Vermont, Burlington
- Southern Vermont Natural History Museum, Marlboro
- ECHO, Leahy Center for Lake Champlain, Burlington
- The Nature Museum, Grafton
- Vermont Museum of Mining & Minerals, Grafton

== See also ==
- List of the Paleozoic life of Vermont
- Paleontology in Massachusetts
- Paleontology in New Hampshire
- Paleontology in New York
