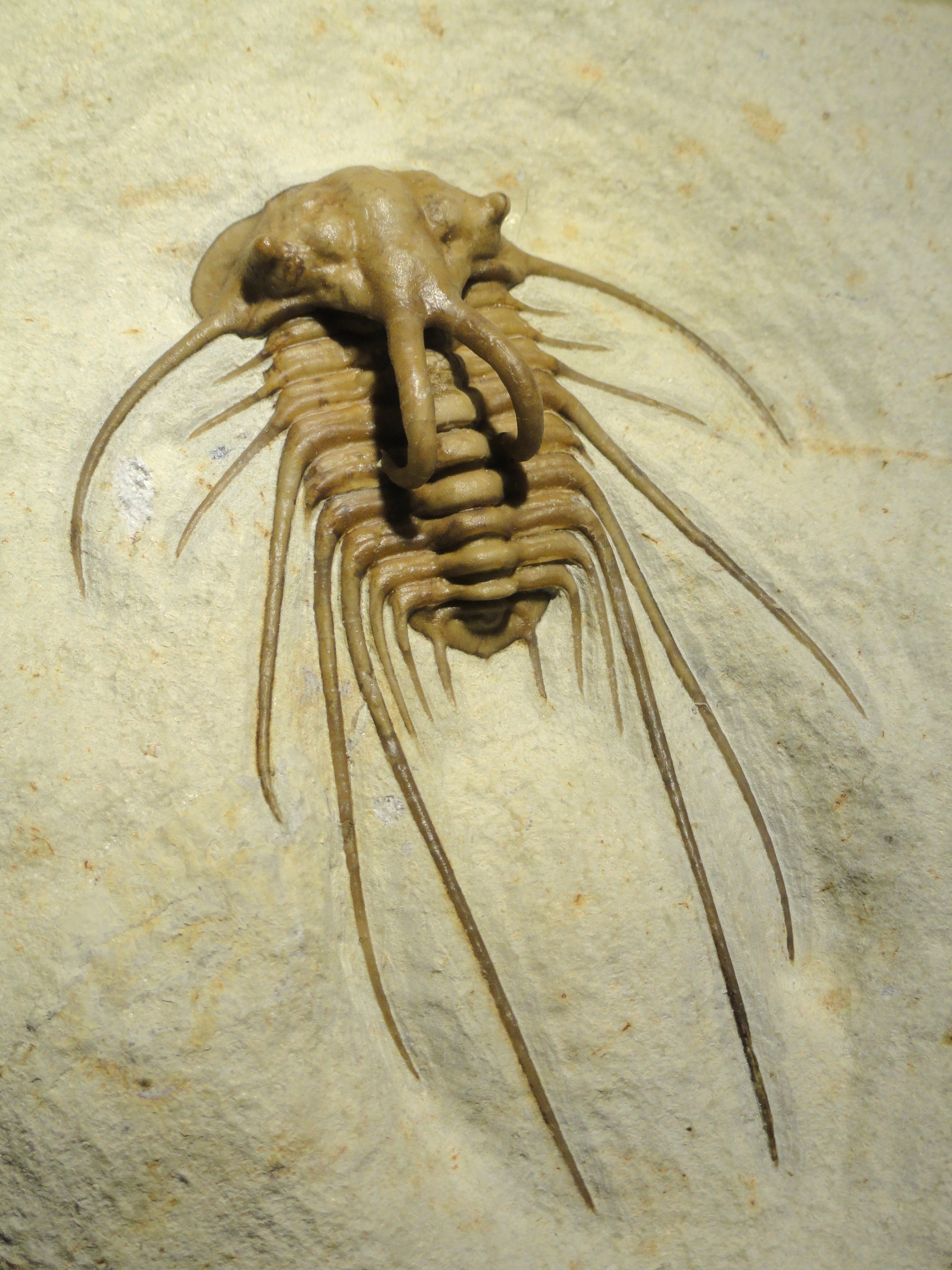
- Dicranurus hamatus elegantus

Scientific classification
- Kingdom: Animalia
- Phylum: Arthropoda
- Clade: †Artiopoda
- Class: †Trilobita
- Order: †Odontopleurida
- Family: †Odontopleuridae
- Genus: †Dicranurus; Conrad, 1841

Species
- Dicranurus hamatus; Dicranurus elegans; Dicranurus monstrosus

= Dicranurus =

Dicranurus Temporal range: Pragian–Emsian

Genus of trilobites

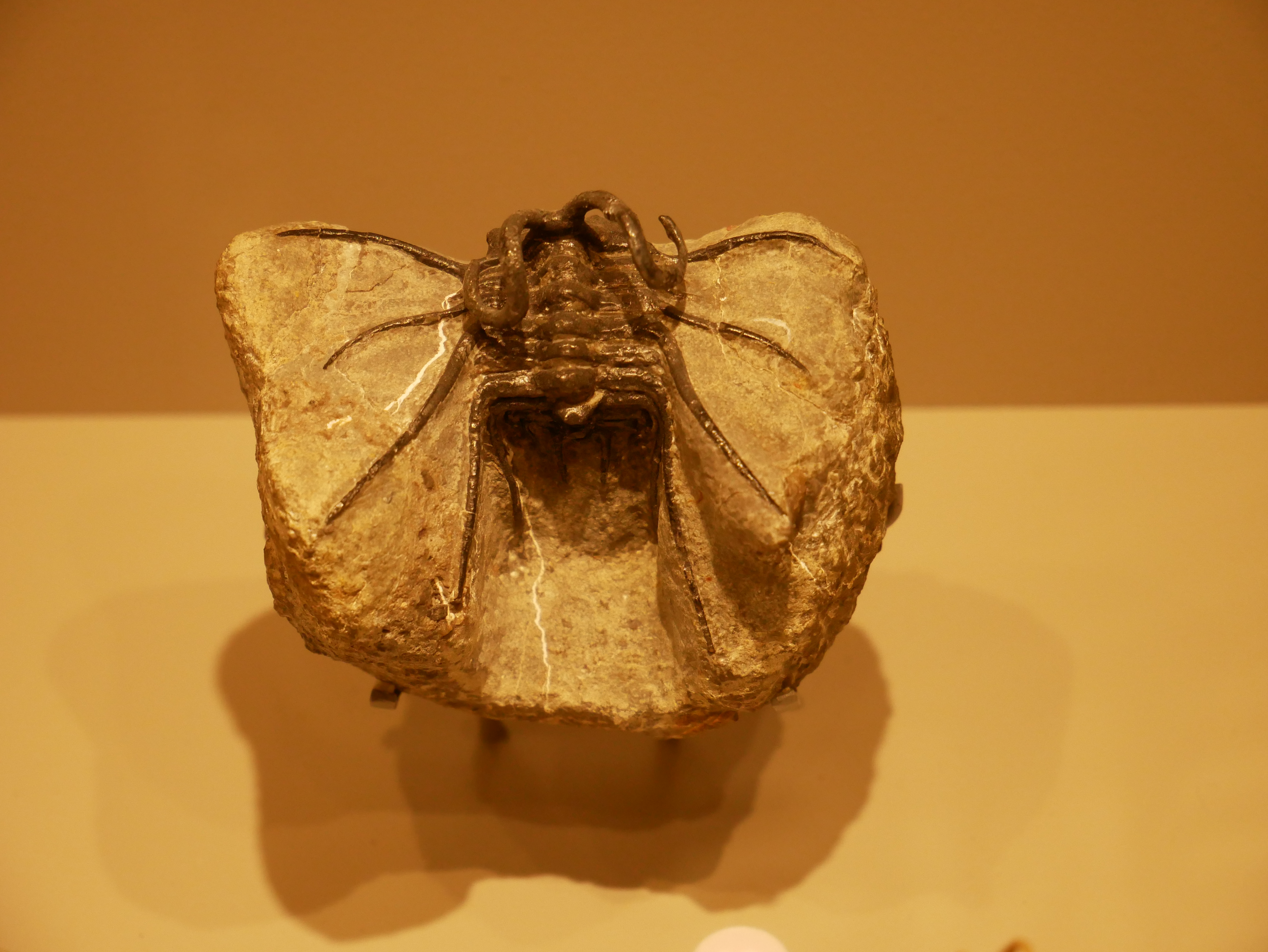
Dicranurus monstrosus

Dicranurus (Greek, 'dikranon', a pitchfork, and 'oura', tail) is a genus of Lower to Middle Devonian odontopleurid trilobites that lived in a shallow sea that lay between Euramerica and Gondwana, corresponding to modern-day Oklahoma and New York, and Morocco, respectively. As such, their fossils are found in New York, Oklahoma, and Morocco. Their bodies averaged about 1 in (25 mm) or so, in length, though their large spines made them at least 2 in (51 mm) in length. Such tremendous spines may have hampered the ability of predators, such as arthrodire placoderms, to attack them, and to help prevent them from sinking into the soft mud of their environment. Dicranurus trilobites are distinguished from other odontopleurids by the pair of large, curled, horn-like spines that emanate from behind the glabellum. The genus name refers to its distinctive horns.

== In popular culture ==
- Dicranurus was an inspiration for an early version of an alien creature from the 2012 movie Prometheus. While the final design does not look much like Dicranurus, the creature is still referred to as "trilobite" due to its inspiration.
