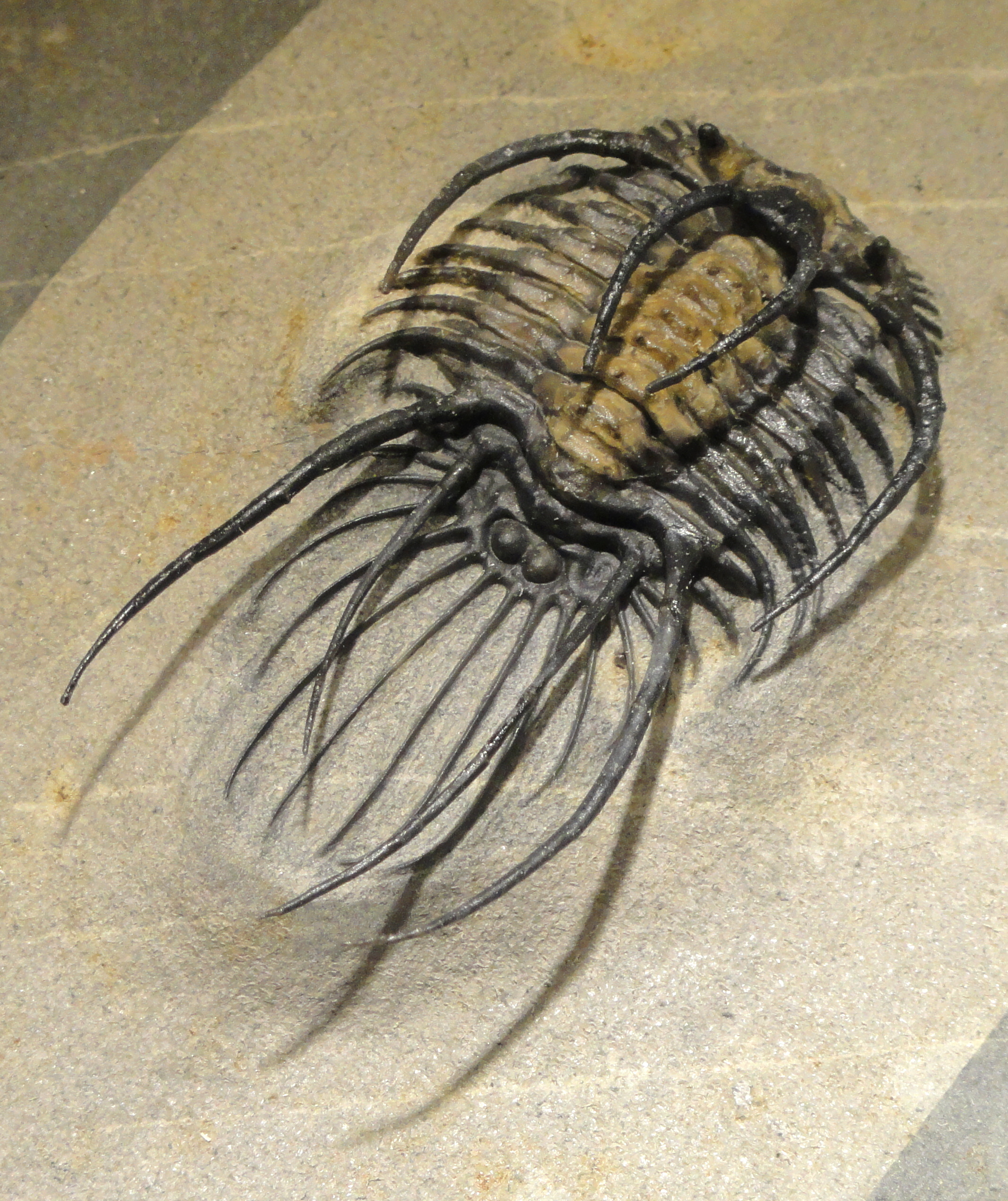
- Radiaspis sp.

Scientific classification
- Kingdom: Animalia
- Phylum: Arthropoda
- Clade: †Artiopoda
- Class: †Trilobita
- Order: †Odontopleurida; Whittington, 1959

Families
- Damesellidae; Odontopleuridae

= Odontopleurida =

Odontopleurida Temporal range: Middle Cambrian–Frasnian

Order of trilobites

Odontopleurida is an order of very spinose trilobites closely related to the trilobites of the order Lichida. Some experts group the Odontopleurid families, Odontopleuridae and Damesellidae, within Lichida. Odontopleurids tend to have convex, bar-shaped cephalons, and lobed, knob-shaped glabella that extend to, or almost to the anterior margin. Many, if not almost all odontopleurids have long spines that are derived either from the margins of the exoskeleton, or from granular or tubercular ornamentation, or both. There are odontopleurids so spinose as to have spines on some of their spines. Odontopleurids have 8 to 13 thoracic segments, with Odontopleuridae odontopleurids having no more than 10, and Damesellidae odontopleurids having no more than 13. The pygidium tends to be very small, and invariably has long spines emanating from it in all known genera.

Genera of Damesellidae are restricted to Middle to Upper Cambrian marine strata, and may represent a transition between Cambrian-aged lichids, and odontopleurids of Odontopleuridae. The odontopleurids of Odontopleuridae first appear in the Upper Cambrian, and go extinct before the end of the Frasnian stage of the late Devonian.

== Taxonomy ==
=== Odontopleuridae ===
- Acanthalomina
- ?Acidaspidella
- ?Acidaspides
- Acidaspis
- Anacaenaspis
- Apianurus
- Archaeopleura
- Boedaspis
- Borkopleura
- Brutonaspis
- Calipernurus
- Ceratocara
- Ceratocephala
- Ceratocephalinus
- Ceratonurus
- Chlustinia
- Dalaspis
- Diacanthaspis
- Dicranurus
- Dudleyaspis
- Edgecombeaspis
- Eoleonaspis
- Exallaspis
- Gaotania
- Globulaspis
- Hispaniaspis
- Isoprusia
- Ivanopleura
- Kettneraspis
- Koneprusia
- Laethoprusia
- Leonaspis
- Meadowtownella
- Miraspis
- Ningnanaspis
- Odontopleura
- Orphanaspis
- Periallaspis
- Primaspis
- Proceratocephala
- Radiaspis
- Rinconaspis
- Selenopeltis
- Selenopeltoides
- Sinespinaspis
- Stelckaspis
- Taemasaspis
- Uriarra
- Whittingtonia

=== Damesellidae ===
- ?Adelogonus
- Bergeronites
- Blackwelderia
- Blackwelderioides
- Chiawangella
- Cyrtoprora
- Damesella
- Damesops
- Dipentaspis
- Dipyrgotes
- Duamsannella
- Fengduia
- Guancenshania
- ?Hercantyx
- Histiomona
- Jiawangaspis
- Karslanus
- Liuheaspis
- Metashantungia
- Neodamesella
- Neodrepanura
- Palaeadotes,
- Paradamesella
- Parashantungia
- Pingquania
- Pionaspis
- Protaitzehoia
- Pseudoblackwelderia
- Shantungia
- Stephanocare
- Taihangshania
- Taitzehoia
- Teinistion
- Xintaia
- Yanshanopyge
