= Chazy Group =

Geologic group in Quebec, Canada

- Stratigraphic range: Ordovician
- Type: Group

Location
- Region: Quebec
- Country: Canada

The Chazy Group is a geologic group in Quebec. It preserves fossils dating back to the Ordovician period.

== See also ==
- List of fossiliferous stratigraphic units in Quebec
