= Crown Point Formation =

Geologic formation in New York and Vermont, United States

- Stratigraphic range: Ordovician
- Type: Formation

Lithology
- Primary: Limestone

Location
- Region: New York, Vermont
- Country: United States

The Crown Point Formation is a geologic formation in New York and Vermont. It preserves invertebrate fossils dating back to the Ordovician period. Notable fossiliferous localities within the Crown Point Formation include quarries in the towns of Panton and Isle La Motte, Vermont.

== Invertebrate Fauna ==
Cephalopods of the Crown Point Formation
Genus	Species	Notes	Images
Stereospyroceras	Stereospyroceras champlainensis		
Vaginoceras	Vaginoceras oppletum		
Vaningenoceras	Vaningenoceras sp.		
Proteoceras	Proteoceras perkinsi		
	Proteoceras pulchrum		
Plectoceras	Plectoceras jason		
Nanno	Nanno sp.		

Trilobites of the Crown Point Formation
Genus	Species	Notes	Images
Bumastoides	Bumastoides globosus		
Bumastus	Bumastus erastusi		
Platillaenus	Platillaenus erastusi		
Cryptolithus	Cryptolithus tesselatus		
Hibbertia	Hibbertia valcourensis		
Flexicalymene	Flexicalymene senaria		
Isotelus	Isotelus gigas		
	Isotelus jacobus		
Pliomerops	Pliomerops canadensis		
Vogdesia	Vogdesia bearsi		
Ceratocara	Ceratocara shawi		
Thaleops	Thaleops longispina		
Cybeloides	Cybeloides prima		
Ceraurinella	Ceraurinella latipyga		
Physemataspis	Physemataspis insularis		
Hemiarges	Hemiarges turneri		
Calyptaulax	Calyptaulax annulata		
Otarion	Otarion spinicaudatum		
Lonchodomas	Lonchodomas chaziensis		
Failleana	Failleana calva		
Sphaerocoryphe	Sphaerocoryphe goodnovi		

Echinoderms of the Crown Point Formation
Genus	Species	Notes	Images
Dendrinocrinus	Dendrinocrinus alternatus		

Brachiopods of the Crown Point Formation
Genus	Species	Notes	Images
Ateleasma	Ateleasma multicostum		
Camerella	Camerella varians		
Macrocoelia	Macrocoelia champlainensis		

Corals of the Crown Point Formation
Genus	Species	Notes	Images
Streptelasma	Streptelasma expansum		
Foerstephyllum	Foerstephyllum wissleri		
Lambeophyllum	Lambeophyllum profundum		

Bryozoans of the Crown Point Formation
Genus	Species	Notes	Images
Prasopora	Prasopora orientalis		
Rhinidictya	Rhinidictya fenestrata		
Stictopora	Stictopora ramosa		

Gastropods of the Crown Point Formation
Genus	Species	Notes	Images
Maclurites	Maclurites magnus		

== See also ==
- List of fossiliferous stratigraphic units in New York
