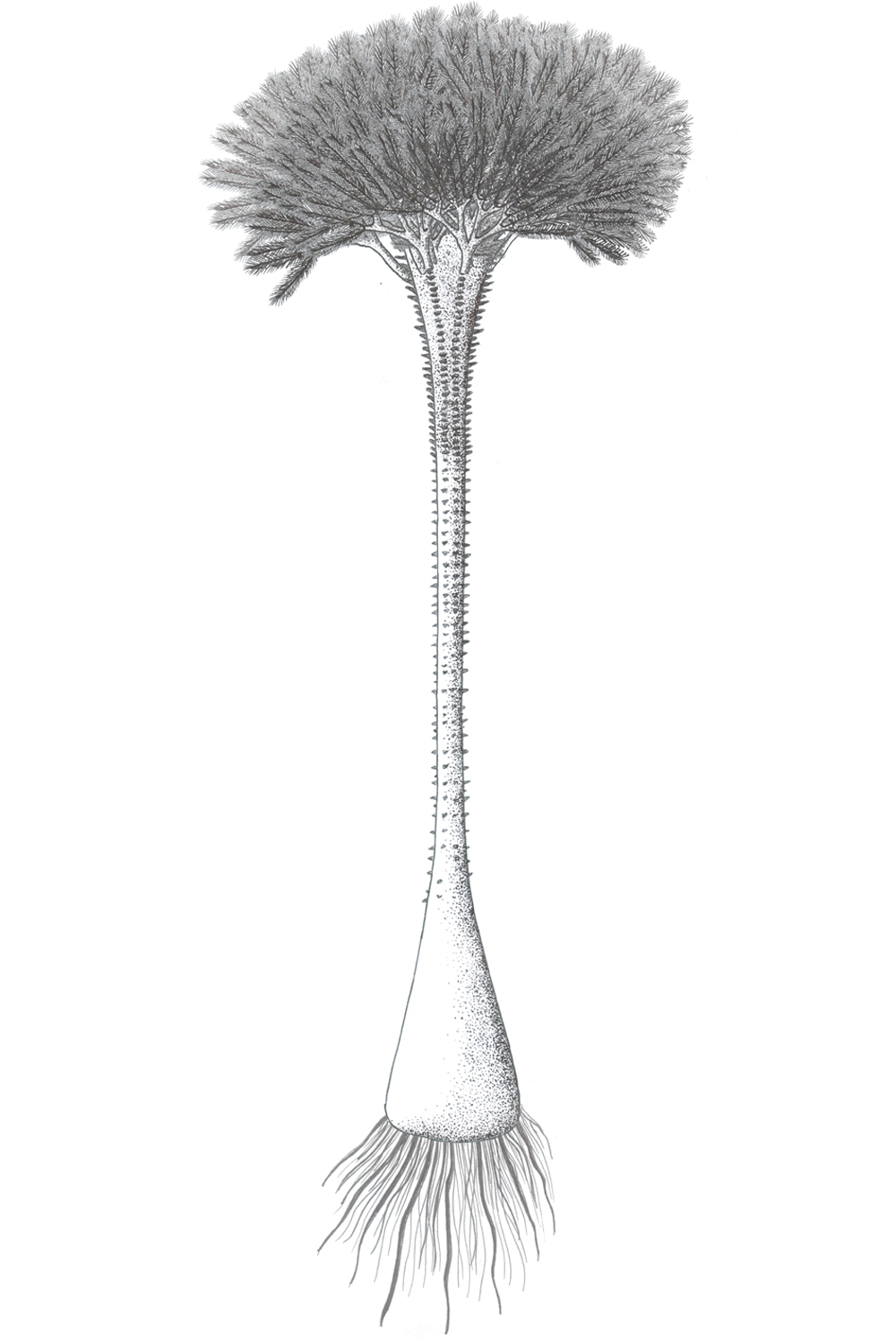

Scientific classification
- Kingdom: Plantae
- Clade: Embryophytes
- Clade: Tracheophytes
- Division: Pteridophyta (?)
- Class: †Cladoxylopsida
- Order: †Pseudosporochnales
- Family: †Hyeniaceae
- Genus: †Calamophyton; R.Kräusel & H.Weyland, 1925

Species
- C. primaevum (Kräusel & Weyland); C. renieri (Leclercq); C. bicephalum (Leclercq & Andrews); C. forbesii (Schopf)

= Calamophyton =

Calamophyton Temporal range: Middle Devonian

Extinct genus of tree

Calamophyton is an extinct genus of tree, or "tree-sized plant", that was extant in the Middle Devonian period. As of 2024, a well-preserved fossilized forest of Calamophyton trees discovered in Somerset, England, represents the earliest-known forest.

== Discovery ==
The genus was established in 1926 from specimens collected by R. Kräusel & H. Weyland, in Hardberg and Kirberg, Rhineland, Germany, who identified the type species Calamophyton primaevum. A second species, C. renieri, was described by Suzanne Leclercq in Belgium in 1940; a third, C. bicephalum, also found in Belgium, by Leclercq and H. Andrews in 1960; and a fourth, C. forbesii, in the Mapleton Sandstone, Maine, United States, by James M. Schopf in 1964. It has since been suggested that C. primaevum and C. bicephalum are conspecific. All specimens date to the Middle Devonian, some 385 to 395 million years ago.

== Description ==
The genus has been described as having an unusual—and unusually complex—morphology, superficially palm-like. Specimens are between 0.8 metres (2 1/2 feet) and 4 metres (13 ft) in height. Like other cladoxylopsids, the tree trunk was hollow, and composed of multiple interconnected longitudinal strands of vascular woody material (xylem). As the xylem bundles grew in diameter, they would split apart from one another near the apex of the trunk, thus limiting the overall height. The trunk apex was domed rather than tapered, and like the trunk base, wider than the midsection. Some trunks may have forked.

Calamophyton did not have leaves, but rather small branches consisting of twig-like structures that grew only at or near the trunk apex, and which were the site of photosynthesis for the plant. As the trunk grew, the lower branches would be shed; a mature tree might in the course of its growth shed as many as 700 to 800 branches, creating a thick carpet of decaying twigs on the ground below, with few understory plants observed. Where other cladoxylopsids shed their branches smoothly, Calamophyton left small stubs behind on the trunk.

The root system consisted of several hundred to more than a thousand strap-like roots of 2–6 millimetres (0.079–0.24 inches) in diameter and, for the larger trunks, in excess of 300 millimetres (12 inches) in length. (Note: Root dimensions given here are based on the specimens of up to 2 metres in height.) The roots were approximately straight, undivided, and extended almost directly downward into the soil. The fossil record indicates that in spite of their small diameter, they were stiff and hardy. Calamophyton reproduced not by seeds, but via spores, one of several characteristics suggesting a relationship with the Pteridophyta.

== Earliest-known forest ==
In March 2024, paleontologists reported the discovery of an intact fossil forest of Calamophyton trees in the Hangman Sandstone Formation at Minehead, Somerset, England. As of the reporting date, it is the earliest forest yet discovered. At an age of 390 million years, the forest pre-dates the previously oldest-known example—a root system probably belonging to Archaeopteris, discovered in 2009 near Cairo, New York—by about four million years. In the Middle Devonian period, when the Calamophyton forest was alive, the Somerset region was adjacent to Germany and Belgium.

According to Christopher Berry, one of the scientists involved in the discovery, the preservation of the Calamophyton fossil forest, with trees still in the positions where they grew, allows a direct, and unprecedented, examination of the local ecology. Of particular interest is the sedimentary system, in which the plants are seen capturing and stabilizing fluvial sediments.
