= Eifelian =

Fourth stage of the Devonian and first stage of the Middle Devonian

- 393.47 ± 0.99 – 387.95 ± 1.04 Ma
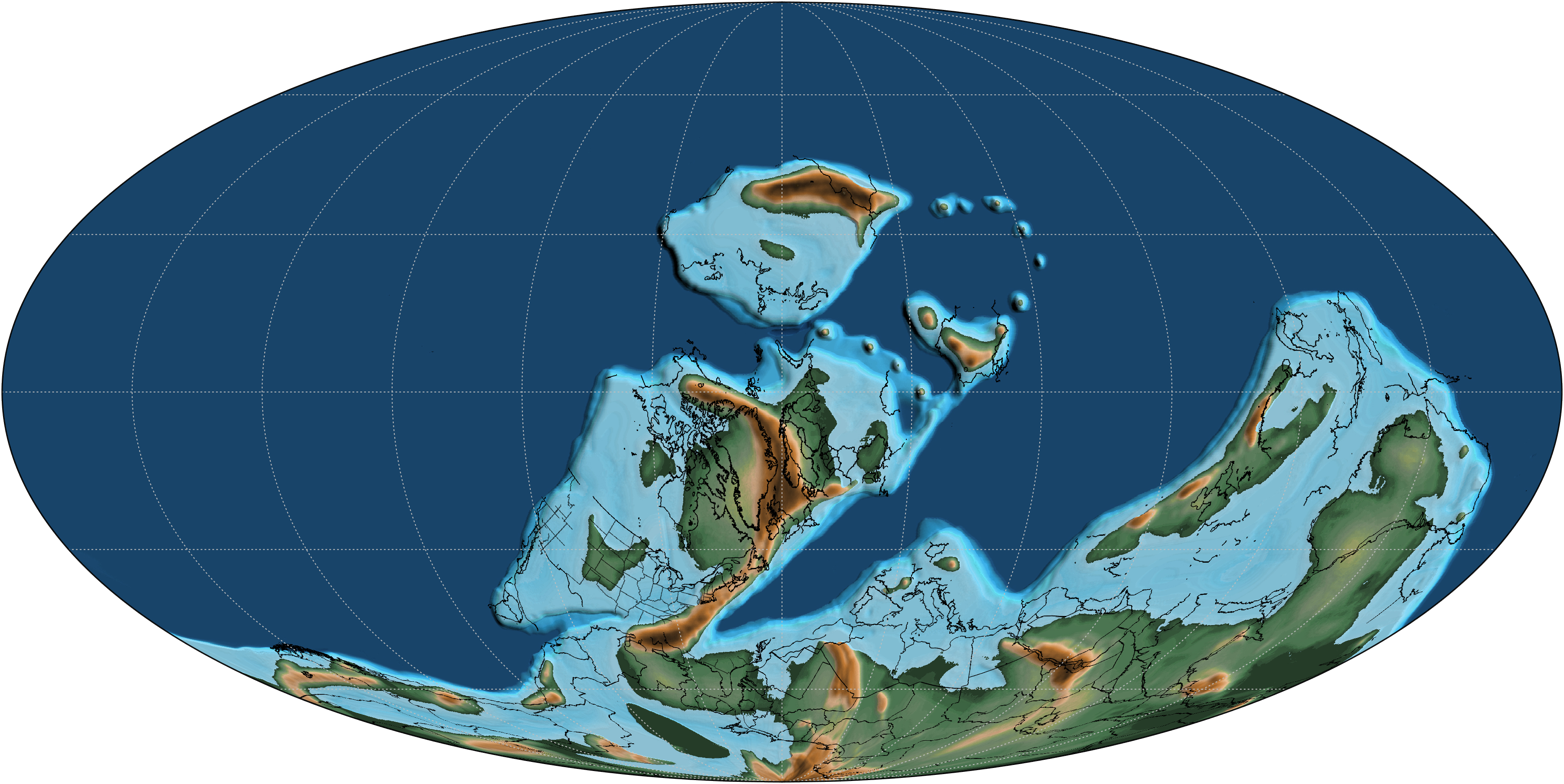
- Paleogeography of the Eifelian, 390 Ma

Chronology
← / Hangenberg event, Famennian glaciation; ← / Kellwasser event (Late Devonian mass extinction); ← / Widespread shrubs & trees; ← / Hunsrück fauna; ← / Rhynie chert
Subdivision of the Devonian according to the ICS, as of 2023; Vertical axis scale: Millions of years ago

Etymology
- Name formality: Formal

Usage information
- Celestial body: Earth
- Regional usage: Global (ICS)
- Time scale(s) used: ICS Time Scale

Definition
- Chronological unit: Age
- Stratigraphic unit: Stage
- Time span formality: Formal
- Lower boundary definition: FAD of the conodont Polygnathus costatus partitus
- Lower boundary GSSP: Wetteldorf Richtschnitt section, Wetteldorf, Eifel, Germany; 50.1496°N 6.4716°E
- Lower GSSP ratified: 1985
- Upper boundary definition: FAD of the conodont Polygnathus hemiansatus
- Upper boundary GSSP: Jebel Mech Irdane, Tafilalt, Morocco; 31.2374°N 4.3541°W
- Upper GSSP ratified: 1994

The Eifelian is the first of two faunal stages in the Middle Devonian Epoch. It lasted from 393.47 ± 0.99 million years ago to 387.95 ± 1.04 million years ago. It was preceded by the Emsian Stage and followed by the Givetian Stage.

North American subdivisions of the Eifelian Stage include Southwood, and part of Cazenovia (or Cazenovian).

== Name and definition ==
The Eifelian is named after the Eifel Mountains of Western Germany, which exposed the GSSP section at the Wetteldorf Richtschnitt outcrop. The base of the Eifelian is defined by the start of the Polygnathus partitus conodont zone. This layer lies within the Upper Heisdorf Formation, 1.9 metres (6.2 ft) below the base of the Lauch Formation.

== Major events ==
The earliest forest is known from the Eifelian stage. Cladoxylopsid trees including Calamophyton and other plants have formed the forest landscape in what is now England.

=== Extinctions ===
The end of the Eifelian was marked by a biological crisis known as the Kačák Event, a two-part interval of extinction which led to ecological turnover among ammonoids, conodonts, and other free-swimming animals. In deep marine waters, the event is indicated by anoxic black shales. There is evidence for a major pulse of transgression (sea level rise) and warming during the event.

Warming and sea level rise through the Eifelian and beyond would have had major effects on diversity, likely leading to the downfall of several marine biogeographic realms. The cool-water Malvinoxhosan Realm (MXR), on the northwest edge of Gondwana, was decimated as rising temperatures eliminated suitably temperate habitat. Fauna of the Eastern Americas Realm (EAR), which was restricted to a shallow basin in southwest Laurussia, were gradually replaced by aggressive cosmopolitan species of the Old World Realm (OWR), which invaded through a seaway cutting along a flooded continental arch on the western edge of Laurussia.
