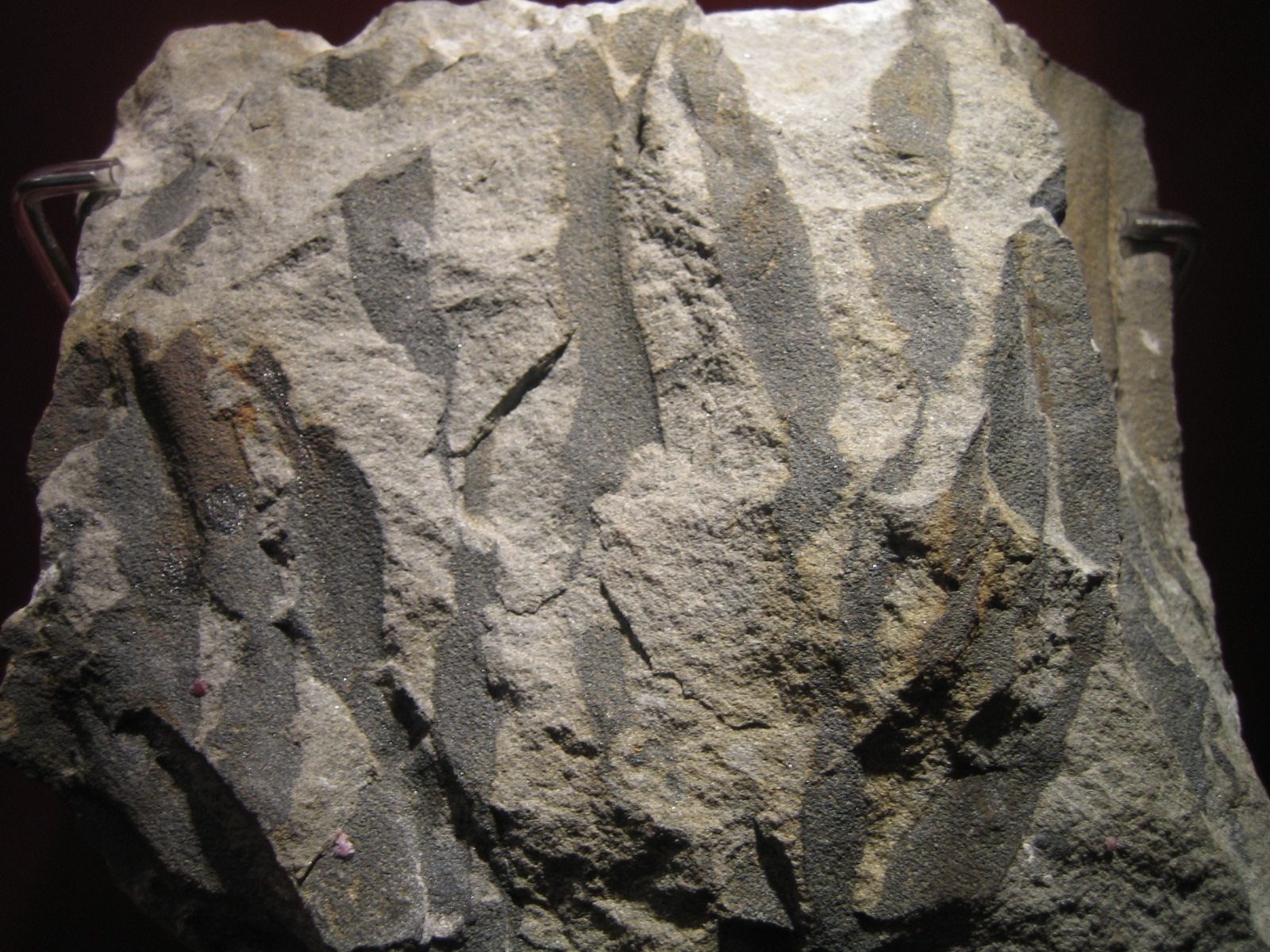
- W. givetiana

Scientific classification
- Kingdom: Plantae
- Clade: Tracheophytes
- Division: Pteridophyta (?)
- Class: †Cladoxylopsida
- Order: †Pseudosporochnales
- Genus: †Wattieza; Stockmans

Species
- W. givetiana Stockmans; W. casasii Berry

= Wattieza =

Wattieza Temporal range: Middle Devonian

Extinct genus of ferns

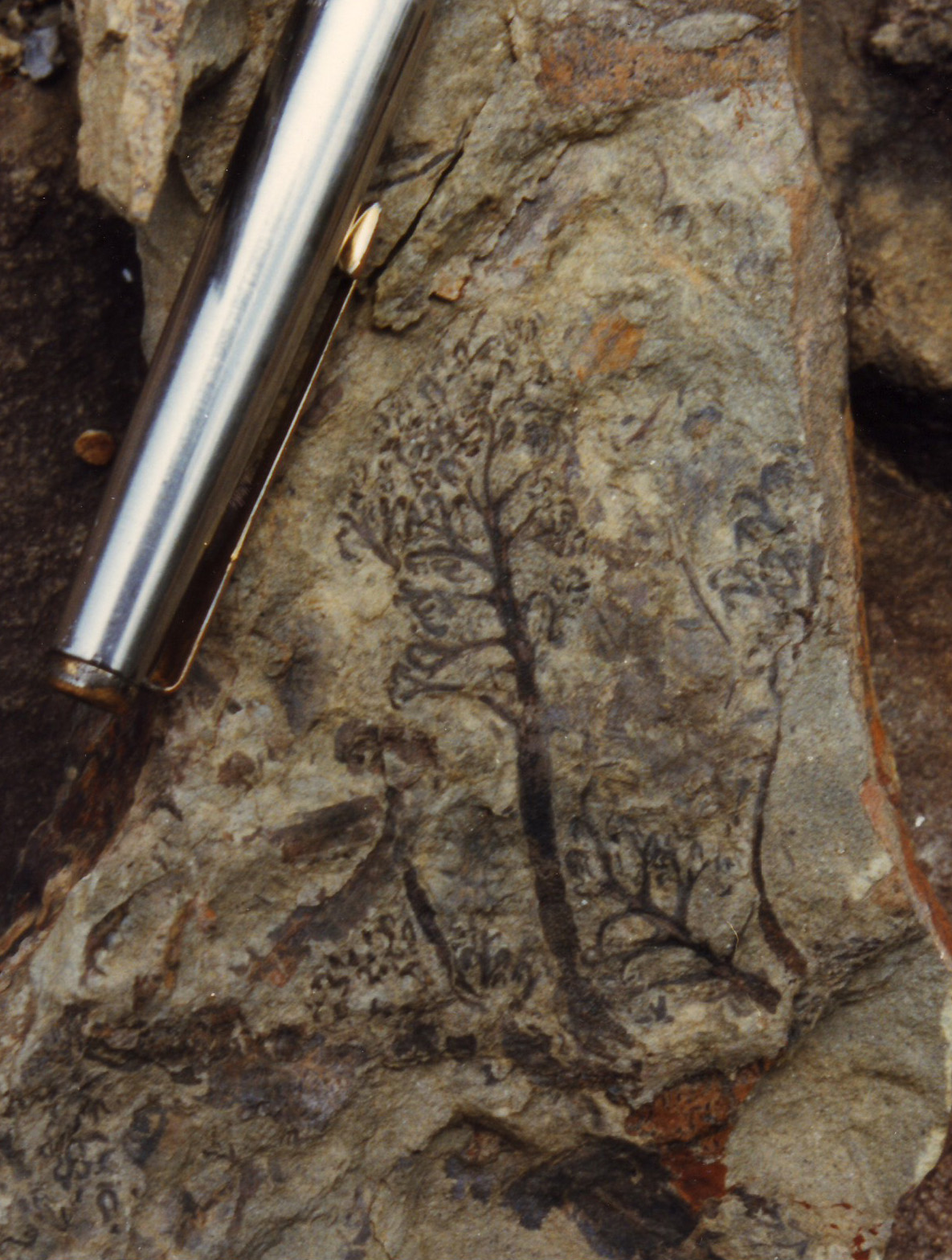
Wattieza casasii

Wattieza is a genus of prehistoric trees that existed in the mid-Devonian that belong to the cladoxylopsids, close relatives of the modern ferns and horsetails. The 2005 discovery (publicly revealed in 2007) in Schoharie County, New York, of fossils from the Middle Devonian about 385 million years ago united the crown of Wattieza to a root and trunk known since 1870. The fossilized grove of "Gilboa stumps" discovered at Gilboa, New York, were described as Eospermatopteris, though the complete plant remained unknown. These fossils have been described as the earliest known trees, standing 8 m (26 ft) or more tall, resembling the unrelated modern tree fern.

Wattieza had fronds rather than leaves, and they reproduced with spores.

Belgian paleobotanist François Stockmans described the species Wattieza givetiana in 1968 from fossil fronds collected from Middle Devonian strata in the London-Brabant Massif in Belgium.

English geologist and palaeobotanist Chris Berry described Wattieza casasii in Review of Paleobotany and Palynology No. 112 in 2000, based on fossil branches (13 slabs) and numerous other fragments (Berry, 2000) collected from middle-Givetian strata from the lower member of the Campo Chico Formation (Casas et al, 2022). The lithology of the lower member consists of dark grey to green mudstones and shales, interbedded with medium-coarse-grained sandstones close to the base of the Campo Chico Formation, in outcrops of the road to the Rio Socuy (Casas et al, 2022; pag 24), close to the Cano Colorado river, Perija Range, Zulia, Venezuela (Casas et al, 2022). The fossil material of Wattieza casasii is held at the National Museum Cardiff, Cardiff, Wales, and the palaeontological section of the Museo de Biologia at the University of Zulia, Maracaibo, Venezuela (Berry, 2000; p. 127). The name Wattieza casasii was assigned to the species in honor of Jhonny Casas, one of the discoverers of the original material (Berry, 2000; pag. 144).

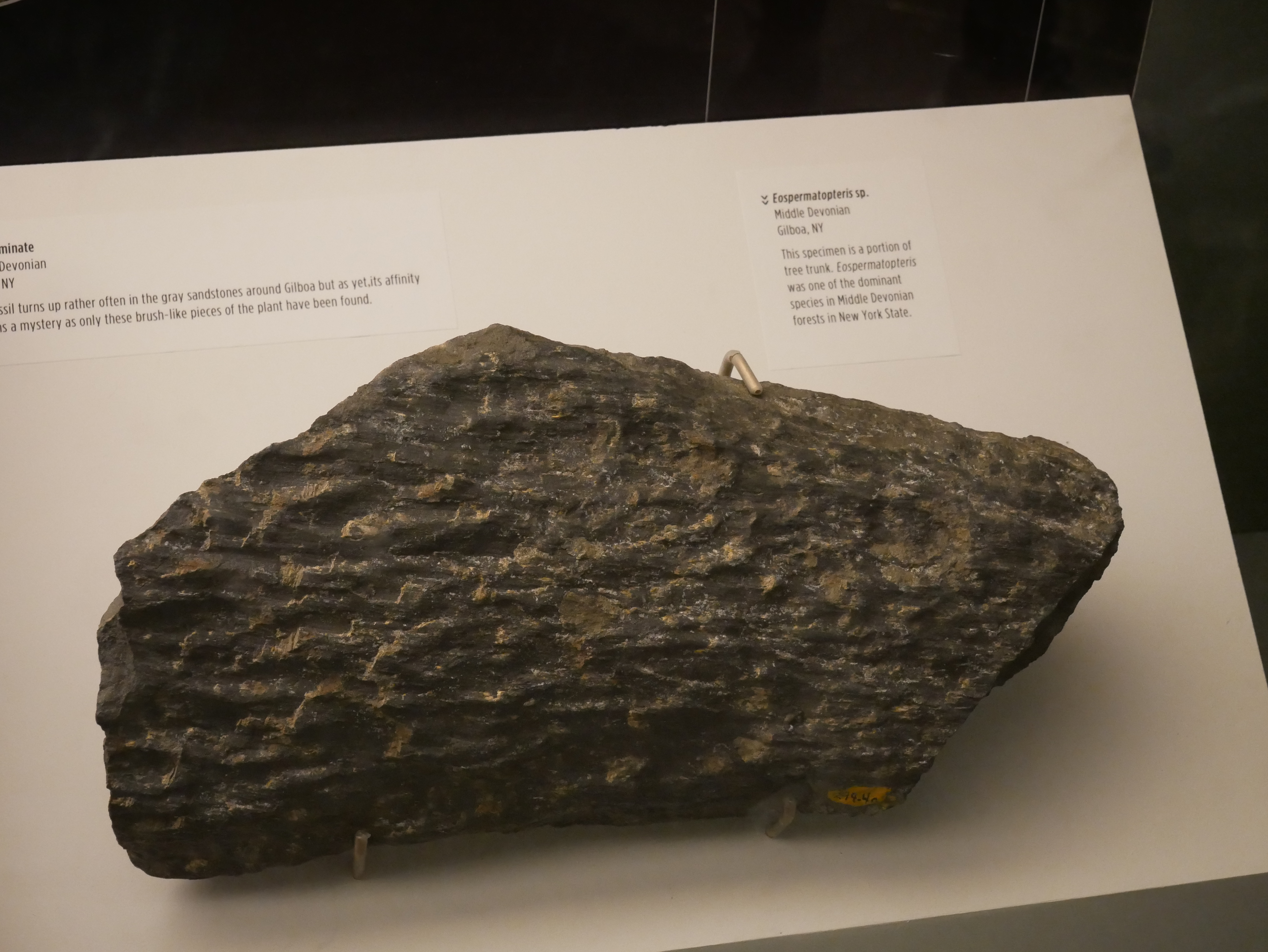
Trunk fragment
