= Tropical forest =

Generic forest in the tropics

Tropical forests are forested ecoregions with tropical climates – that is, land areas approximately bounded by the tropics of Cancer and Capricorn, but possibly affected by other factors such as prevailing winds.

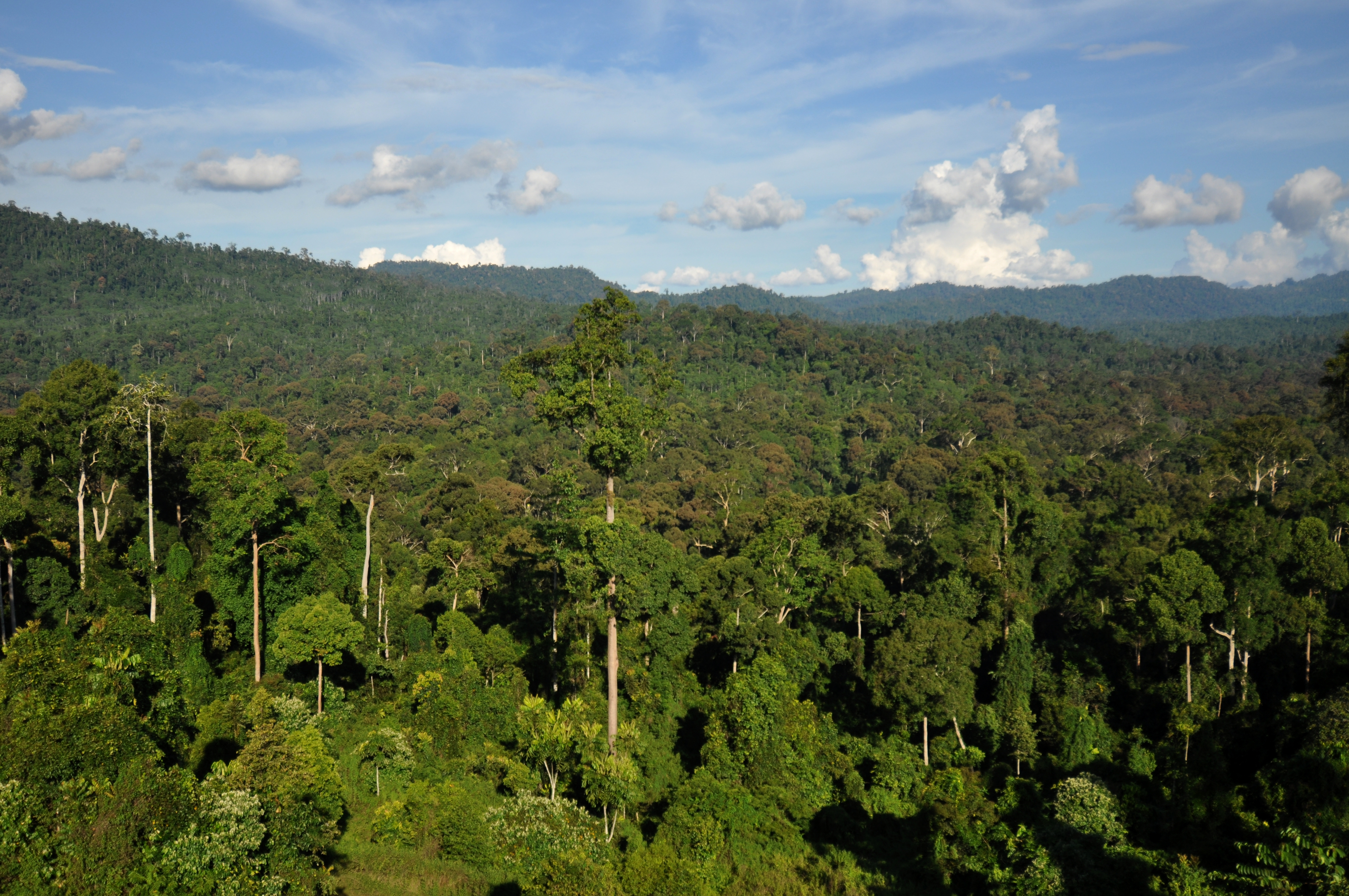
Borneo rainforest

Some tropical forest types are difficult to categorize. While forests in temperate areas are readily categorized on the basis of tree canopy density, such schemes do not work well in tropical forests. There is no single scheme that defines what a forest is, in tropical regions or elsewhere. Because of these difficulties, information on the extent of tropical forests varies between sources. However, tropical forests are extensive, making up just under half the world's forests. The tropical domain has the largest proportion of the world's forests (45 percent), followed by the boreal, temperate and subtropical domains.

More than 3.6 million hectares of virgin tropical forest was lost in 2018.

== History ==
The first tropical rainforests appeared during the Devonian, characterized mainly by Pseudosporochnalean and Archaeopteridalean plants. Other canopy forests expanded north-south of the equator during the Paleogene epoch, around 40 million years ago, as a result of the emergence of drier, cooler climates.

The tropical forest was originally identified as a specific type of biome in 1949.

== Types of tropical forest ==
Tropical forests are often thought of as evergreen rainforests and moist forests, but these account for only a portion of them (depending on how they are defined – see maps). The remaining tropical forests are a diversity of many different forest types including: Eucalyptus open forest, tropical coniferous forests, savanna woodland (e.g. Sahelian forest), and mountain forests (the higher elevations of which are cloud forests). Over even relatively short distances, the boundaries between these biomes may be unclear, with ecotones between the main types.

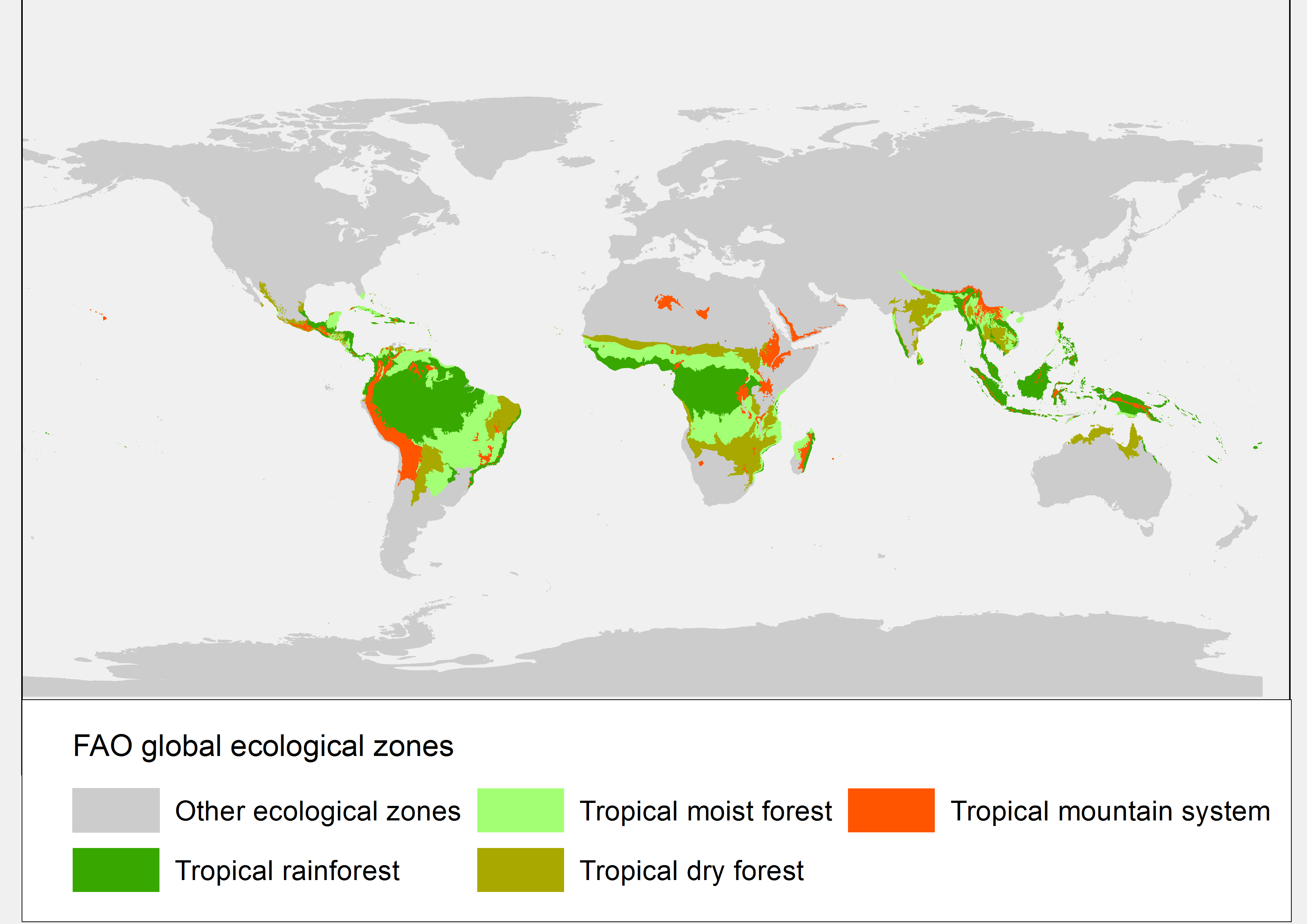
Tropical forest ecological zones (FAO)

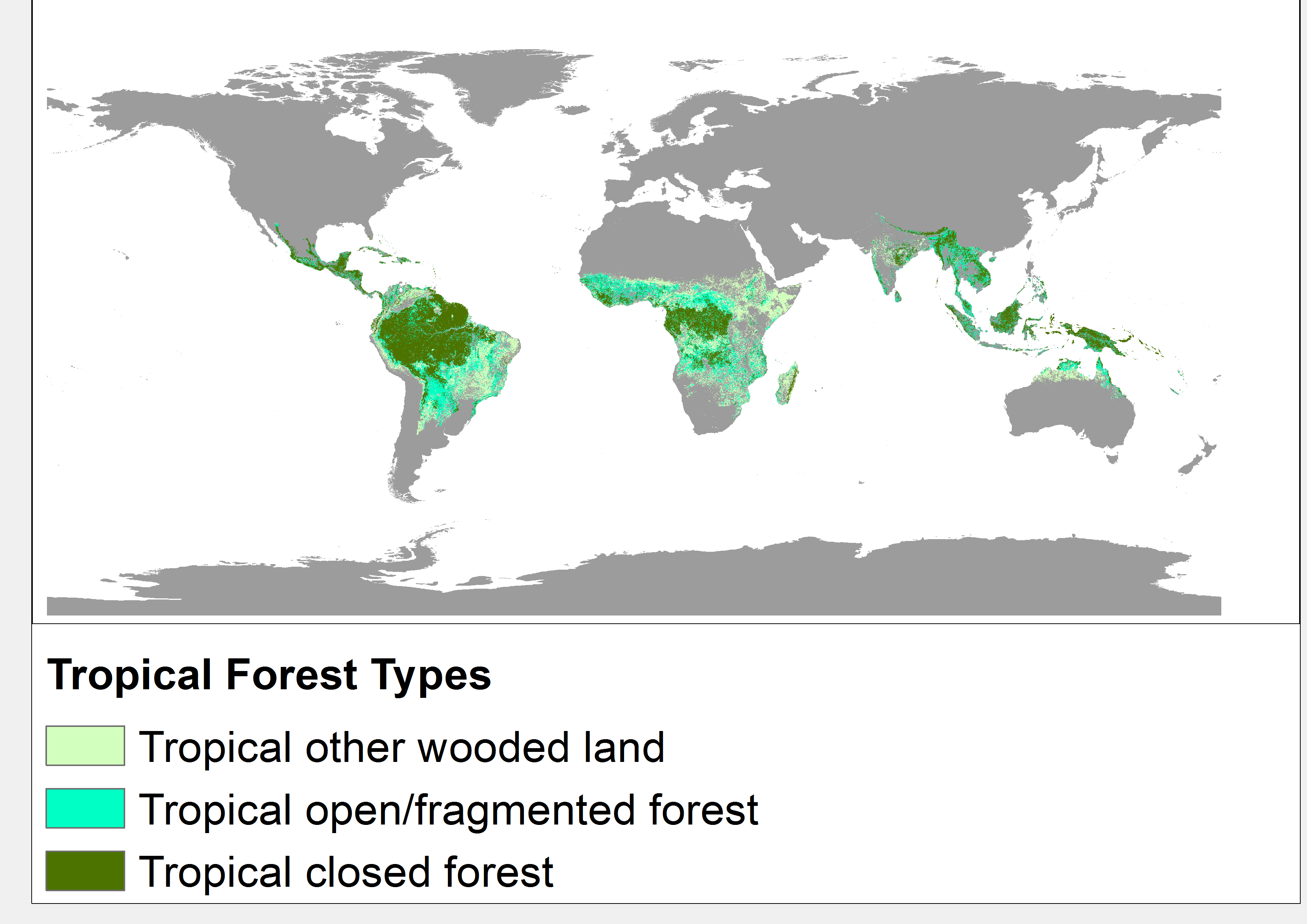
Tropical forest land from the UN FO FRA2000 report

Tropical climate sub-types (Köppen classification): Af—Tropical rainforest climate, Am—Tropical monsoon climate, Aw—Tropical savanna climate.

The nature of tropical forests in any given area is affected by several factors, most importantly:

- Geographical: location and climatic zone (see sub-types), with:
  - Temperature profile, which is relatively even in equatorial rainforest or with a cooler season towards subtropical latitudes;
  - Precipitation levels and seasonality, with strong dry seasons significantly affecting flora (e.g. the predominance of lianas);
  - Elevation affects the above, often creating "ecological islands" with high endemism (e.g. Mount Kinabalu in the Borneo rainforest).
- Historical: prehistoric age of forest and level of recent disturbance (see threats), changing primary (usually maximum biodiversity) into secondary forest, degenerating into bamboo forest after prolonged swidden agriculture (e.g. in several areas of Indo-China).
- Soil characteristics (also subject to various classifications): including depth and drainage.

=== The Global 200 scheme ===
The Global 200 scheme, promoted by the World Wildlife Fund, classifies three main tropical forest habitat types (biomes), grouping together tropical and sub-tropical areas (maps below):

- Tropical and subtropical coniferous forests.
- Tropical and subtropical dry broadleaf forests,
- Tropical and subtropical moist broadleaf forests,

Extent of tropical and sub-tropical -

coniferous forest regions

dry forest regions

moist forest regions

== Threats ==
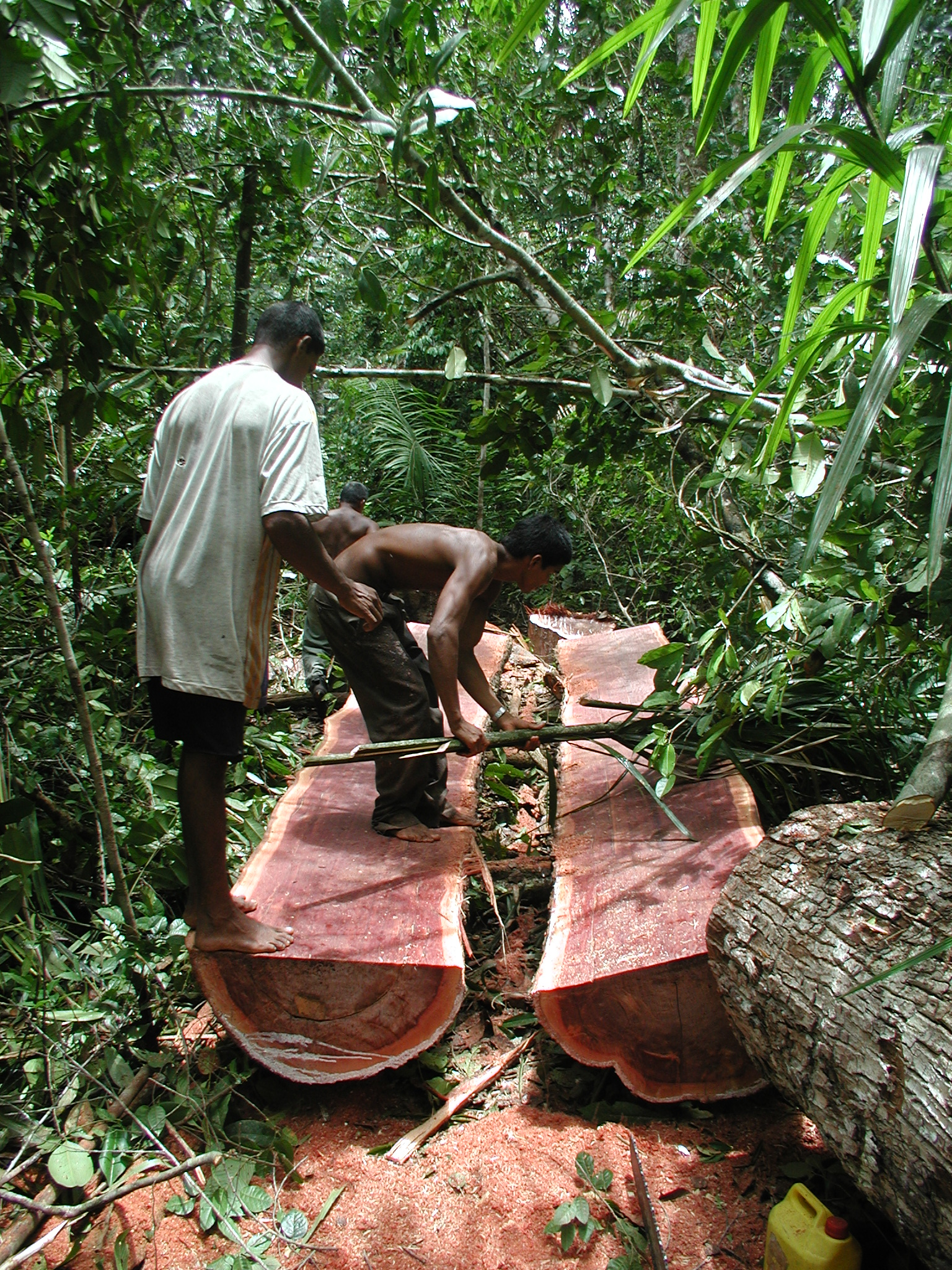
Guyanese log "bulletwood" near the Berbice River, Guyana

A number of tropical forests have been designated High-Biodiversity Wilderness Areas, but remain subject to a wide range of disturbances, including more localized pressures such as habitat loss and degradation and anthropogenic climate change.

Studies have also shown that ongoing climate change is increasing the frequency and intensity of some climate extremes (e.g. droughts, heatwaves and hurricanes) which, in combination with other local human disturbances, are driving unprecedented negative ecological consequences for tropical forests around the world. All tropical forests have experienced at least some levels of disturbance.

Current deforestation in the biodiversity hotspots of North and South America, sub-Saharan Africa, South-East Asia and the Pacific, can be attributed to export of commodities such as: beef, soy, coffee, cacao, palm oil, and timber; there is a requirement for "strong transnational efforts ... by improving supply chain transparency [and] public–private engagement".

A study in Borneo describes how, between 1973 and 2018, the old-growth forest had been reduced from 76% to 50% of the island, mostly due to fire and agricultural expansion. A widely-held view is that placing a value on the ecosystem services these forests provide may bring about more sustainable policies. However, clear monitoring and evaluation mechanisms for environmental, social and economic outcomes are needed.

For example, a study in Vietnam indicated that poor and inconsistent data combined with a lack of human resources and political interest (thus lack of financial support) are hampering efforts to improve forest land allocation and a Payments for Forest Environmental Services scheme.

== See also ==
- Gallery forest
- Jungle
- Primary forest
- Secondary forest
- Savanna
- Seasonal tropical forest
- Tropical rainforest
- Tropical vegetation

== Sources ==
- This article incorporates text from a free content work. Licensed under CC BY-SA 3.0 (license statement/permission). Text taken from Global Forest Resources Assessment 2020 Key findings, FAO, FAO.
