= Hermann Weyland =

German botanist and paleontologist (1888–1974)

Hermann Gerhard Weyland (25 March 1888 in Sankt Ingbert – 20 January 1974 in Wuppertal) was a German chemist and botanist. In collaboration with Richard Kräusel, he carried out significant paleobotanical investigations of Devonian flora.

He obtained his education at the University of Jena, receiving his doctorate in 1912 under the direction of Christian Ernst Stahl. Following graduation, he worked as assistant to Wilhelm Pfeffer at the University of Leipzig and under Ludwig Knorr in Jena. From 1915 to 1952 he worked as a chemist at Bayer in Wuppertal-Elberfeld, being named head of its physiology laboratory in 1924. In 1931 he became an honorary professor at the University of Cologne, where in 1945–48 he served as interim director of the botanical institute.

For a period of time, he served as chairman of the Naturwissenschaftlicher Verein Wuppertal. The fossil genus Weylandites commemorates his name.

== Selected works ==
- Zur Ernährungsphysiologie mykotropher Pflanzen, 1912 – On the nutrition physiology of mycotrophic plants.
- Beiträge zur kenntnis der Devonflora (with Richard Kräusel, 1923) – Contributions to the knowledge of Devonian flora.
- Die Flora des deutschen Unterdevons (with Richard Kräusel, 1930) – Flora of the German Lower Devonian.
- Beiträge zur Kenntis der rheinischen Tertiärflora, 1934 – Contributions to the knowledge of Rhenish Tertiary flora.
- Beiträge zur Kenntnis der rheinischen Tertiärflora / 1 Floren aus den Kieseloolith- und Braunkohlenschichten der niederrheinischen Bucht., 1934 – Contributions to Rhenish Tertiary flora / Flora from the Kieseloolith and lignite layers of the Lower Rhine.
- Neue Pflanzenfunde im Mitteldevon von Elberfeld (with Richard Kräusel, 1938) – New plant discoveries in the Middle Devonian at Elberfeld.
- Lehrbuch der Paläobotanik (with Walther Gothan, 1954) – Textbook of paleobotany.
