= Foozia =

Foozia Temporal range: Emsian

Scientific classification
- Kingdom: Plantae
- Clade: Tracheophytes
- Division: Pteridophyta (?)
- Class: †Cladoxylopsida
- Genus: †Foozia; P.Gerrienne
- Species: †F. minuta

Binomial name
- †Foozia minuta P.Gerrienne

Extinct genus of ferns

Foozia was a genus of vascular Emsian (Lower Devonian) land plant with a main axis and a number of branches that sub-divide at most once. Some of these bear oval to semicircular sporangia containing Dibolisporites echinaceus, whereas the sterile branches may represent an early foray into leaf-formation. The only known fossils herald from Belgium. It is currently unclassified.
