= Suzanne Leclercq =

Belgian scientist (1901-1994)

Suzanne Célina Marie Julie Joséphine Leclercq (28 March 1901 – 12 June 1994) was a Belgian paleobotanist and paleontologist known for her study of Devonian period plants. She was president of the Geological Society of Belgium from 1953 to 1954. She was a professor of stratigraphy and paleophytology at the University of Liège. She won a number of prizes including the François Crépin Triennial Prize, the Agathon De Potter Prize in 1953, and in 1958 the Henri Buttgenbach Prize.

== Biography ==
Leclercq was born in 1901 in Liège, her parents were Xavier Leclercq, an industrialist, and Julie Gustin. Leclercq earned her Ph.D. at the University of Liège. She worked in Belgium and made many trips to institutions in the United Kingdom to study their collections throughout her research career.

Leclercq was a member of many scientific and professional societies, including the Botanical Society of America, the Paleobotanical Society of India, and the Geological Society of Belgium, which she led from 1953 to 1954. Leclercq was a professor of stratigraphy and paleophytology at her alma mater throughout her career, though she conducted research at the British Museum, the Geological Survey in London, the University of Glasgow, University of Manchester, University College London, and the University of Cambridge. She is known for her study of Devonian period plants.

Leclercq won a number of awards during her career, including the Kerkhove d'Exaerde Prize for Science, the François Crépin Triennial Prize, awarded by the Royal Botanical Society of Belgium, the Agathon De Potter Prize in 1953, and in 1958 the Henri Buttgenbach Prize.

The standard author abbreviation Leclercq is used to indicate this person as the author when citing a botanical name.
