= Richard Kräusel =

German paleobotanist

Richard Oswald Karl Kräusel
- Born: August 29, 1890; Breslau, German Empire
- Died: November 25, 1966; Frankfurt am Main, West Germany
- Education: University of Breslau
- Known for: Studies of Devonian land plants, Tertiary angiosperm leaf cuticles
- Scientific career
- Fields: Paleobotany
- Workplaces: University of Frankfurt, Senckenberg Natural History Museum
- Doctoral advisor: Ferdinand Albin Pax
- Author abbrev. (botany): Kräusel

Richard Oswald Karl Kräusel (29 August 1890 in Breslau – 25 November 1966 in Frankfurt am Main) was a German paleobotanist.

He studied botany at the University of Breslau as a pupil of Ferdinand Albin Pax, and in 1913 received his doctorate with the thesis Beiträge zur kenntnis der Holzer aus der schlesischen Braunkohle ("On wood from Silesian lignite"). From 1920 to 1952 he worked as a lecturer and professor at the University of Frankfurt. He was also associated with the Senckenberg Natural History Museum in Frankfurt, where he served as head of the department of paleobotany. During World War II his collections of fossil plants were stored in a nearby castle for safekeeping; unfortunately these collections were destroyed during bombing raids on Frankfurt.

During his career, he traveled worldwide in his investigations of fossil plants — Southeast Asia (1921, 1926), South America (1924, 1947, 1956/57), United States and Canada (1928, 1959), South-West Africa (1928, 1953–54) and India (1960/61, 1964). On his later journeys, he conducted research on flora of Gondwanaland and collected fossil specimens to replace those that were previously destroyed. In Europe, he carried out studies of Mesozoic flora of southern Germany, Austria and Switzerland.

With Hermann Weyland, he carried out important research on land plants of the Devonian. He is also remembered for his analysis of Tertiary angiosperm leaf cuticles.

== Selected works ==
- Beiträge zur Kenntnis der Kreideflora, 1922 – Contributions to knowledge of the Cretaceous flora.
- Beiträge zur Kenntnis der Devonflora, (with Hermann Weyland, 1923) – Contributions to knowledge of the Devonian flora.
- Die paläobotanischen Untersuchungsmethoden, ein Leitfaden für die Untersuchung fossiler Pflanzen sowie der aus ihnen aufgebauten Gesteine in Gelände und Laboratorium, 1929 – Paleobotanical investigation methods. A guide to the study of fossil plants, etc.
- Die Flora des deutschen Unterdevons (with Hermann Weyland, 1930) – Flora of the German Lower Devonian.
- Neue Pflanzenfunde im Rheinischen Unterdevon (with Hermann Weyland, 1935 – New botanical findings of the Rhenish Lower Devonian.
- Versunkene Floren; eine Einführung in die Paläobotanik, 1960.
- Mitteleuropäische Pflanzenwelt. Sträucher und Bäume, (with Heinrich Nothdurft, Hermann Merxmüller, 1960) – Central European plants, shrubs and trees.
