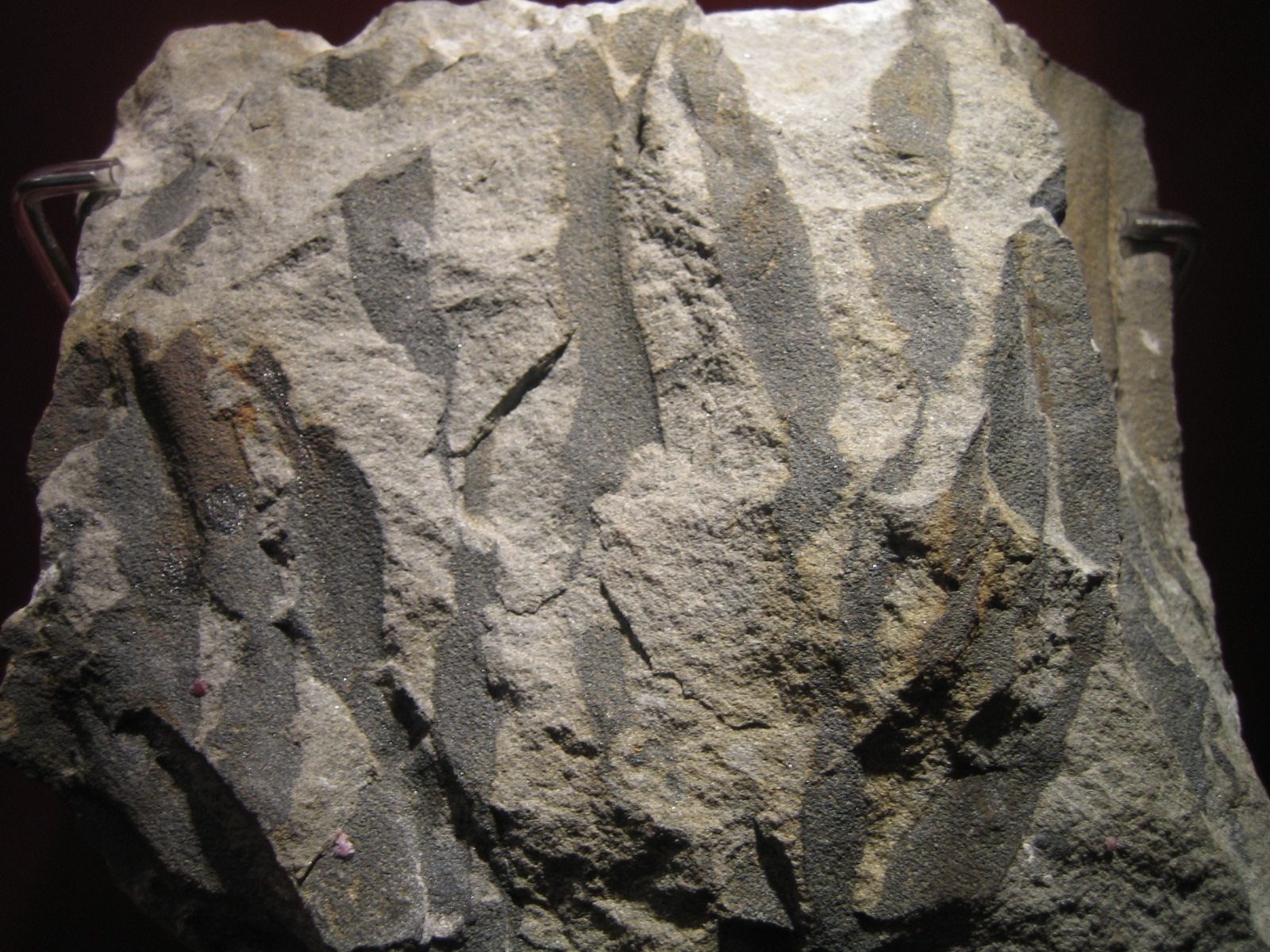
- Eospermatopteris erianus

Scientific classification
- Kingdom: Plantae
- Clade: Embryophytes
- Clade: Tracheophytes
- Division: Pteridophyta (?)
- Class: †Cladoxylopsida
- Order: †Pseudosporochnales

Genera
- †Calamophyton †Cladoxylon †Duisbergia †Eospermatopteris †Hierogramma †Hyenia †Lorophyton †Pietzschia †Polypetalophyton †Polyxylon †Pseudosporochnus †Rhymokalon †Stenoxylon †Wattieza †Xenocladia

= Pseudosporochnales =

Pseudosporochnales Temporal range: Devonian–Early Carboniferous

Extinct order of ferns

Pseudosporochnales is an order of the extinct cladoxylopsids. It contains the Hyeniales.
