= Henry Nathaniel Andrews =

American paleontologist

- Born: June 15, 1910; Melrose, Massachusetts
- Died: March 3, 2002 (aged 91); Concord, New Hampshire
- Known for: Paleozoic plant evolution
- Scientific career
- Fields: Paleobotany
- Institutions: University of Connecticut; Washington University in St. Louis; Missouri Botanical Garden

Henry Nathaniel Andrews, Jr. (born June 15, 1910, Melrose, Massachusetts; d. March 3, 2002 Concord, New Hampshire) was an American paleobotanist recognized as an expert in plants of the Devonian and Carboniferous periods. He was a fellow of the Geological Society of America and the American Association for the Advancement of Science and was elected into the U.S. National Academy of Sciences in 1975. He was a professor at the Washington University in St. Louis from 1940 to 1964 and a paleobotanist at the Missouri Botanical Garden 1947 to 1964. From 1964 until his retirement 1975, Andrews worked at the University of Connecticut, where he served as head of the school's Botany department and later as head of the Systematics and Environmental Section.
