= Middle Devonian =

Second epoch of the Devonian period

- 393.47 ± 0.99 – 382.31 ± 1.36 Ma
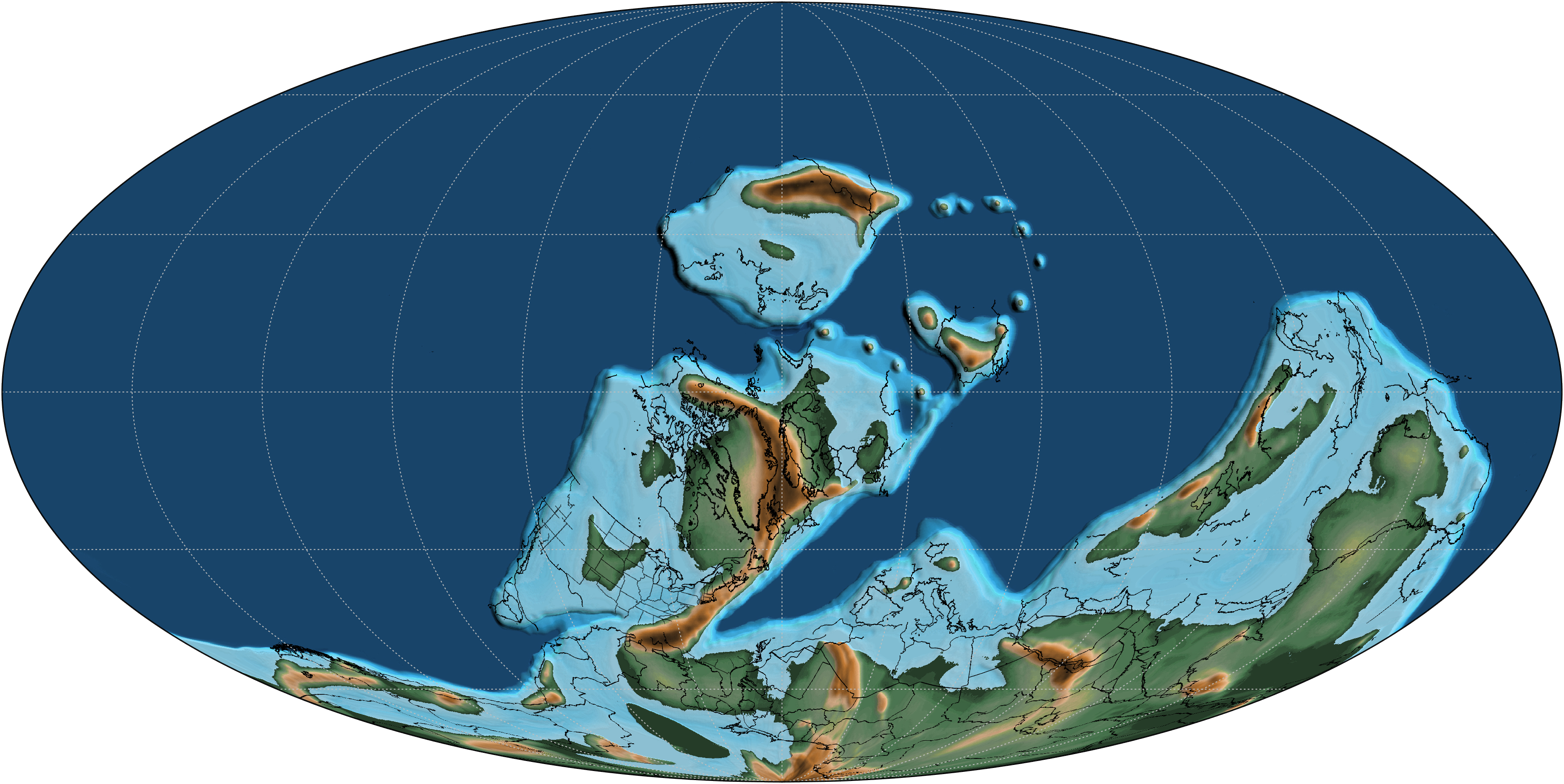
- A map of Earth as it appeared 390 million years ago during the Middle Devonian Epoch, Eifelian Age

Chronology
← / Hangenberg event, Famennian glaciation; ← / Kellwasser event (Late Devonian mass extinction); ← / Widespread shrubs & trees; ← / Hunsrück fauna; ← / Rhynie chert
Subdivision of the Devonian according to the ICS, as of 2024; Vertical axis scale: Millions of years ago

Etymology
- Name formality: Formal

Usage information
- Celestial body: Earth
- Regional usage: Global (ICS)
- Time scale(s) used: ICS Time Scale

Definition
- Chronological unit: Epoch
- Stratigraphic unit: Series
- Time span formality: Formal
- Lower boundary definition: Fad of the Conodont Polygnathus costatus partitus
- Lower boundary GSSP: Wetteldorf Richtschnitt, Eifel hills, Germany; 50.1496°N 6.4716°E
- Lower GSSP ratified: 1985
- Upper boundary definition: FAD of the Conodont Ancyrodella rotundibola
- Upper boundary GSSP: Col du Puech de la Suque, Montagne Noire, France; 43.5032°N 3.0868°E
- Upper GSSP ratified: 1986

In the geological timescale, the Middle Devonian epoch (from 393.47 ± 0.99 million years ago to 382.31 ± 1.36 million years ago) occurred during the Devonian period, after the end of the Emsian age.

The Middle Devonian epoch is subdivided into two stages: Eifelian and Givetian.

== Life in the Middle Devonian ==
In the Middle Devonian the armored jawless fish known as ostracoderms were declining in diversity and instead the jawed fish were thriving and increasing in diversity in both the oceans and freshwater. The shallow, warm, oxygen-depleted waters of Devonian inland lakes, surrounded by primitive plants, provided the environment necessary for certain early fish to develop essential characteristics such as well developed lungs, ability to crawl out of the water and onto the land for short periods of time, possibly in search of food which would be developed by the tetrapods later in the Late Devonian which are descendents of these early fish.

The earliest forest grew in the Middle Devonian (Eifelian) time. This new environment was formed by cladoxylopsid trees including Calamophyton.

The Taghanic event took place near the end of the Middle Devonian.
