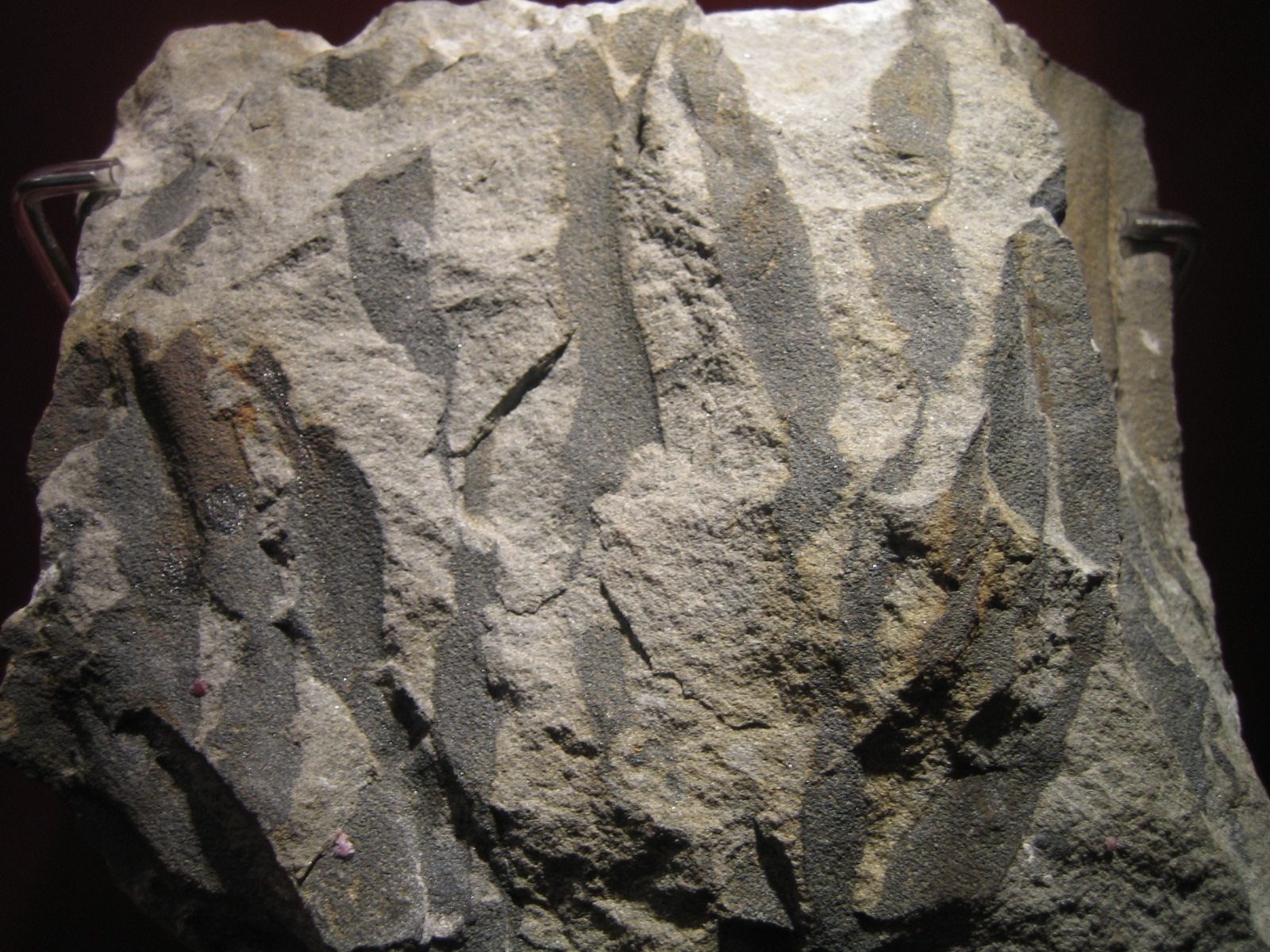
- Wattieza

Scientific classification
- Kingdom: Plantae
- Clade: Tracheophytes
- Division: Pteridophyta (?)
- Class: †Cladoxylopsida; Novák (1930)

Orders
- †Cladoxylales; †Hyeniales; †Iridopteridales; †Pseudosporochnales; ?†Foozia; †Panxia

= Cladoxylopsida =

Cladoxylopsida Temporal range: Middle Devonian–Early Carboniferous

Extinct class of ferns

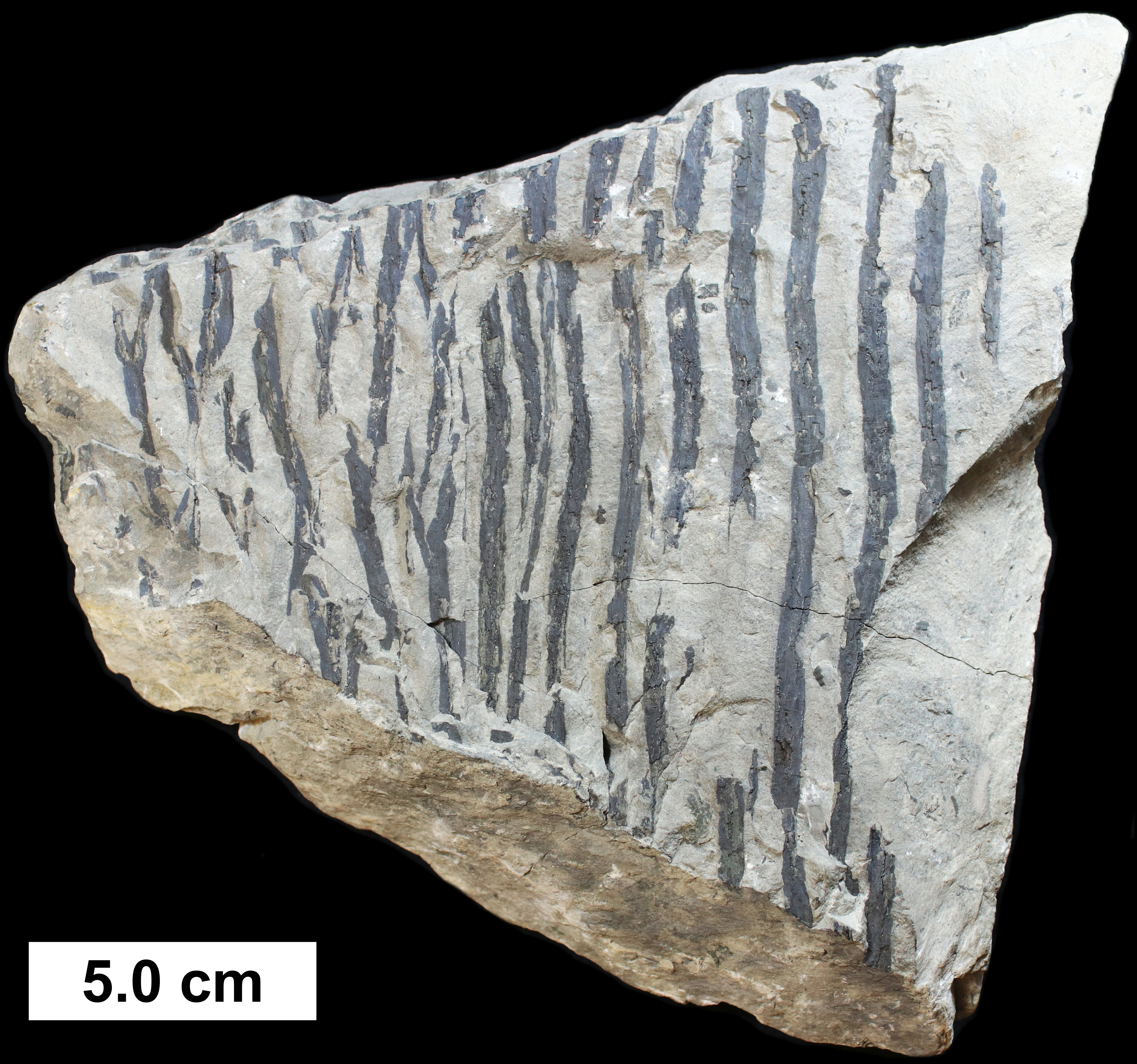
Bark (possibly from a cladoxylopsid) from the Middle Devonian of Wisconsin

The cladoxylopsids are an extinct group of plants related to ferns and sphenopsids.

They had a central trunk, from the top of which several lateral branches were attached. Fossils of these plants originate in the Middle Devonian to Early Carboniferous periods (around 390 to 320 million years ago), mostly just as stems.

Cladoxylopsida contains two orders. The order Hyeniales is now included in Pseudosporochnales.

Intact fossils of the Middle Devonian cladoxylopsid Wattieza show it to have been a tree, the earliest identified in the fossil record as of 2007. In 2019, experts from Cardiff University, UK; Binghamton University and the New York State Museum discovered more fossils of Cladoxylopsida and Archaeopteris in a quarry in Cairo, New York.

A 2017 discovery in Xinjiang in China of early Late Devonian (Frasnian, ca. 374 Ma) silicified fossil cladoxylopsid tree trunks (diameter up to c.70 cm) with preserved cellular anatomy showed an internal arrangement with many xylem bundles in the outer part and none in the interior; each bundle was surrounded by its own cambium layer. All cladoxylopsid species of a tree size appeared to be hollow in the middle, and their trunk developed a secondary growth by increasing the size of the individual xylem bundles, which would split and tear the trunk as it was growing and getting wider, forcing the tree to repair itself to accommodate the growth.
