= Geological history of North America =

The geological history of North America comprises the history of geological occurrences and emergence of life in North America during the interval of time spanning from the formation of the Earth through to the emergence of humanity and the start of prehistory. At the start of the Paleozoic Era, what is now "North" America was actually in the Southern Hemisphere. Marine life flourished in the country's many seas, although terrestrial life had not yet evolved. During the latter part of the Paleozoic, seas were largely replaced by swamps home to amphibians and early reptiles. When the continents had assembled into Pangaea, drier conditions prevailed. The evolutionary precursors to mammals dominated the country until a mass extinction event ended their reign.

The Triassic, the first period of the Mesozoic Era, followed. Dinosaurs evolved and began their rise to dominance, quickly spreading into the United States. Soon, Pangaea began to split up and North America began drifting north and westward. During the latter Jurassic, the floodplains of the western states were home to dinosaurs like Allosaurus, Apatosaurus, and Stegosaurus. During the Cretaceous, the Gulf of Mexico expanded until it split North America in half. Plesiosaurs and mosasaurs swam in its waters. Later into the period, it began to withdraw and the coastal plains of the western states were home to dinosaurs like Edmontosaurus, Triceratops, and Tyrannosaurus. Another mass extinction ended the reign of the dinosaurs.

The Cenozoic Era began afterward. The inland sea of the Cretaceous gradually vanished and mammals were beginning to dominate the land. During the Eocene, the western states were home to small primitive camels and horses as well as the carnivorous creodonts. Soon, mammals had entered the oceans and the early whale Basilosaurus swam the coastal waters of the southeast. Rhinoceros-like titanotheres dominated Oligocene South Dakota. From this point on, the climate in the United States cooled until the Pleistocene, when glaciers spread. Saber-toothed cats, woolly mammoths, mastodons, and dire wolves roamed the land. Humans arrived across a land bridge between Siberia and Alaska and may have played a role in hunting these animals into extinction.

== Precambrian ==
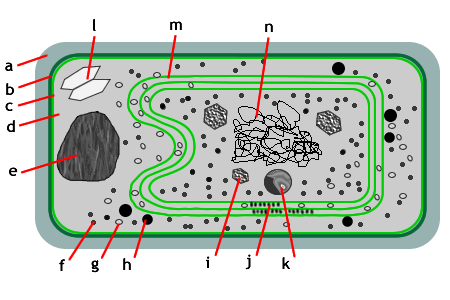
Blue-green alga

The oldest known eukaryotes lived around 1.4 billion years ago during the Precambrian near Beck Spring in California. These were photosynthetic organisms and produced oxygen as a byproduct of their physiology. The Beck Spring eukaryotes and other Precambrian photosynthesizers released the oxygen that now makes the planet's atmosphere breathable. Precambrian cyanobacteria remains from this age were preserved between Copper Harbor and Eagle Harbor on the shoreline of Lake Superior in the Upper Peninsula of Michigan. The appearance of the first eukaryotic cells in the fossil record were relatively followed by evidence of complex multicellular life. Rocks in Nevada dating back to a billion years ago preserve trace fossils left behind by worms as they burrowed below the sediment. Other complex Precambrian life forms were preserved in North Carolina and Arizona.

== Paleozoic ==
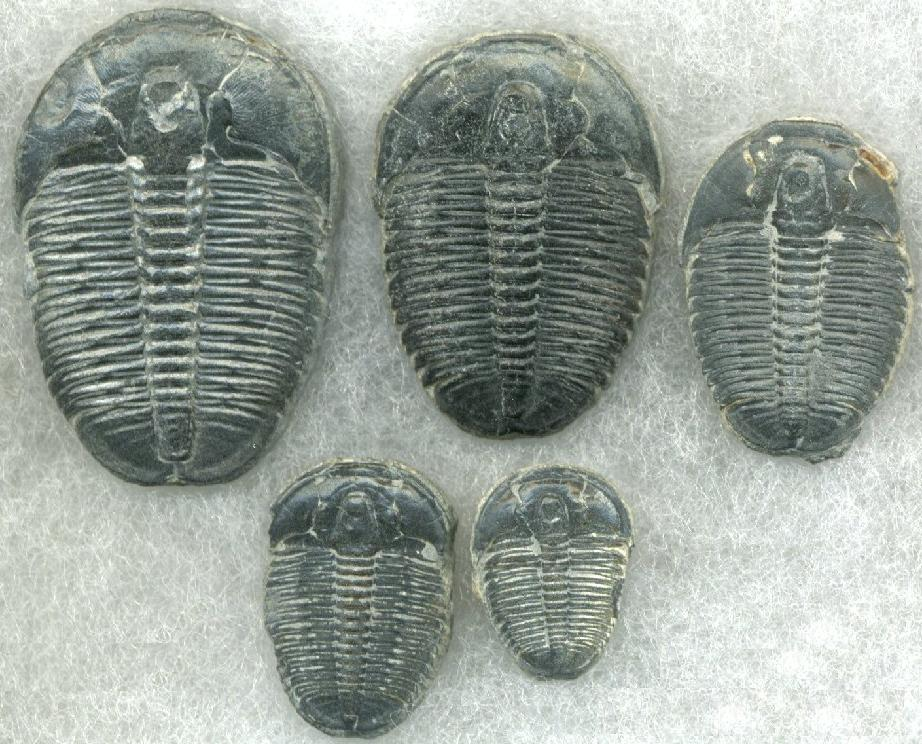
Elrathia.

The Phanerozoic eon began following the Precambrian. The first major unit of time it contained was the Cambrian period of the Paleozoic era. At the time, Earth's continents were in a very different arrangement and were generally smaller than they are today. The southeastern part of the US was connected to South America and Africa and located in the polar latitudes of the southern hemisphere. The western states were located near the equator.

All known life during the Cambrian was aquatic so areas of the United States above sea level would have been sterile wastelands. Trilobites are the most common kind of animal in the Cambrian fossil record. Especially notable are the Elrathia of the Antelope Springs region of Utah. Sponge-like archaeocyathids were common in Nevada. Brachiopods, gastropods, and sponges were also important Cambrian animals. Sea levels around North America dropped at the end of the Cambrian. Ecosystems in shallow water probably devastated. The Cambrian ended with a mass extinction. Globally, brachiopods and gastropods lost much of their biodiversity, sponges lost about half of their families and almost three quarters of contemporary trilobite families vanished at the same time.

Much of the continent would be submerged when the sea finally rose again. The most common animal in the Ordovician fossil record seems to have been brachiopods. Large numbers flourished and were preserved in great detail near Cincinnati during the Middle Ordovician. Members of this fauna were preserved in Indiana, Kentucky, and Ohio. Most known Ordovician trilobites are distinct from their Cambrian forebears as the few taxa surviving the mass extinction diversified once again. During the Middle Ordovician, early armored jawless fish called ostracoderms left behind fragmentary shards of bone in what is now the Rocky Mountains region. Late in the Ordovician sea levels dropped. Another mass extinction marked the end of the Ordovician. Globally, 25% of families disappeared. Major losses were experienced by brachiopods, fishes, echinoids, sponges and trilobites. This mass extinction was also most damaging to trilobites, which lost 50% of their families.

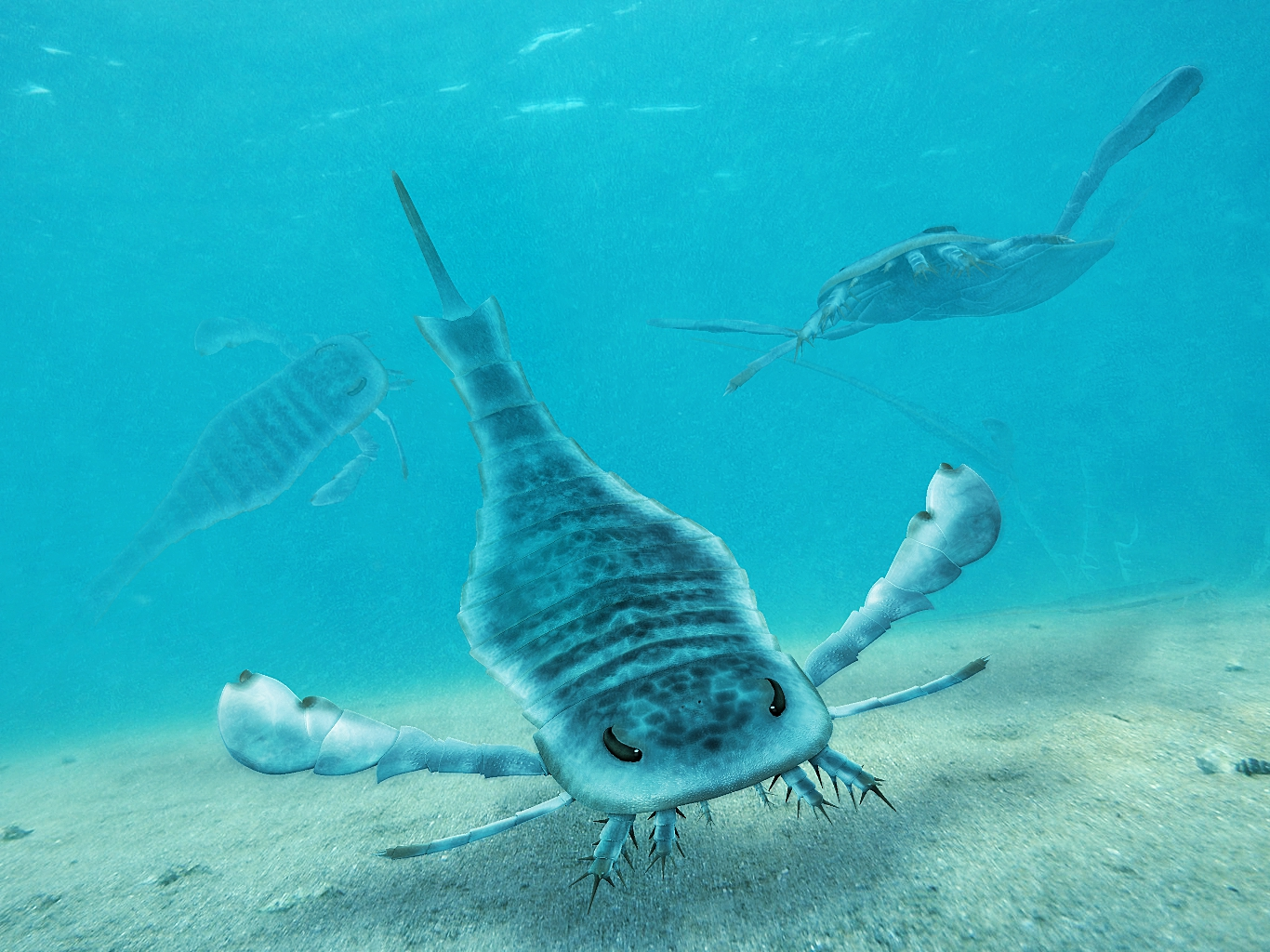
Eurypterus

During the Silurian, warm, shallow seas covered most of North America. Illinois, Indiana, and Michigan were home to vast coral reefs. The reefs of Indiana in particular are among the most diverse of the period on the entire continent. The southeastern United States were still part of Gondwanaland during the Silurian. Graptolites still inhabited the waters near the eastern coast of the United States but were not as big a component of the Silurian fauna as they used to be during the Ordovician. As the Silurian progressed the seas covering most of the country would retreat. Only the Michigan and New York areas (then near the equator) were still inundated. However, these landlocked seas were not being replenished by freshwater and so gradually evaporated, leaving concentrated salt deposits in those regions.

Devonian North America once again was home to seas that teemed with life. In fact Devonian marine life may have been more abundant and diverse than at any other point in the Paleozoic. Glass sponges became abundant in western New York during the Devonian. Especially notable are the marine fossils of Cuyahoga County, Ohio, which was home to more than 120 kinds of marine life. The local fishes alone left behind more than 50,000 fossils. During the Late Devonian the oldest known seed-bearing plants grew in Pennsylvania. The plants responsible for leaving behind the local fossil seeds may have been seed ferns, plants whose fronds resemble ferns but who reproduce through seeds instead of spores. Gilboa Forest, among the first in the world, formed in New York around this time. The Devonian ended with another mass extinction. Globally, 25% of families were lost. Nearly every family of ammonoids, fishes, and amphibians became extinct. Most known families of coral and trilobite became extinct. Other taxa to suffer declines in diversity include brachiopods, bryozoans, crinoids, and ostracodes.

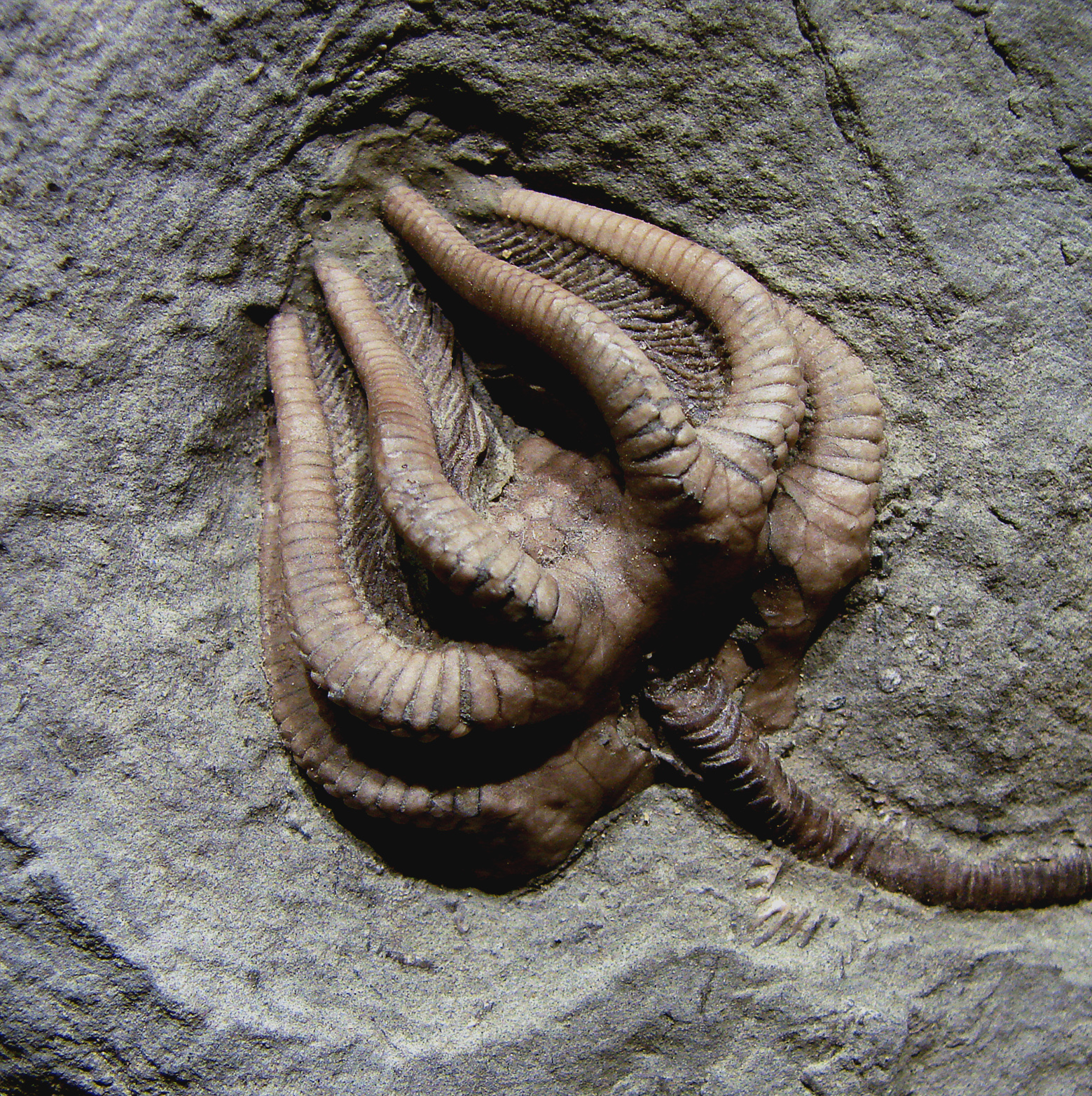
Agaricocrinus

The ensuing Mississippian has been nicknamed the Age of Crinoids because this group left behind such abundant fossils. Other common lifeforms include their relatives the blastoids. The pinhead-sized foraminiferan Endothyra fed on seafloor detritus and was extremely abundant during the Mississippian. Some limestones in Illinois and Missouri that formed at this time are almost entirely composed of its remains. Few fossils of terrestrial life are known from the Mississippian of North America.

During the ensuing Pennsylvanian, the northward drift of Gondwanaland finally joined the southeastern United States to North America as Pangaea began to form. Mountain building raised the Ancestral Rockies in Colorado, Utah, and Wyoming. Seawaters left the interior of the country. Densely vegetated swamps were widespread. The largest insects in geologic history lived during the Pennsylvanian. Giant salamander-like amphibians left behind footprints near Lawrence, Kansas that would later fossilize. Fossil footprints from this time period were also preserved in eastern states like Alabama, Georgia, West Virginia, Ohio, and Pennsylvania where Carboniferous fossil footprints are known.

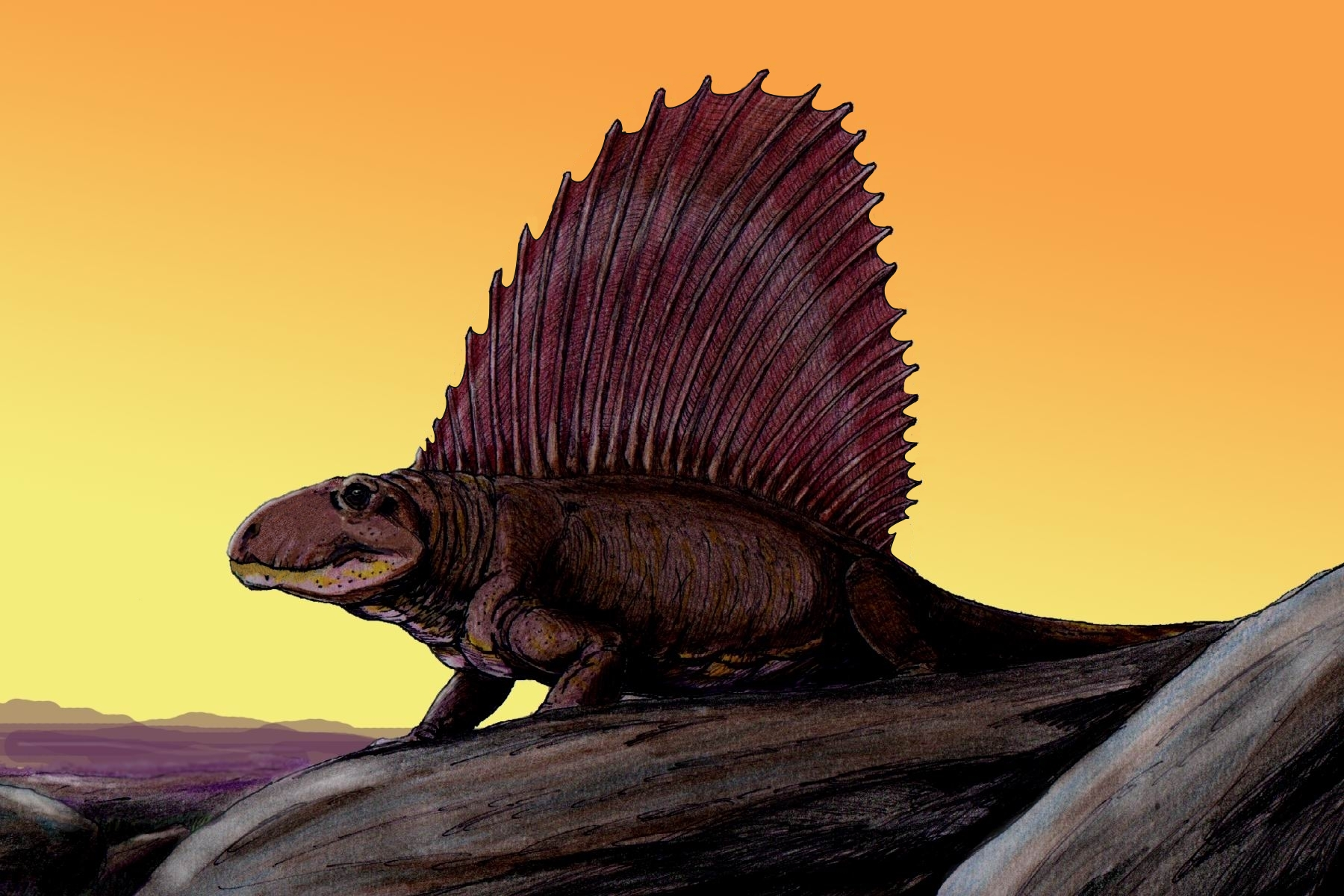
Dimetrodon

The world's continents were joined as Pangaea throughout all of the Permian. Volcanic activity occurred on the west coast. Seas were present in the southwest and west coast. The seas of Texas were home to massive reefs made of spined brachiopods jumbled together. Seas that had previously covered Kansas, New Mexico and Texas began drying up and left behind salt deposits. The inner portions of the western United States had a hot dry climate. Sand dunes were common throughout the country. The insects of the Permian were common and diverse, but smaller than those of the Pennsylvanian. An example of this bounty were the twenty different orders preserved at a site called Insect Hill near Elmo, Kansas. Massive amphibians were not rare in the southwestern United States but were unable to stray too far from bodies of water. Seymouria was a twenty inch long transitional form documenting the origin of reptiles from their amphibian-like forebears from Texas. Reptiles were becoming common during the Permian. Texas was also home to the pelycosaurs Dimetrodon and Edaphosaurus. Late in the Permian therapsids became the dominant large-bodied terrestrial vertebrates. These were the precursors of mammals.

The Permian ended with the most destructive mass extinction in all of Earth's history. Globally up to 96% of all species may have disappeared. Rugose and tabulate corals became extinct. The cryptostome and trepostome bryozoans also became extinct at this time despite their long history of diversity and abundance earlier in the Paleozoic. Brachiopods suffered greatly and never regained their previous numbers or variety. Ammonoids lost all but one family. Eurypterids and trilobites became extinct. Blastoids became extinct. Crinoids lost all but one family. The echinoids just squeaked past; only one genus is known to have survived. Typical survivors were small detritivores and sediments feeders. The worst losses were among filter feeders and carnivores.

== Mesozoic ==
Map of Pangaea with modern continents outlined

The eastern United States was part of Pangaea's interior for most of the Triassic Period of the Mesozoic era. At the time, the area lay close to the equator and was connected to western Europe and Africa. The union of all of Earth's continents into a single land mass changed the way the atmosphere and oceans circulated. This left what is now the eastern US with a hot climate and pronounced seasons. Much of the country was located at about 30 latitudinal degrees North, where there tends to be high atmospheric pressures and little precipitation. The western United States were largely covered in seawater during the Late Triassic. Mountain building and volcanic activity were ongoing in the same region.

The Triassic saw the Earth's biosphere recovering from the end-Permian mass extinction. After the Permian mass extinction, ammonoids were one of the first groups of marine invertebrates to become abundant and diverse again. During the Middle Triassic the scleractinian corals typical of modern oceans appeared. During the Triassic, corals were rare in North America. Nevertheless, some were present on the west coast, although these corals did not congregate into reefs. Ichthyosaurs were one of the most important groups of marine reptiles during the Triassic. Important ichthyosaur fossils of this age were preserved in Nevada.

On land, North America's vegetation included plants like conifers, cycads, ferns, ginkgoes, and horsetails. The Triassic vegetation of the east coast indicated swampy conditions in the local rift valleys. Arizona was home to a great forest that would later leave behind the area's famous petrified wood. Reptiles first began claiming the ecological dominance of marine, terrestrial and aerial habitats during the Triassic that would earn the Mesozoic the nickname "the Age of Reptiles".

The Late Triassic also saw the origin of the dinosaurs. Dinosaurs left behind abundant fossils in the Four Corners region and this area is now known as one of the best sources of Late Triassic dinosaur fossils in the United States. Texas is also good source of dinosaur remains from this time. The oldest dinosaur remains in the eastern US are about 225 million years old. So, dinosaurs had reached the east coast of the United States not long after they evolved in the first place. Fossil footprints are the most common kind of early dinosaur fossil in the eastern United States.

As the Triassic ended, Pangaea was breaking up into separate continents again. Rift valleys formed along the east coast as the North American, European and African plates diverged. This process created rifts down the east coast to Florida. One of these rift valleys was inundated with ocean water and became the young Atlantic Ocean. Volcanism related to the tectonic processes fracturing Pangaea also left deposits in the eastern US. At the end of the Triassic another mass extinction occurred. Globally, this extinction event wiped out roughly one quarter of families. Conodonts went completely extinct. Ammonoids barely survived. Brachiopods lost much of their former diversity as well. On land, most families of amphibians and reptiles became extinct.

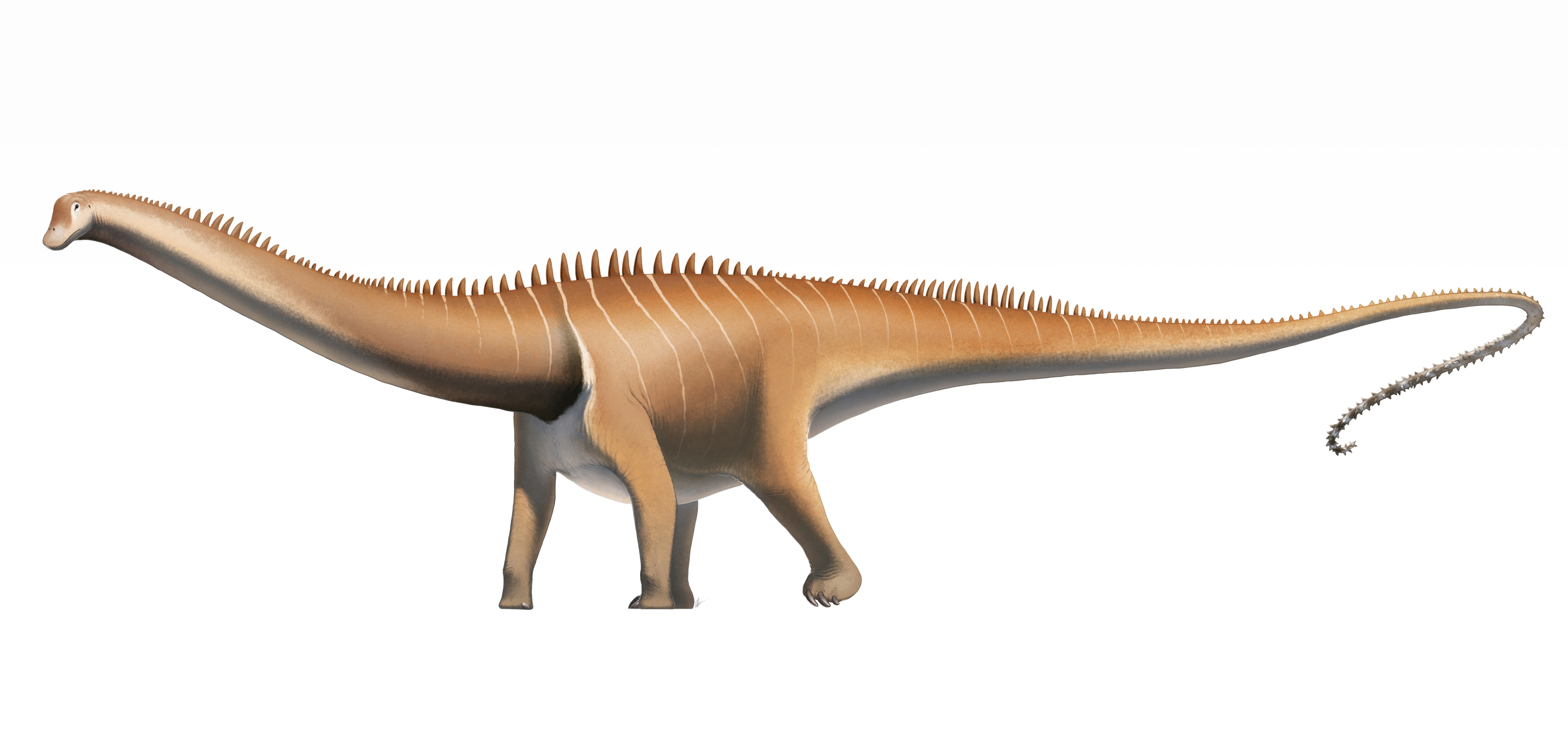
Diplodocus carnegii

The eastern coast of the US became warmer and wetter during the Early Jurassic because the newly formed Atlantic Ocean brought it into contact with more humid air. Fossils spanning from the Late Triassic to Early Jurassic were preserved in the Newark Supergroup, which is found between the Canadian province Nova Scotia and South Carolina. Rifting continued in the eastern part of the country during the Early Jurassic as the eastern United States drifted apart from Greenland and Europe. The Pacific Plate forced its way under the North American plate, triggering geologic upheaval, including volcanism, on the west coast. Ichthyosaurs remained the dominant marine reptiles of the Early Jurassic, but as the Jurassic progressed that title was gradually transferred to the plesiosaurs.

The stratigraphic unit known as the Morrison Formation was deposited during the Late Jurassic. These sediments are now exposed in Arizona, New Mexico, Oklahoma, Utah, Colorado, Wyoming, South Dakota, and Montana. At the time, this region of the country was home to forests of conifers, ginkgos, and tree ferns. Coal would later form from the remains of these plants. Local mammals diversified significantly during the Jurassic. The Morrison Formation is the best source of Jurassic mammal fossils in North America. Local dinosaurs included the ornithopod Camptosaurus, the sauropods Apatosaurus and Diplodocus, and the theropod Allosaurus. Unlike many periods of geologic history the Jurassic did not end in a mass extinction. There were, however, lesser extinction events going on at the time, with notable losses occurring among ammonoids and dinosaurs.

During the Early Cretaceous the Gulf of Mexico began gradually expanding northward. On land, the eastern United States resembled the modern Mississippi Delta. It was a low-lying plain divided by rivers. A thick coat of vegetation covered the region in plants like club mosses, conifers, cycads, ferns, ginkgoes, horsetails, and early flowers.

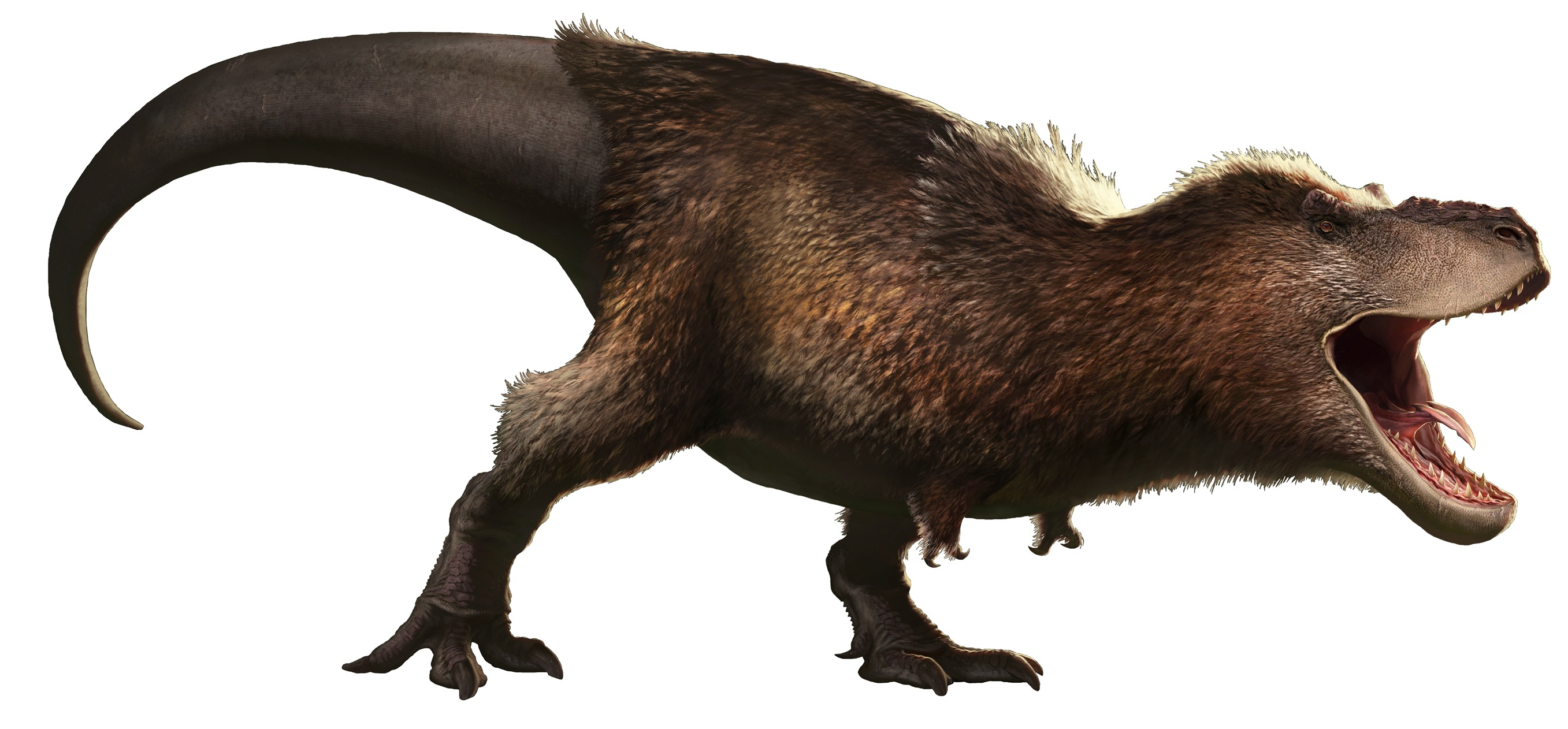
Tyrannosaurus rex

During the Late Cretaceous the Gulf of Mexico had expanded through North America until reaching Alaska. Up to half of the continent's modern surface area may have been submerged by this sea. This is called the Western Interior Seaway. It covered the majority of states like Texas, New Mexico, Oklahoma, Colorado, Kansas, Nebraska, the Dakotas, and Wyoming. The seafloor was smooth and probably never submerged by more than 600 feet of water. A great diversity of invertebrates flourished both on the bottom and in the water column. Examples include ammonites, giant clams, crinoids, rudists, and squid. Vertebrate life included bony fishes, mosasaurs, plesiosaurs, sharks, and turtles. Areas now occupied by the plains of the east coast from New Jersey southward as well as the Gulf coast region were covered in seawater during the Cretaceous. Sea levels reached their highest level in all of geologic history during the Cretaceous, although they declined before the period ended. Scleractinian corals were more diverse during the Cretaceous than they are today. Back then coral reefs formed along the Gulf coast. Rudist bivalves also constructed reefs in the Gulf coast region. Another bivalve, Exogyra, was so common its fossils are found in almost every Cretaceous marine deposit. During the Cretaceous, the dominant group of living fishes, the teleosts, first achieved ascendency over their holostean forebears. The aquatic toothed bird Hesperornis is the only known Cretaceous bird whose remains are found with any frequency in North America.

Near the end of the Cretaceous, the Western Interior Seaway began to withdraw. This regression would end up resulting in both halves of North America reuniting. As the seaway withdrew, a coastal plain expanded southward into the northern part of the western interior. Powerful geologic forces began to fold and distort the rocks of Idaho, Utah, and Wyoming, beginning the processes that would form the Rocky Mountains. Rivers flowing across the eastern part of what is now Montana, deposited the sediments now known as the Hell Creek Formation. At the time, Montana was home to some of the most famous dinosaurs; creatures like Edmontosaurus, Pachycephalosaurus, Triceratops, and Tyrannosaurus. Despite the western upheaval, the eastern US had achieved geological stability by the Late Cretaceous. The weather was uniformly warm and rainy throughout the year. Flowering plants were now common and fossil of broadleaf trees and shrubs were preserved in Late Cretaceous rocks.

The Cretaceous ended with another mass extinction. This one was the second most devastating in geologic history. Roughly half of all animal families became extinct. Ammonoids and belemnoids were among the marine invertebrates extinguished. Planktonic foraminiferans barely survived. Two thirds of coral species became extinct. About half of sponge families became extinct. Bivalves, bryozoans, and gastropods also sustained heavy losses. The major Mesozoic marine reptile groups became extinct. On land, the non-avian dinosaurs and pterosaurs became extinct. The most popular explanation for the mass extinction at the end of the Cretaceous is that it resulted from a meteorite impact. This impact would explain the presence of high levels of the heavy element iridium in sediments from the time. Iridium is very rare in Earth's crust but much more common in meteors. Dinosaurs were widespread within the regions now composing the modern United States. Dinosaur fossils are known to have been preserved in Alabama, Alaska, Arizona, Arkansas, California, Colorado, Connecticut, Delaware, Georgia, Idaho, Iowa, Kansas, Louisiana, Maryland, Massachusetts, Minnesota, Mississippi, Missouri, Montana, Nebraska, Nevada, New Jersey, New Mexico, New York, North Carolina, North Dakota, Oklahoma, Pennsylvania, South Carolina, South Dakota, Tennessee, Texas, Utah, Virginia, Washington, D.C., and Wyoming, but not in Florida, Hawaii, Illinois, Indiana, Kentucky, Maine, Michigan, New Hampshire, Ohio, Oregon, Rhode Island, Vermont, Washington, West Virginia, or Wisconsin.

== Cenozoic ==
After the Cretaceous, a new era of geologic time began; the Cenozoic era, which means the era of "recent life". Traditionally, the first period of the Cenozoic was called the Tertiary, however recent recommendations of the International Commission on Stratigraphy discourage its use, with the correspondent time span divided between the earlier Paleogene and the more recent Neogene periods. The geologic turmoil on the west coast was maintained as the Pacific Plate continued to slide under the North American Plate. During the early part of the Cenozoic period climates were much warmer than they are today. Latitudes as high as South Dakota had a subtropical climate until as recently as the end of the Oligocene.

Sea level fell throughout the Cenozoic. Areas of Cenozoic North America that were covered by seawater tended to be areas near the modern coasts. The Cannonball Sea near Minot, North Dakota was the last of the North American interior. Cenozoic marine invertebrates are best known from deposits near the coasts and tend to resemble modern forms. Solitary corals became common, but coral reefs formed only around the Gulf of Mexico. Sharks were common during the Cenozoic. From Eocene times onward they began increasing in size.

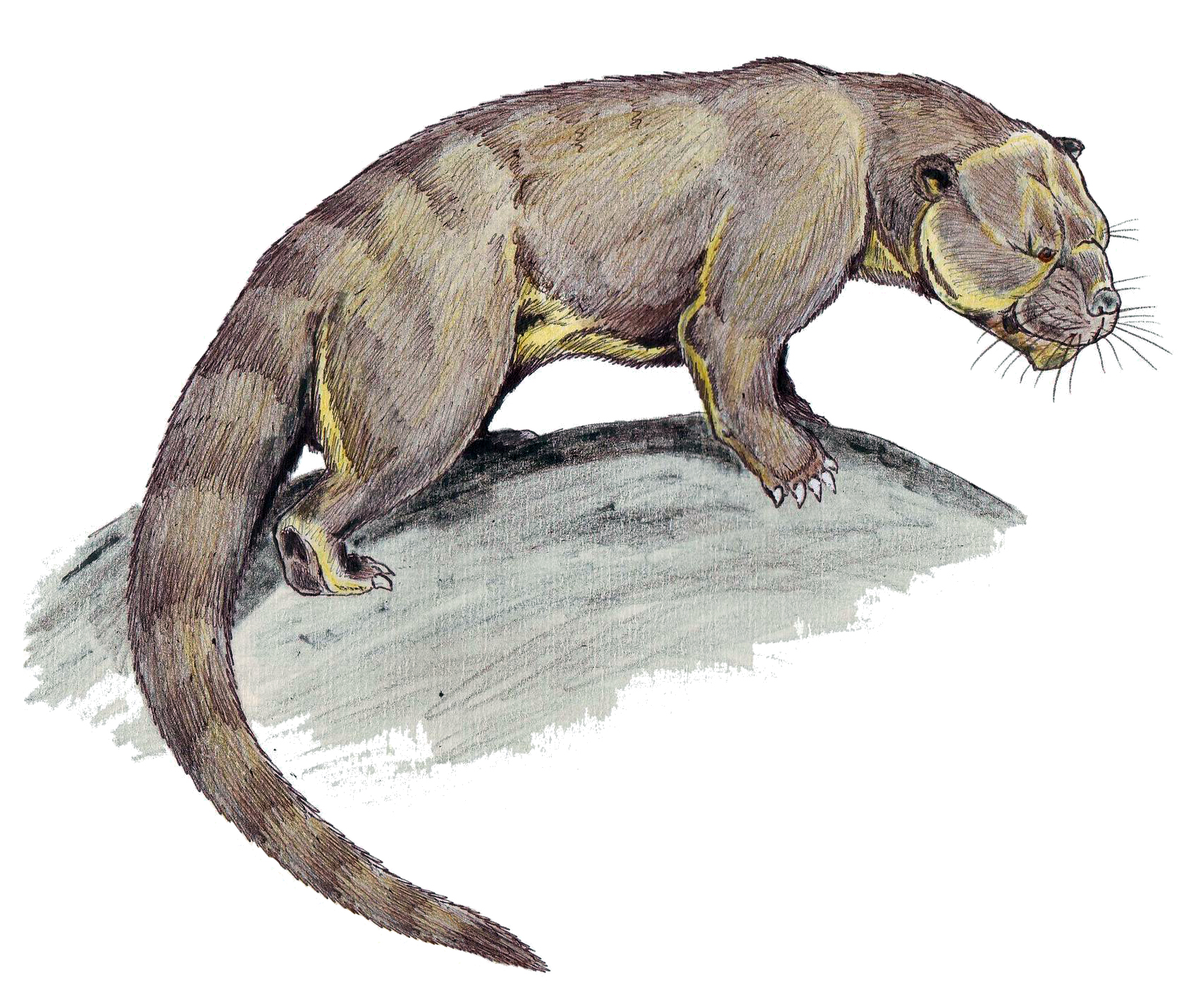
The creodont Patriofelis.

The beginning of the Cenozoic was also the beginning of the Age of Mammals. The small shrew-like generalist insectivores that survived the Late Cretaceous extinction event began diversifying into the mammals that dominate the modern world's terrestrial ecosystems. The creodonts, which first appeared in the Paleocene, were among the first mammals to specialize in carnivory. The coastal region of the southeastern states, like Alabama and Mississippi were covered in seawater and home to the primitive whale Basilosaurus during the Eocene. The diversity of mammalian carnivores on land increased from the Eocene to the Miocene.

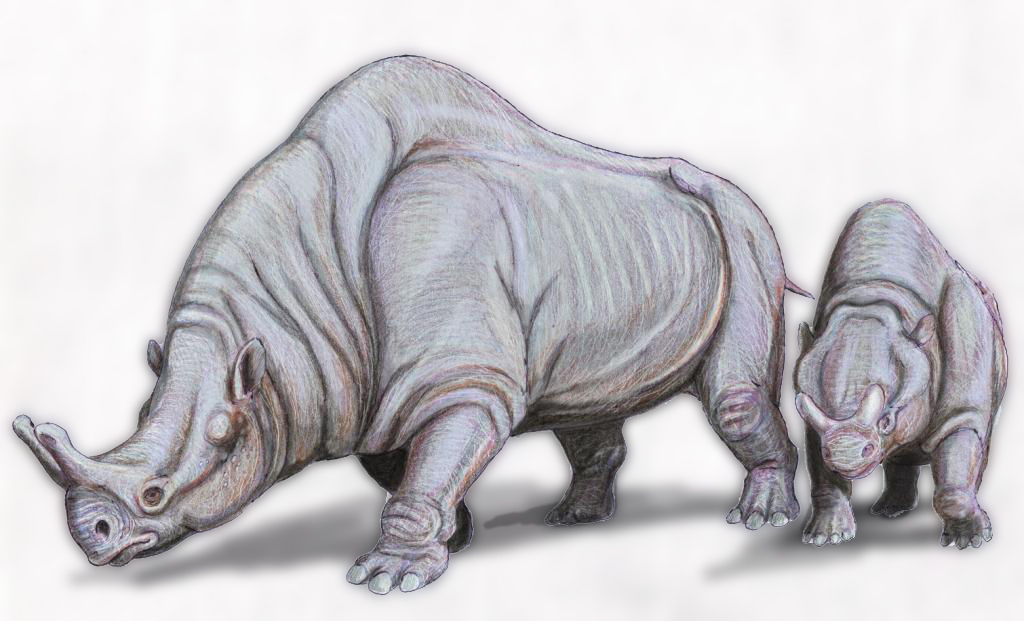
Brontotherium.

Around the same time, camels were becoming common in North America, although they were just barely bigger than modern rabbits during the Eocene. Early camels had four toes. During the early part of the Eocene the first primitive horses also began appearing. Among the earliest was Eohippus, a small animal with four toes on the front feet and three on the rear. A group of mammals called oreodonts also appeared during the Eocene. By the Oligocene, camels were the size of sheep and had only two toes. Gradually over time horses also lost toes, but unlike camels, horses' were reduced to a single digit. By the Oligocene their teeth had adapted to endure abrasion from silica in their increasingly grassy diets. Horses gradually became common throughout the country. Large numbers of oreodonts grazed in the badlands of South Dakota by the middle of the Cenozoic. Oreodonts were vaguely pig like and about the size of modern goats. Their numbers peaked during the Oligocene. The largest mammals of Oligocene North America were the rhinoceros-like titanotheres. One spectacular example was the abundant Brontotherium of South Dakota, which could be up to 8 feet tall at the shoulder. Despite their early success, by the end of the epoch the entire group became extinct.

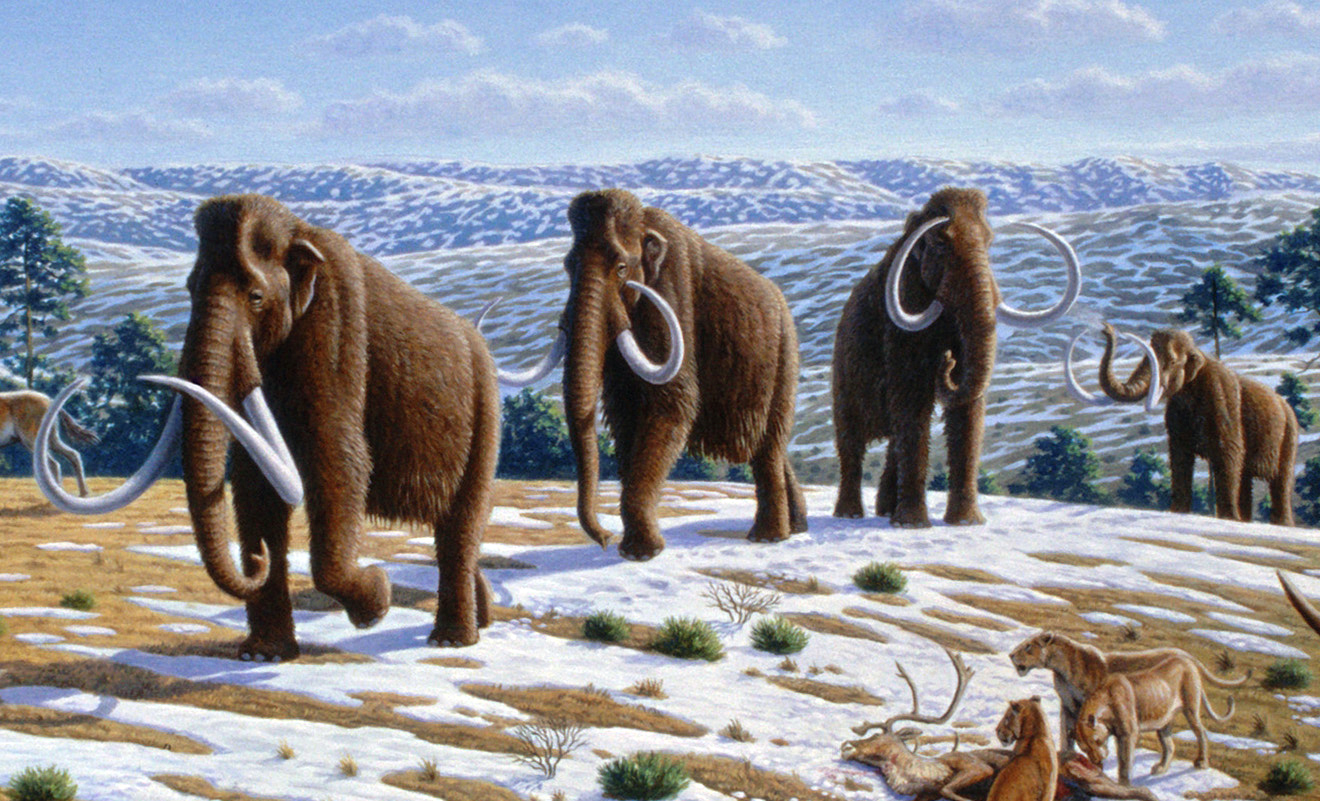
Wooly mammoths.

Following the Oligocene temperatures began to decline, and with it warm-weather vegetation was forced southward into lower latitudes. By the Miocene some sharks, which had been increasing in size since the Eocene, were over 60 feet long. Mastodons arrived in North America by crossing the Bering land bridge from the old world during the Miocene as well. The oreodonts became extinct during the Pliocene. By the time the Pliocene ended more modern carnivores like wolves and cats appeared. Notable among the latter group were the saber-toothed cats. Woolly mammoths became abundant across the US during the late Cenozoic. During the late Pleistocene, the large volumes of water were held frozen as part of glaciers. This caused a drop in sea level, which exposed a land bridge between Asia and Alaska. Humans crossed over this bridge and started becoming abundant in North America between 11,000 and 12,000 years ago. Despite withstanding the fluctuating climate and concomitant advance and retreat of glaciers, around 10,000 years ago around 32 genera of large mammals suddenly became extinct. Horses were locally extirpated during these end-Pleistocene megafauna extinctions. Some paleontologists attribute these extinctions to the arrival of early humans, who over hunted the local large game. Under this model, the disappearance of saber-toothed cats and other contemporary predators would be explained by the loss of their primary source of food. However, this explanation is still controversial.

== See also ==
- Prehistory of the Americas
- Prehistory of North America
- History of paleontology in the United States
- Paleontology in the United States
