= Trout Valley Formation =

Geologic formation in Maine, United States

- Stratigraphic range: Devonian
- Type: Formation

Location
- Region: Maine
- Country: United States

The Trout Valley Formation is a geologic formation in Maine. It preserves fossils dating back to the Devonian period.

== Description ==
Situated in north-central Maine, the Trout Valley Formation is located in a fault-bounded basin. An erosional unconformity separates it from underlying felsites. The formation exists entirely within the confines of Baxter State Park, and collecting of materials without authorization is prohibited.

The formation represents an alluvial fan draining an active volcanic source and has a basal cobble conglomerate, consisting only of rounded fragments of the underlying volcanic felsite, known formally as the Traveler Rhyolite. The conglomerate is overlain by sandstone, which contains lenses of gray shale, black shale and fine conglomerate, in a generally fining-upward sequence. The unit's distal portions terminate in tidal mudflats, which have produced a bivalve-dominated fauna that also yielded the first relatively complete Eurypterid found in northern New England.

The Trout Valley Formation also contains fossilized Psilophyton plants, as well as a number of other taxa, including Pertica quadrifaria, the official state fossil, the tallest plant of its age known from anywhere in the world. The Trout Valley Formation earlier was dated to the Early Devonian by the presence of fossilized eurypterid scales, possible estherids and ostracods, but is now assigned to the early Middle Devonian (Emsian); it is believed to be 3-5 million years older than the Gilboa Fossil Forest of New York.

In contrast to the Traveler Rhyolite and sandstones beneath the Trout Valley Formation, which have open folds, the formation itself is unfolded. However, normal bed-parallel faulting within the sandstones suggest that uplift may have been taking place during deposition. This suggests that the Trout Valley Formation was deposited after the tectonic activity that altered the underlying rocks, but before that which uplifted the mountains in this area had come to completion. Although the Katahdin Pluton cuts through the Traveler Rhyolite, granitic fragments from the Katahdin Pluton have never been found in the Trout Valley Formation. At least one minor dike of Traveler Rhyolite has, however, been found cutting through the rocks of the Trout Valley Formation.

== See also ==
- List of fossiliferous stratigraphic units in Maine
- Paleontology in Maine
