= Tarratine Formation =

Geologic formation in Maine, United States

- Stratigraphic range: Devonian
- Type: Formation

Location
- Region: Maine
- Country: United States

The Tarratine Formation is a geologic formation in Maine. It preserves fossils dating back to the Devonian period.

== Description ==
The Tarratine Formation is part of the larger Gaspé Group which extend from the Gaspé Peninsula to Long Island Sound. The Seboomoook Formation is interpreted as grading into the sandstones of the Tarratine Formation. In the late 20th century, geologists debated the origin of the sandstone in the formation. Some attributed the sand to islands, while geologists in Quebec suggested that the sand resulted from erosion associated with the Acadian orogeny. The formation is present in the Moose River synclinorium in north-central Maine.

== See also ==
- List of fossiliferous stratigraphic units in Maine
- Paleontology in Maine
