= List of fossiliferous stratigraphic units in Maine =

This article contains a list of fossil-bearing stratigraphic units in the state of Maine, U.S.

== Sites ==
Group or Formation	Period	Notes
Champlain Clay	Pleistocene	
Dockendorff Group/Chapman Sandstone	Devonian	
Frenchville Formation	Silurian	
Gaspé Group/Tomhegan Formation	Devonian	
Little East Lake Formation	Ordovician	
Mapleton Sandstone	Devonian	
Perham Formation	Silurian	
Presumpscot Formation	Pleistocene	
Shin Brook Formation	Ordovician	
Tarratine Formation	Devonian	
Trout Valley Formation	Devonian	

== See also ==
- Paleontology in Maine
