= Littleton Formation =

- Stratigraphic range: Devonian
- The Littleton Formation in Sphinx Col between Mount Jefferson and Mount Clay in the Presidential Range of New Hampshire
- Type: Formation

Location
- Region: New Hampshire
- Country: United States

The Littleton Formation is a geologic formation in New Hampshire. It preserves fossils dating back to the Devonian period. The formation is exposed on several of New Hampshire's most prominent mountains, including Mount Washington and the northern Presidential Range, Mount Moosilauke, and Mount Monadnock.

== See also ==
- List of fossiliferous stratigraphic units in New Hampshire
- Paleontology in New Hampshire
