= Champlain Clay =

Geological formation in Maine, US

- Type: Formation

Location
- Region: Maine
- Country: United States

The Champlain Clay is a geologic formation in Maine. It preserves fossils.

== See also ==
- List of fossiliferous stratigraphic units in Maine
- Paleontology in Maine
