= Shin Brook Formation =

Geologic formation in Maine, United States

- Stratigraphic range: Ordovician
- Type: Formation

Location
- Region: Maine
- Country: United States

The Shin Brook Formation is a geologic formation in Maine. It preserves fossils dating back to the Ordovician period.

== See also ==
- List of fossiliferous stratigraphic units in Maine
- Paleontology in Maine
