= Chapman Sandstone =

Geologic formation in Maine

- Stratigraphic range: Devonian
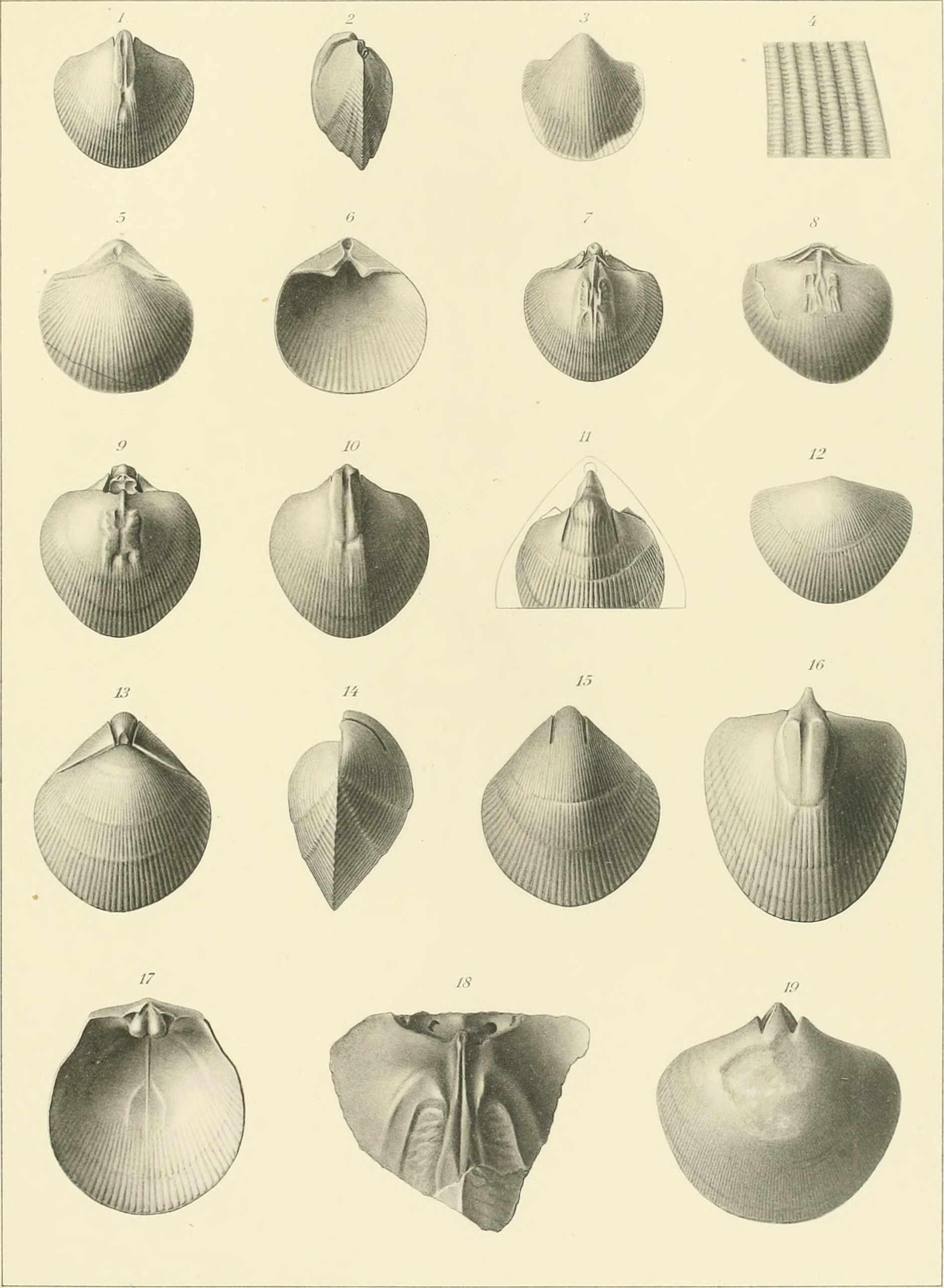
- Fossils from the Chapman Sandstone
- Type: Formation

Lithology
- Primary: Sandstone

Location
- Region: Maine
- Country: United States

The Chapman Sandstone is a geologic formation in Maine. It preserves fossils dating back to the Early Devonian.

== See also ==
- List of fossiliferous stratigraphic units in Maine
- Paleontology in Maine
