= Perham Formation =

Geologic formation in Maine, United States

- Stratigraphic range: Silurian
- Type: Formation

Location
- Region: Maine
- Country: United States

The Perham Formation is a geologic formation in Maine. It preserves fossils dating back to the Silurian period.

== See also ==
- List of fossiliferous stratigraphic units in Maine
- Paleontology in Maine
