= Prehistory of the United States =

Prehistory of the United States may refer to:

- Geological history of North America
- History of Native Americans in the United States
