= List of the prehistoric life of New Hampshire =

This list of the prehistoric life of New Hampshire contains the various prehistoric life-forms whose fossilized remains have been reported from within the US state of New Hampshire.

== Precambrian ==
The Paleobiology Database records no known occurrences of Precambrian fossils in New Hampshire.

== Paleozoic ==
- †Acrospirifer
  - †Acrospirifer murchisoni – or unidentified comparable form
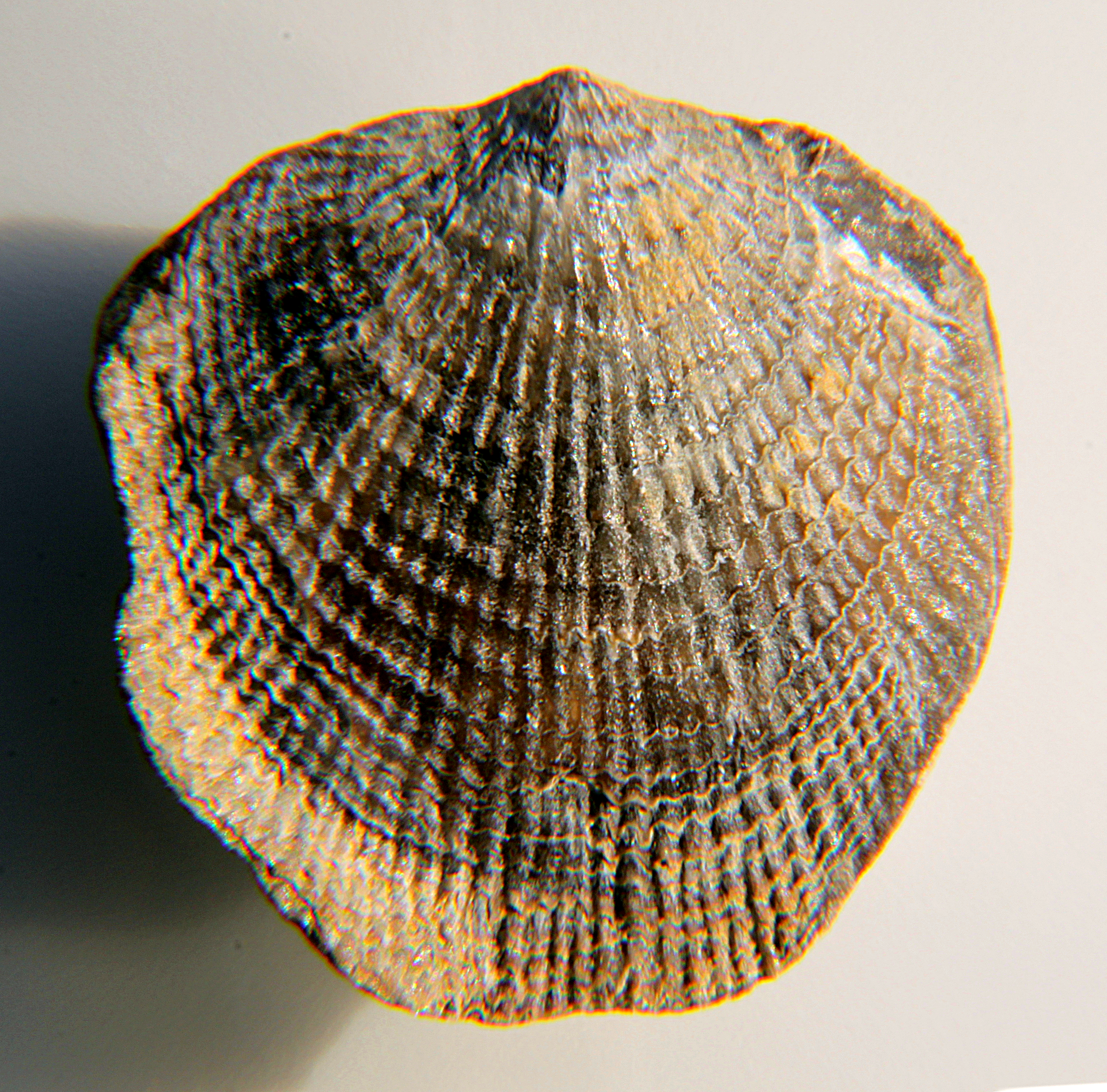
- Fossilized shell of the Late Ordovician-Carboniferous brachiopod Atrypa
  †Atrypa
  - †Atrypa reticularis – or unidentified comparable form
- †Coelospira
- †Cyrtia – tentative report
- †Eospirifer
- †Howellella
- †Leptaena
- †Leptocoelia
  - †Leptocoelia flabellites – or unidentified comparable form
- †Loxonema – or unidentified comparable form
- †Paleocyclas
- †Plectodonta
- †Protoleptostrophia
- †Resserella
- †Stricklandia
- †Tryplasma – tentative report

== Mesozoic-Cenozoic ==
The Paleobiology Database records no known occurrences of Mesozoic or Cenozoic fossils in New Hampshire.
