= Dockendorff =

Dockendorff is a toponymic surname of German origin, likely from Dockendorf, Rhineland-Palatinate. Notable people with the surname include:

- Eduardo Dockendorff (born 1949), Chilean architect and politician
- Sid Dockendorff (1908–2005), Australian rules footballer

== See also ==
- Dockendorff Group, a geologic group in Maine
- Parkinson & Dockendorff, a former architectural firm in La Crosse, Wisconsin
