= List of fossiliferous stratigraphic units in New Hampshire =

This article contains a list of fossil-bearing stratigraphic units in the state of New Hampshire, U.S.

== Sites ==
Group or Formation	Period	Notes
Clough Formation	Silurian	
Littleton Formation	Devonian	

== See also ==
- Paleontology in New Hampshire
