= Clough Formation =

Geologic formation in New Hampshire, US

- Stratigraphic range: Silurian
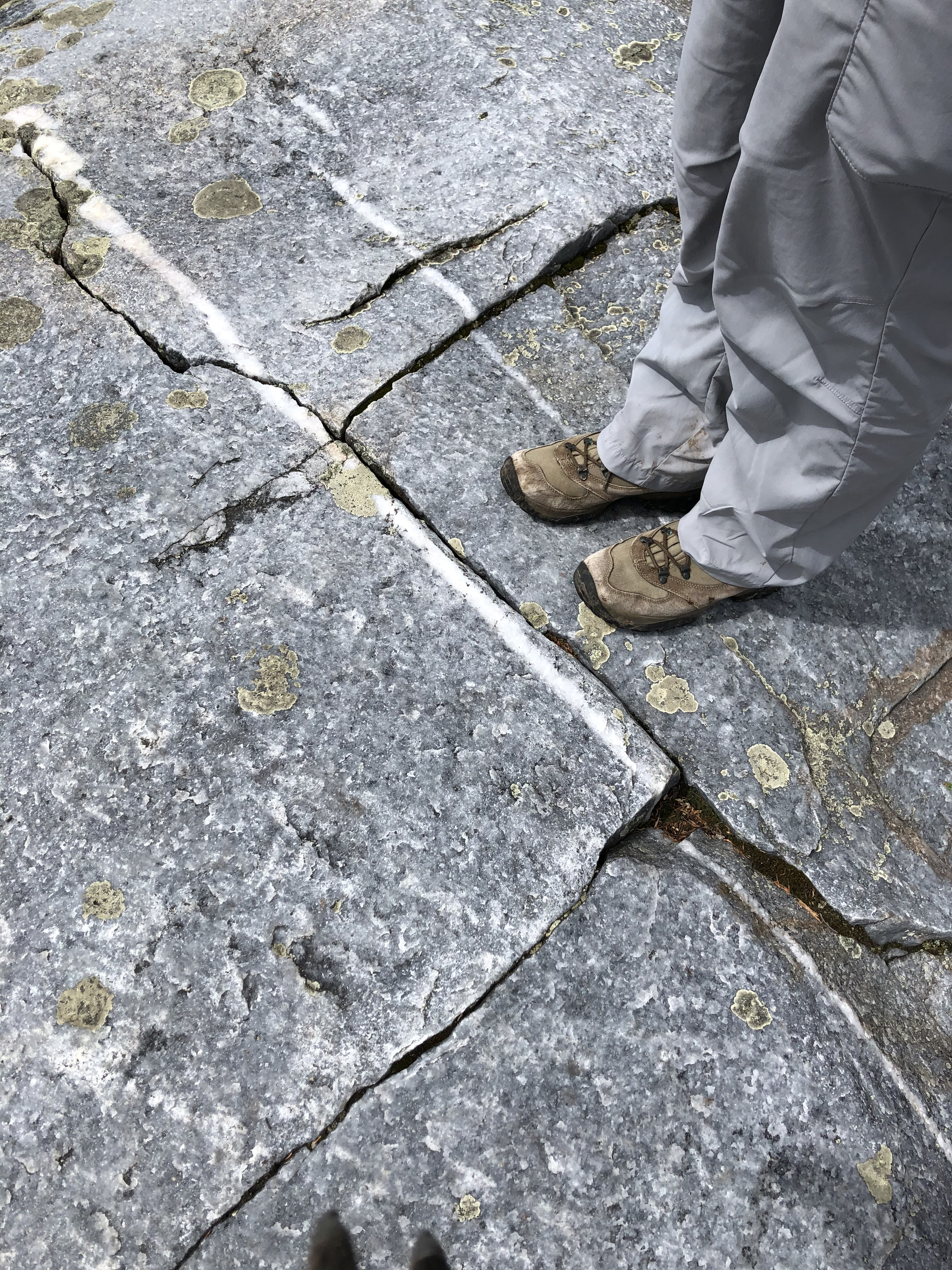
- Clough Formation on the summit of Mount Cube in Orford, NH
- Type: Formation

Location
- Region: New Hampshire
- Country: United States

The Clough Formation is a geologic formation in western New Hampshire. It preserves fossils dating back to the Silurian period. Prominent exposures include along the ridges of Croydon Mountain, Moose Mountain, Smarts Mountain, and Mount Cube.

== See also ==
- List of fossiliferous stratigraphic units in New Hampshire
- Paleontology in New Hampshire
