= Dockendorff Group =

- Stratigraphic range: Devonian
- Type: Group

Location
- Region: Maine
- Country: United States

The Dockendorff Group is a geologic group in Maine. It preserves fossils dating back to the Devonian period.

== See also ==
- List of fossiliferous stratigraphic units in Maine
- Paleontology in Maine
