= Paleontology in Connecticut =

Paleontological research in the U.S. state of Connecticut

The location of the state of Connecticut

Paleontology in Connecticut refers to paleontological research occurring within or conducted by people from the U.S. state of Connecticut. Apart from its famous dinosaur tracks, the fossil record in Connecticut is relatively sparse. The oldest known fossils in Connecticut date back to the Triassic period. At the time, Pangaea was beginning to divide and local rift valleys became massive lakes. A wide variety of vegetation, invertebrates and reptiles are known from Triassic Connecticut. During the Early Jurassic local dinosaurs left behind an abundance of footprints that would later fossilize.

The first scientifically verified dinosaur bones discovered in North America were uncovered during the 1818 excavation of a well in Connecticut. Other notable finds include the aetosaur Stegomus, the phytosaur Clepsysaurus, and the prosauropod dinosaur Anchisaurus. The Jurassic dinosaur track Eubrontes giganteus is the Connecticut state fossil.

== Prehistory ==
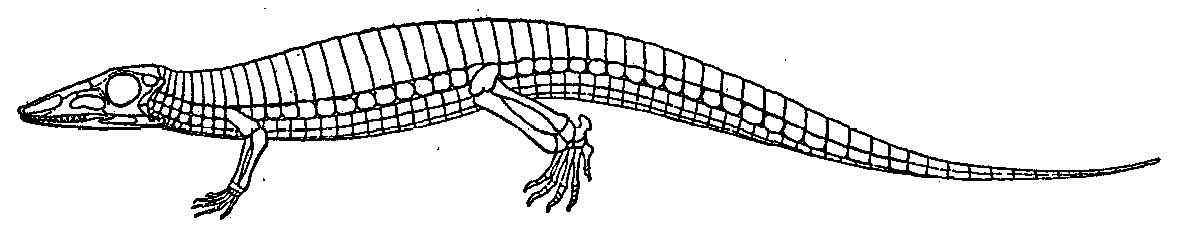
Restoration of Aetosaurus ferratus by Othniel Charles Marsh

No fossils are known in the state of Connecticut that are older than the Triassic period. At that time the central part of the state was the site of alluvial fans and braided streams. As Pangaea began to break up rift valleys formed in the state. These filled with water and became massive lakes. Roughly 200 million years ago, the New Haven Arkose began to be deposited. The phytosaur Clepsysaurus lived in Connecticut at this time and left behind remains near Simsbury. The herbivorous reptile Hypsognathus was another Triassic inhabitant of Connecticut and left behind remains near Meriden. The aetosaur Stegomus was also present and left behind skin impressions in addition to body fossils near Fairhaven. The state's Mesozoic invertebrates included at least two different kinds of mollusk and one insect. Some of the trails of invertebrates left in life have been preserved as trace fossils in Connecticut, although such finds are more common in neighboring Massachusetts. At least six genera and thirteen species of Mesozoic fishes are known from Connecticut. The Mesozoic flora of Connecticut included conifers, cycads, ferns, and rushes. Central Connecticut was still the site of alluvial fans and braided streams into the Jurassic period. Roughly 95% of the dinosaur footprints at Rocky Hill were of the ichnogenus Eubrontes. The dinosaur footprints of Connecticut and those of neighboring Massachusetts have sometimes been regarded as composing a single continuous site. Other reptiles and amphibians left trace fossils in Connecticut as well as dinosaurs. At least 13 species in seven ichnogenera of non-dinosaurian Mesozoic reptile footprint are known from the state.

Connecticut has no Cretaceous rocks in which fossils may have been preserved. This gap in the rock record continues into the Cenozoic era and spans the entire Tertiary period. However, local sedimentation resumed during the Quaternary period as glaciers intruded into the state. Local wildlife preserved in glacial deposits include close relatives of modern clams, crustaceans, and snails. They left their remains in the state's northwest and at Long Island Sound.

== History ==
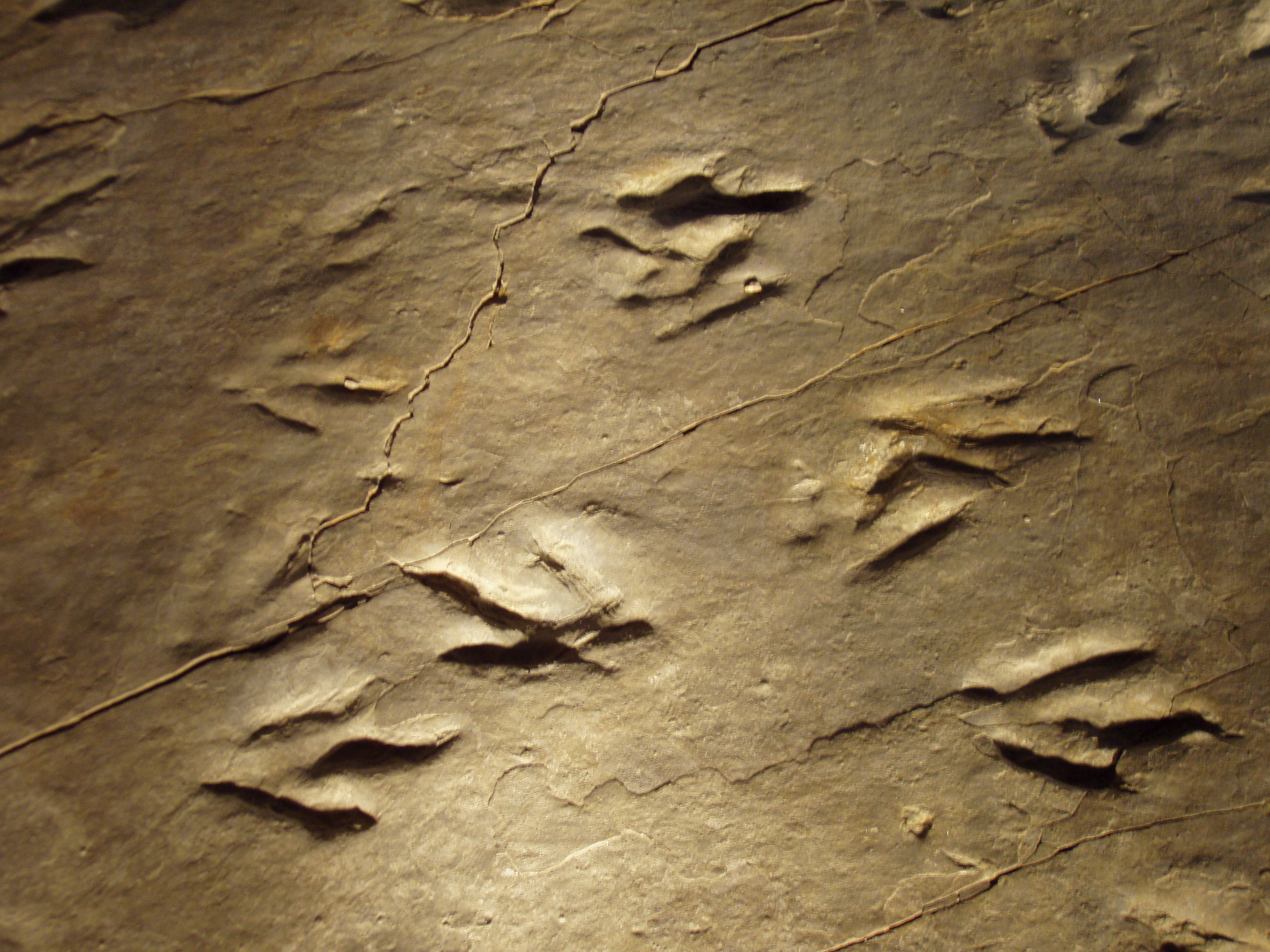
Fossil footprints at Dinosaur State Park.

In 1818, Solomon Ellsworth Jr. was blasting a well in East Windsor and uncovered some fossil bones about 18 feet under the surface of the rock. These are the first scientifically verified dinosaur bones discovered in North America. Two years later, Nathan Smith reported the fossils Ellsworth discovered to the American Journal of Science, interpreting the fossils as human remains. In 1823 Professor Edward Hitchcock published research on Connecticut's fossil plants. In 1848 he wrote about the local tracks. By 1858, 38 different dinosaur track-bearing quarries were known in Connecticut but few additional finds would be made until the 1960s.

Later in the 19th century came John Bell Hatcher's 1884 graduation from Yale. Later that same year, on October 20, an Early Jurassic prosauropod specimen was discovered in a Manchester quarry belonging to Charles O. Wolcott. Workers noticed the pelvis and hindlimb of the animal after the block hypothesized to preserve the front half of the animal had already been used to build a bridge in South Manchester. Othniel Charles Marsh named the animal Anchisaurus major. Four years later, Yale received the type specimen of the phytosaur Clepsysaurus. Later, in 1892, Marsh erected the species Anchisaurus colurus for another skeleton discovered in the Wolcott Quarry. Marsh doted on the specimen's excellent preservation. As of 1996, this find was still the best preserved "prosauropod" skeleton in North America. Marsh also erected the species Anchisaurus solus for another specimen discovered in the Wolcott Quarry at the same time as Anchisaurus colurus. The Anchisaurus solus type specimen was smaller and more poorly preserved than Anchisaurus colurus, but still likewise nearly complete. In 1896 Marsh described the fossil skin impression of the aetosaur Stegomus discovered in the Freeman Clark Quarry of Fair Haven. One of the major events of the early 20th century was the 1915 classification of the dinosaur bones uncovered while blasting for a well in 1818 as Anchisaurus colurus.

== Protected areas ==
- Dinosaur State Park and Arboretum

== People ==
=== Births ===
- Henry Fairfield Osborn was born in Fairfield on August 8, 1857.

=== Deaths ===
- Charles Emerson Beecher died in New Haven on February 14, 1904.
- Othniel Charles Marsh died in New Haven on March 18, 1899 at age 67.
- John Ostrom died in Litchfield on July 16, 2005 at age 77.

== Natural history museums ==
- Bruce Museum of Arts and Science, Greenwich
- Connecticut State Museum of Natural History, Storrs (closed)
- Peabody Museum of Natural History at Yale University, New Haven
- Stamford Museum and Nature Center, Stamford

== See also ==
- Paleontology in Massachusetts
- Paleontology in New York
- Paleontology in Rhode Island
