= Lisa Amati =

Invertebrate paleontologist

Lisa Amati is an invertebrate paleontologist who has discovered new species of trilobites, naming one of her discoveries Kermiti for its resemblance to Kermit the Frog. She became New York State's Paleontologist in 2015 and as such curates the New York State Museum's palaeontology collection.

== Career ==
Amati was appointed New York State's paleontologist in June 2015 by the New York State Board of Regents, becoming the first woman in over 50 years to serve as New York State Paleontologist.

(Winifred Goldring was the first woman New York State Paleontologist and served in that role from 1939 to 1954.) In this position Amati curates the New York State Museum's paleontology collection and conducts field and laboratory research focusing on 450 million year old Trilobites. For 11 years she served as a professor of geology at the State University of New York at Potsdam.

Her publications include co-authoring "Systematics and paleobiogeographic significance of the Upper Ordovician pterygometopine trilobite Achatella Delo,1935," (2016), Journal of Paleontology; "The Upper Ordovician trilobite Raymondites Sinclair, 144 in North America," (2015), Journal of Paleontology; and authoring "Isoteline trilobites of the Viola Group (Ordovician: Oklahoma): systematics and stratigraphic occurrence" (2014),; and the establishment of the family Chimaerastacidae to the decapod infraorder Astacidea, Journal of Paleontology. Dr. Amati earned her B.S. in geology in 1997 from University of Wyoming, a M.S. in geology in 1999 from Kent State University and a Ph.D. in geology in 2004 from the University of Oklahoma.
