= Paleontology in Rhode Island =

Paleontological research in the U.S. state of Rhode Island

The location of the state of Rhode Island

Paleontology in Rhode Island refers to paleontological research occurring within or conducted by people from the U.S. state of Rhode Island. Rhode Island has a relatively sparse fossil record. Among its more common fossils are plant remains that are frequently associated with the state's coal beds. During the early Paleozoic, Rhode Island was at least partially submerged under a sea inhabited by trilobites. During the Carboniferous period the state became a swampy environment where lush vegetation included trees more than 50 feet high. Local animal life included arachnids and insects like cockroaches. Rift basins formed locally during the Permian. The ensuing Triassic and Jurassic periods are absent from the state's rock record. Little is known about the state's Cretaceous history. The Paleogene and Neogene periods are also missing from Rhode Island's rock record. During the Pleistocene the state was subjected to glacial activity. Notable local fossil finds have included previously unknown kinds of insect and abundant ancient amphibian trackways.

== Prehistory ==
No Precambrian fossils are known from Rhode Island, which was located in the polar latitudes of the Southern Hemisphere at that time. The fossil record of the state's early Paleozoic history does not add much information about the state's ancient wildlife either. Nevertheless, evidence indicates that the state was at least partially submerged by seawater at some time during this interval. Among the few known fossils from this general time period are trilobites preserved in metamorphic rocks deposited in that same Paleozoic sea. During the Carboniferous period the same geologic forces that would later become responsible for dividing Pangaea triggered the formation of a rift basin in the northern part of the state. Rivers and streams drained into the basin, which became a swampy environment. Rhode Island was home to a rich flora during the Pennsylvanian epoch of the Carboniferous. These plants left behind abundant fossils like leaves, stems, and trunks. Club moss and horsetail fossils are preserved as casts in sandstone of more recent age. One of the best of these later specimens was a trunk with a 16-inch diameter from a tree that was estimated to be more than 50 feet tall.

Carboniferous Rhode Island was home to a variety of arthropods. Anthracomartus, a type of anthracomartidae, was an arachnid that lived in Rhode Island during the Carboniferous. This genus was the first Carboniferous arachnid ever found in the eastern United States. Other notable Carboniferous arthropods from Rhode Island included a previously unknown genus of neuropteroid (related to the net-winged insects), as well as a new protophasmid (an herbivorous insect). At the time, Rhode Island was also home to many kinds of cockroaches.

During the Permian the geologic forces that would later split Pangaea continued the process of rift basin formation in northern Rhode Island. During the Triassic and Jurassic local sediments were being eroded away from the state rather than deposited, so there are no rocks of this age in which fossils could have been preserved within Rhode Island's boundaries. Despite the absence of Triassic and Jurassic rock in the states, some sedimentary rocks dating back to the Cretaceous have persisted on Block Island. Nevertheless, no dinosaur fossils have ever been discovered in Rhode Island. Like during the Triassic and Jurassic, Rhode Island's sediments were being eroded away rather than deposited during the ensuing Paleogene and Neogene periods of the Cenozoic era, leaving another gap in the state's geologic and fossil record. More recently, during the Pleistocene, Rhode Island was scoured by glaciers.

== History ==
Near the end of 1892 a clergyman from Providence discovered the fossilized wing of a prehistoric cockroach in Pawtucket. In 1914 construction began for a trolley tunnel to run through College Hill. During excavation an abundance of plant fossils were found that were later curated at Brown University. In the 2020s, fossil shark teeth were uncovered from the beaches of Rhode Island.

== Natural history museums ==
- Rhode Island Museum of Natural History and Planetarium, Providence

== See also ==
- Paleontology in Connecticut
- Paleontology in Massachusetts
