= Paleontology in Massachusetts =

Paleontological research in the U.S. state of Massachusetts

The location of the state of Massachusetts

Paleontology in Massachusetts refers to paleontological research occurring within or conducted by people from the U.S. state of Massachusetts. The fossil record of Massachusetts is very similar to that of neighboring Connecticut. During the early part of the Paleozoic era, Massachusetts was covered by a warm shallow sea, where brachiopods and trilobites would come to live. No Carboniferous or Permian fossils are known from the state. During the Cretaceous period the area now occupied by the Elizabeth Islands and Martha's Vineyard were a coastal plain vegetated by flowers and pine trees at the edge of a shallow sea. No rocks are known of Paleogene or early Neogene age in the state, but during the Pleistocene evidence indicates that the state was subject to glacial activity and home to mastodons. The local fossil theropod footprints of Massachusetts may have been at least a partial inspiration for the Tuscarora legend of the Mosquito Monster or Great Mosquito in New York. Local fossils had already caught the attention of scientists by 1802 when dinosaur footprints were discovered in the state. Other notable discoveries include some of the first known fossil of primitive sauropodomorphs and Podokesaurus. Dinosaur tracks are the Massachusetts state fossil.

== Prehistory ==
No Precambrian fossils are known from Massachusetts, so the state's fossil record does not begin until the Paleozoic era. During the early part of the era the state was covered by a warm shallow sea. The local brachiopods and trilobites left behind their fossils. The state's Carboniferous rocks are metamorphosed and therefore don't have any fossils, though fossils have been found in the Wamsutta Formation. Some fossils from the Pennsylvanian age have been unearthed here. The Permian occupies a gap in the state's rock record because at that time local sediments were being eroded away rather than deposited. During the Cretaceous period the area now occupied by the Elizabeth Islands and Martha's Vineyard were a coastal plain near a shallow sea. Flowering plants and pine trees grew on this plain. The ensuing Tertiary period of the Cenozoic era is another gap in the state's rock record. Nevertheless, during the Pleistocene epoch glaciers intruded into the state. The sediments they deposited preserved mastodons and molluscs at Cape Cod.

== History ==
=== Indigenous interpretations ===
The local fossil theropod footprints of Massachusetts may have been at least a partial inspiration for the Tuscarora legend of the Mosquito Monster or Great Mosquito in New York. The story of the Great Mosquito describes it as having a wingspan as wide as three men, a long beak with sharp teeth, claws as long as arrows, a body the size of the bear and leaving birdlike footprints about twenty inches long. It killed many people and when it swooped down on Native forts its large wings made a loud noise. The sky spirit killed the Great Mosquito at the salt lake near Onondaga, where the local Onondaga and Cayuga people examined its remains. The area became known as the Place Where the Great Mosquito Lies. The birdlike footprints in the legend resemble those left by theropod dinosaurs. However, since there are no Mesozoic strata nearby to preserve them the footprints inspiring the story may have been observed elsewhere in New England, like Massachusetts, where they are quite abundant.

=== Scientific research ===
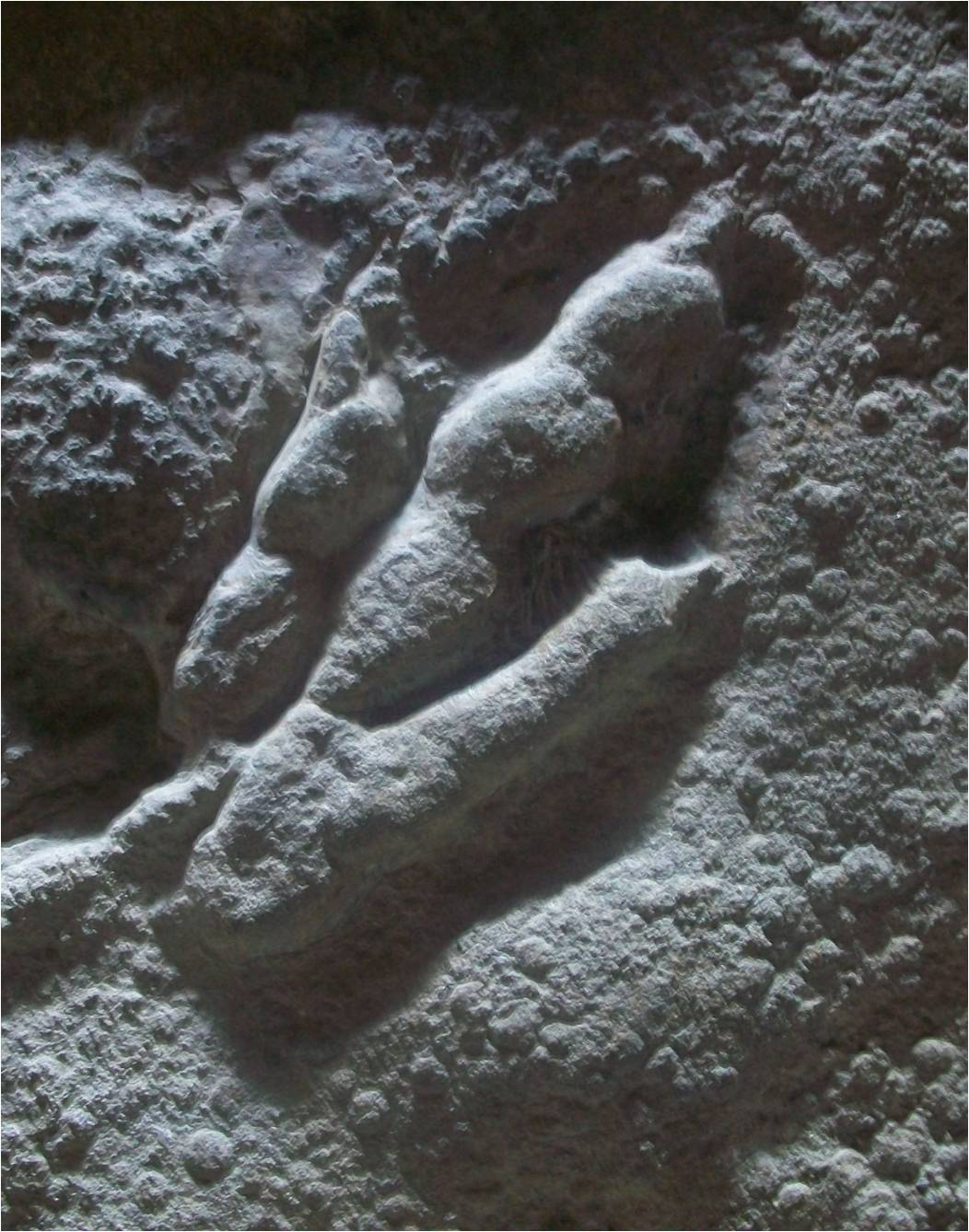
Negative Grallator showing skin impressions

Among the earliest major fossil discoveries in Massachusetts occurred during the spring of 1802, when Pliny Moody uncovered a piece of reddish sandstone with bird-like three toed footprints while ploughing on his father's farm in South Hadley. More fossil footprints were discovered a few decades later, in 1835. At the time, the town of Greenfield Massachusetts was laying paving when residents noticed footprints on the sandstone slabs that resembled those of turkeys. The rocks used in the project had been excavated at Turners Falls, and this location would turn out to be the most productive dinosaur tracksite in the Connecticut Valley. Later that year, the fossil footprints discovered while paving in Greenfield were brought to the attention of local naturalist and physician James Deane, whose curiosity was piqued. Deane wrote a letter to Amherst College geology professor Edward B. Hitchcock. Hitchcock spent the rest of the summer traveling through the Connecticut Valley examining the fossil footprints. The next year Hitchcock wrote a scientific paper on the fossil footprints of the Connecticut Valley; he thought the tracks were made by giant birds. Later, in 1843, James Deane began publishing on the Connecticut Valley track fossils with a paper in the American Journal of Science. In 1847 the ichnospecies Otozoum moodi was named after Pliny Moody.

In the mid-nineteenth century came an 1855 discovery by William Smith, Esquire. Smith noticed fossil bones uncovered in the process of blasting for renovations to the water shops of the US Armory at Springfield, Massachusetts. Many of the fossils had already been removed. General Whitney, who was in charge of the armory, ordered that the remaining fossils be re-examined. William Smith showed the leftover fossils to Edward Hitchcock. Hitchcock gave the fossils to Jeffries Wyman. the remains included eleven vertebrae, most of a hand, a partial pelvis and hind limb. Later that year, the Appleton Cabinet was built by Amherst College to house the dinosaur tracks collected and studied by Edward Hitchcock. In 1858, Hitchcock published again on the Connecticut Valley fossil footprints. Still interpreting them as bird tracks, he classified the trackmakers based on whether their toes were thick or narrow. Hitchcock died in 1864. The next year, a posthumous supplement to Hitchcock's 1858 Ichnology of New England was published. In 1865, the fossils uncovered at the Armory in Springfield were finally given a name. In England, Sir Richard Owen examined the fossils and named them Megadactylus polyzelus.

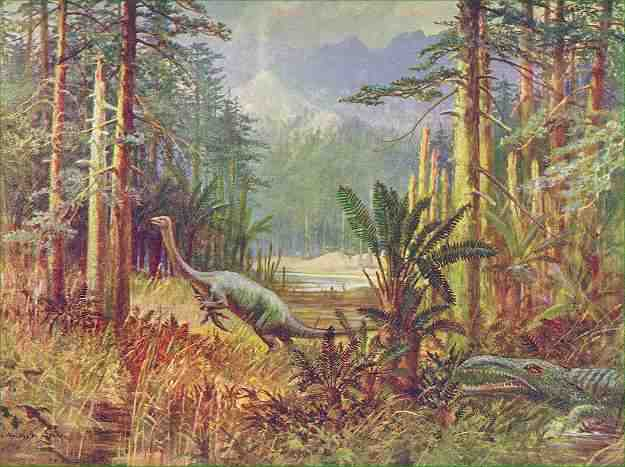
Restoration of Anchisaurus.

Massachusetts paleontology saw major events occur early in the twentieth century as well. In 1904, Richard Swann Lull published his first study of the Connecticut Valley fossil footprints. Five years later Massachusetts paleontologist Mignon Talbot became the first woman elected to the Paleontological Society, and during October of the next year, Mignon Talbot discovered a partial dinosaur skeleton in a gravel pit near the South Hadley Center belonging to John A. Boynton. The discovery has been called "the most prized specimen" in Mount Holyoke College's geological museum. It has also been regarded as the last major find in the "Connecticut Valley 'bone rush'". That December, Talbot gave a presentation to the Paleontological Society about her dinosaur discovery in South Hadley. She interpreted the skeleton as belonging to an herbivore. The next year Mignon Talbot collaborated with Richard Swann Lull collaborated on a description for the recently discovered dinosaur at South Hadley. They corrected Talbot's previous misidentification of the specimen as an herbivore and reclassified it as a theropod. They named it Podokesaurus holyokensis. Six years later, a fire consumed Williston Hall at Mount Holyoke College, destroying the bones of Podokesaurus holyokensis. However, casts previously taken of the bones survive in Yale's Peabody Museum and New York's American Museum of Natural History.

Almost two decades later, Carlton S. Nash discovered Early Jurassic dinosaur footprints in Portland Formation rock near South Hadley, not far from Pliny Moody's early dinosaur discovery. Around 1939 Nash bought the site of his 1933 dinosaur footprint discovery starting Nash Dinosaurland and selling dinosaur tracks to a worldwide market.

In 2021 a currently undescribed Neotheropod dinosaur found from a partial humerus was discovered by Mark McMenamin. In his study, he estimates it to be around 9 meters long with a potential semi aquatic lifestyle.

== People ==
=== Births ===
- Henry Nathaniel Andrews was born in 1910.
- Frank M. Carpenter was born in 1902.
- Preston Cloud was born in West Upton on September 26, 1912.
- Joseph Pitty Couthouy was born in Boston on 6 January, 1808.
- James Hall (paleontologist) was born in Hingham on September 12, 1811.
- David M. Raup was born in Boston in 1933.
- Charles Abiathar White was born in North Dighton on January 26, 1826.
- Samuel Wendell Williston was born in Boston on July 10, 1851.

== Natural history museums ==
- Amherst College Museum of Natural History, Amherst
- Berkshire Museum, Pittsfield
- Cape Cod Museum of Natural History, Brewster
- Harvard Museum of Natural History, Cambridge
- Marion Natural History Museum, Marion
- Museum of Science, Boston
- Natural Science Museum in Hinchman House, Maria Mitchell Association, Nantucket

== Private and commercial enterprises ==
- Nash Dinosaurland

== Events ==
- East Coast Gem, Mineral & Fossil Show

== See also ==
- Paleontology in Connecticut
- Paleontology in New Hampshire
- Paleontology in New York
- Paleontology in Rhode Island
- Paleontology in Vermont
