= Gilboa Fossil Forest =

Petrified forest in the United States

Gilboa tree fossil (Wattieza)

Gilboa Fossil Forest, New York, United States, is a petrified forest and one of the oldest known forests. Located near the Gilboa Dam in Schoharie County, New York, the region is home to tree trunks from the Devonian period. The fossils, some of the only survivors of their type in the world, are believed to have been from one of the first forests on Earth, and was part of the Earth's afforestation. Paleobotanists have been interested in the site since the 1920s when construction work for a water supply project found several large, vertical fossilized stumps. Some of these remain on display at the Gilboa Dam site (42°24′1.46″N 74°27′0.49″W) and the New York Power Authority Blenheim-Gilboa Visitor Center in Schoharie County and at the New York State Museum.
