= Paleontology in New Hampshire =

Paleontological research in the U.S. state of New Hampshire

The location of the state of New Hampshire

Paleontology in New Hampshire refers to paleontological research occurring within or conducted by people from the U.S. state of New Hampshire. Fossils are very rare in New Hampshire because so much of the state's geology is highly metamorphic. The state's complicated geologic history has made dating its rocks and the fossils they contain "a difficult task." The state's Devonian rocks are especially metamorphosed, yet its Mississippian rocks formed too recently to have been subject to the same metamorphism. Nevertheless, despite the geologic complications some fossils have been discovered in the state.

During the early Paleozoic, New Hampshire was covered by a warm, shallow sea that would come to be inhabited by creatures like brachiopods, bryozoans, corals, crinoids, and trilobites. Geologic forces raised the local elevation during the Devonian, and local sediments were eroded away from the state rather than deposited, leading to a gap in the local rock record. Erosion continued through the Mesozoic and the early to mid Cenozoic, leaving few rocks of that age, and no fossils. By the Ice Age, the state was being worked over by glaciers and had similar wildlife to the modern Canadian Arctic.

New Hampshire fossils had attracted scientific attention by the late 1800s when C. H. Hitchcock reported local invertebrate remains preserved near Littleton. Other notable finds include fossils preserved in metamorphic rock that are still recognizable despite the extreme geologic forces exerted on these rocks.

== Prehistory ==
New Hampshire has no fossil record dating before or to the early Paleozoic. This is because all of the local rocks that formed during this interval are either igneous or heavily metamorphosed. However, it can be easily inferred based on data from the neighboring states that New Hampshire was probably covered by a warm shallow sea. Silurian New Hampshire was home to creatures like brachiopods, bryozoans, corals, crinoids, and trilobites. These all left their remains in what is now a stratigraphic unit called the Fitch Formation at a site 1.7 miles (2.7 km) northwest of Littleton. Four other sites in the Fitch Formation bear fossils in New Hampshire apart from the one northwest of Littleton. One is a source of crinoid columnals 2.3 miles (3.7 km) west of Littleton along the Ammonoosuc River. One mile northeast of Lisbon is another source of crinoid columnals. Two miles northeast of Lisbon crinoid columnals and chain corals can be found preserved in marble on the eastern bank of the Ammonoosuc River. Lastly, an additional source of crinoid columnals exists a mile west of Franconia.

Forces of geological uplift triggered a mountain-building episode during the Devonian. Devonian New Hampshire was home to branchiopods, crinoids, and gastropods. Sites where these types of Devonian fossils have been found include the Tip Top Farm 3.5 miles (5.6 km) west of Littleton and Mormon Hill 6 miles (10 km) to the southwest of Littleton. Another source of contemporary fossils is located two miles west of Whitefield on the northeastern side of Dalton Mountain. Uplift continued throughout the Carboniferous and Permian. As this uplift proceeded local sediments started eroding away rather than being deposited, so New Hampshire has no rock record from this interval of time in which fossils might have been preserved.

Erosion continued into the Mesozoic, so the state has almost no rock record from this entire era of geologic time. The few rocks present were igneous and likely formed as a result of the rifting that divided Pangaea. No dinosaur fossils have ever been discovered in New Hampshire. No other fossils are known from this scant rock record either. Local erosion continued into the Cenozoic era. There is no local rock record for the entirety of the Tertiary. During the more recent Quaternary, New Hampshire was largely covered by glaciers. The local plant life resembled that of modern arctic Canada. This is supported by fossil plants and pollen preserved in sediments deposited when the glaciers melted. Large megafauna roamed the area during interglacial periods, such as woolly mammoths and mastodons.

== History ==
In 1873, C. H. Hitchcock first reported the Silurian brachiopods, bryozoans, corals, crinoids, and trilobites discovered 1.7 miles (2.7 km) northwest of Littleton to the scientific literature. In the twentieth century, between 1912 and 1913, New Hampshire's Devonian branchiopods, crinoids, and gastropods were first reported to the scientific literature by F. H. Lahee. Several decades later, in 1958, geologists made a fossil discovery in the far western region of New Hampshire that they regarded as wholly "unique". They had observed a stratigraphic horizon rich in brachiopod shells that were still "generally identifiable" despite being subject to metamorphism. The shells were often disarticulated, likely due to the action of ancient currents. The rocks preserving this unusual find consist of a unit of "coarsely crystalline calcite in a matrix of quartz, hornblende, and other minerals" called the Clough Formation. It likely dates back to the Early Silurian. In 2013, fossils belonging to a mastodon were found off the Isles of Shoals, while in 2014 a mammoth tooth was found. There was an unsuccessful push to designate American mastodon as the state fossil.

A skull cast of the mosasaur Tylosaurus is displayed in James Hall at the University of New Hampshire, Durham.

== People ==
James Hall died in Bethlehem on August 7, 1898.

== Natural history museums ==
- The Little Nature Museum at Gould Hill Orchards, Hopkinton
- Squam Lakes Natural Science Center, Holderness
- Woodman Institute, Dover

== See also ==
- Paleontology in Maine
- Paleontology in Massachusetts
- Paleontology in Vermont
