= List of fossiliferous stratigraphic units in Virginia =

This article contains a list of fossil-bearing stratigraphic units in the state of Virginia, U.S.

== Sites ==
| Group or Formation | Period | Notes |
|---|---|---|
| Acredale Formation | Neogene | |
| Allegheny Formation | Carboniferous | |
| Aquia Formation | Paleogene | |
| Athens Formation | Ordovician | |
| Bays Formation | Ordovician | |
| Benbolt Formation | Ordovician | |
| Big Stone Gap Shale | Carboniferous | |
| Bloomsburg Formation | Silurian | |
| Bluefield Shale | Carboniferous | |
| Bluestone Formation | Carboniferous | |
| Bowen Formation | Ordovician | |
| Brallier Formation | Devonian | |
| Bull Run Formation | Triassic | |
| Calvert Formation | Neogene | |
| Cassville Shales | Permian | |
| Chambersburg Formation | Ordovician | |
| Charleston Sandstone | Carboniferous | |
| Chemung Formation | Devonian | |
| Chepultepec Formation | Ordovician | |
| Choptank Formation | Neogene | |
| Eastover Formation | Neogene | |
| Old Church Formation | Neogene, Paleogene | |
| Chickahominy Formation | Paleogene | |
| Cliffield Formation | Ordovician | |
| Keefer Sandstone | Silurian | |
| Rochester Shale | Silurian | |
| Rose Hill Formation | Silurian | |
| Price Formation | Carboniferous | |
| Conemaugh Group/Ames | Carboniferous | |
| Ames Limestone | Carboniferous | |
| Glenshaw Formation | Carboniferous | |
| Conococheague Formation | Cambrian | |
| Cotter Formation | Ordovician | |
| Cove Creek Limestone | Carboniferous | |
| Cow Branch Formation | Triassic | |
| Doswell Formation | Triassic | |
| Eastover Formation | Neogene | |
| Edinburgh Formation | Ordovician | |
| Eggleston Formation | Ordovician | |
| Fido Sandstone | Carboniferous | |
| Foreknobs Formation | Devonian | |
| Frederick Limestone | Cambrian | |
| Gasper Limestone | Carboniferous | |
| Gilmore Formation | Permian | |
| Gratton Limestone | Ordovician | |
| Greene Formation | Permian | |
| Hampshire Formation | Devonian | |
| Hillsdale Limestone | Carboniferous | |
| Hinton Formation | Carboniferous | |
| Huntersville Formation | Devonian | |
| Kanawha Formation | Carboniferous | |
| Kempsville Formation | Neogene | |
| Keyser Limestone | Silurian | |
| Lantz Mills Formation | Ordovician | |
| Lenoir Limestone and Mosheim Limestone | Ordovician | |
| Liberty Hall Formation | Ordovician | |
| Lilydale Shale | Carboniferous | |
| Lincolnshire Limestone | Ordovician | |
| Little Valley Formation | Carboniferous | |
| Longview Formation | Ordovician | |
| Manassas Sandstone | Triassic | |
| Martinsburg Formation | Ordovician | |
| Mauch Chunk Formation/Reynolds Limestone | Carboniferous | |
| McKenzie Formation | Silurian | |
| Midland Formation | Jurassic | |
| Millboro Shale | Devonian | |
| Moccasin Formation | Ordovician | |
| Monongahela Formation | Carboniferous | |
| Nanjemoy Formation | Paleogene | |
| Nineveh Formation | Permian | |
| Nolichucky Formation | Cambrian | |
| Norfolk Formation | Neogene | |
| Ohio Shale | Devonian | |
| Old Church Formation | Neogene, Paleogene | |
| Onondaga Formation | Devonian | |
| Oranda Formation | Ordovician | |
| Oriskany Formation | Devonian | |
| Otterdale Formation | Triassic | |
| Patapsco Formation | Cretaceous | |
| Patuxent Formation | Cretaceous | |
| Piney Point Formation | Paleogene | |
| Pennington Formation | Carboniferous | |
| Pocono Formation | Carboniferous | |
| Pocono Mountain Formation | Carboniferous | |
| Powell Formation | Ordovician | |
| Price Sandstone | Carboniferous | |
| Rockdale Run Formation | Ordovician | |
| Rockport Formation | Permian | |
| Romney Formation | Devonian | |
| Roubidoux Formation | Ordovician | |
| Shady Dolomite | Cambrian | |
| St. Louis Limestone | Carboniferous | |
| St. Marys Formation | Neogene | |
| Ste. Genevieve Limestone | Carboniferous | |
| Tonoloway Limestone | Silurian | |
| Trenton Formation | Ordovician | |
| Wardell Formation | Ordovician | |
| Washington Formation | Permian, Carboniferous | |
| Waynesburg Formation | Permian | |
| Whitesburg Formation | Ordovician | |
| Williamsport Sandstone | Silurian | |
| Wills Creek Formation | Silurian | |
| Witten Limestone | Ordovician | |
| Yorktown Formation | Neogene | |

== See also ==
- Paleontology in Virginia
