= Pennington Formation =

- Stratigraphic range: Carboniferous
- Type: Formation

Location
- Region: Virginia
- Country: United States

The Pennington Formation is a geologic formation named for Pennington Gap, Virginia. It can be found in outcrops along Pine Mountain and Cumberland Mountain in Kentucky, Virginia, and Tennessee, where it is the uppermost Mississippian-age formation. The name has also been applied to similar Mississippian strata in the Cumberland Escarpment of eastern Kentucky, though the rocks in that area were later renamed to the Paragon Formation.

According to general usage among geologists, the Pennington Formation corresponds to shales, sandstones, and thin limestone beds located above the highest massive limestone bed of the Newman Formation. Paleosols have also been preserved in a Pennington outcrop at Pound Gap, recording a series of fluctuations in climate between dry and wet conditions. The Pennington Formation has been inferred to represent a coastal environment transitioning between a Mississippian marine basin and Pennsylvanian coal swamps.

Some parts of the Pennington Formation preserve fossils, including conodonts which are useful for biostratigraphic dating. Conodont dating indicates that the Pennington Formation formed near the end of the Mississippian subperiod of the Carboniferous period. The Pennington Formation is considered equivalent to the Hinton, Princeton, and Bluestone formations of the Mauch Chunk Group, which is exposed further north in West Virginia.

== See also ==
- List of fossiliferous stratigraphic units in Virginia
- Paleontology in Virginia

== Bibliography ==
- Various Contributors to the Paleobiology Database. "Fossilworks: Gateway to the Paleobiology Database". Archived from the original on 25 March 2022.
