= Bluefield Formation =

Geologic formation in West Virginia, United States

- Stratigraphic range: Late Visean?-Early Serpukhovian; ~323.5–326.5 Ma
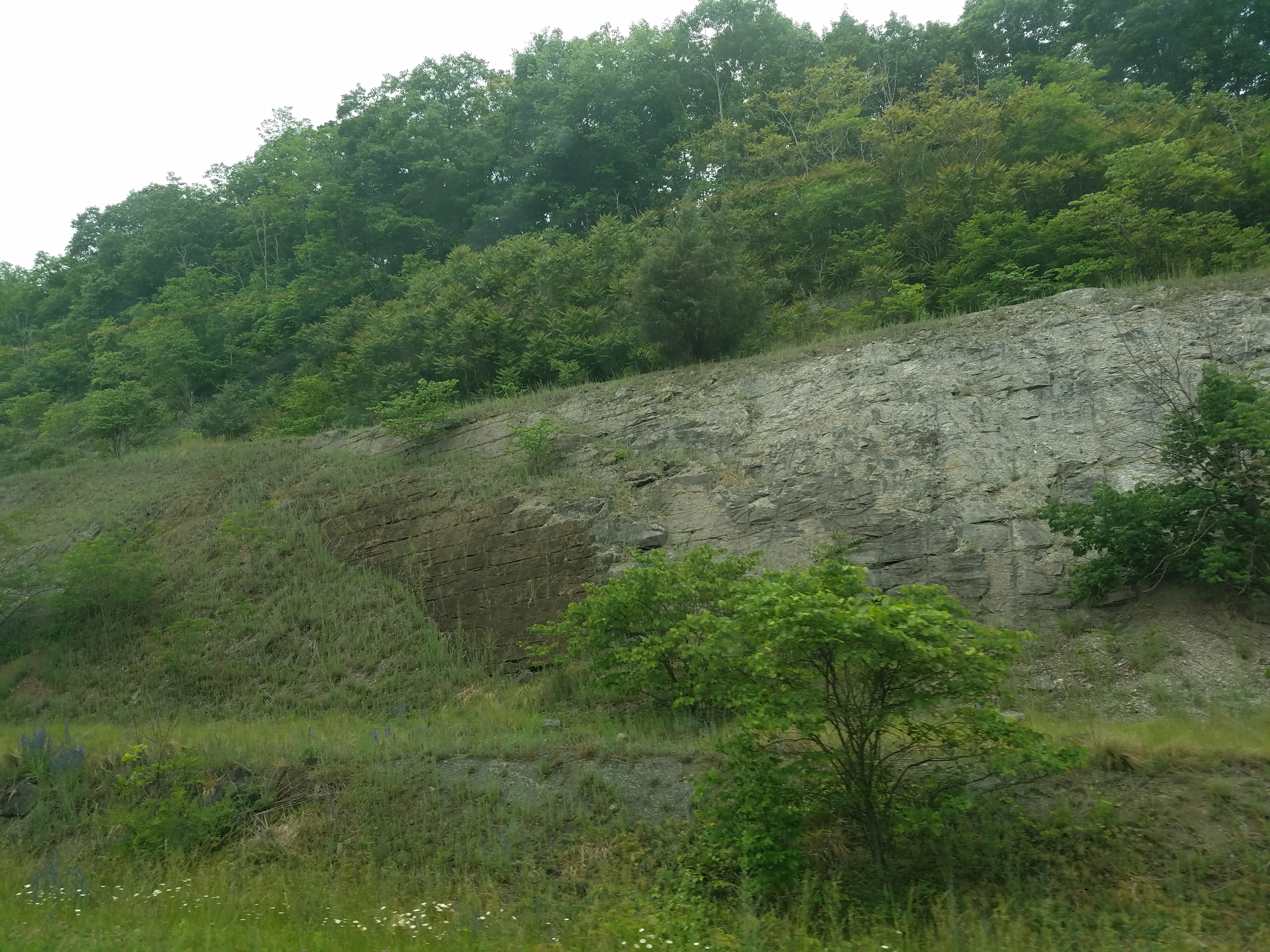
- Outcrop near Glen Lyn, Virginia
- Type: Formation
- Unit of: Mauch Chunk Group
- Sub-units: Coney Member, Clayton Member, Graham Member, Bertha Member, Bradshaw Member, Indian Mills Member, Raines Corner Member, Possumtrot Shale, Droop Sandstone, Talcott Shale, Ada Shale, Reynolds Limestone, Bickett Shale, Webster Springs Sandstone, Glenray Limestone, Lillydale Shale
- Underlies: Hinton Formation
- Overlies: Greenbrier Group

Lithology
- Primary: Mudstone, limestone, sandstone
- Other: Conglomerate, coal

Location
- Region: Appalachia and Southeastern United States
- Country: United States
- Extent: Virginia, West Virginia, Pennsylvania?, Maryland?, Kentucky?

Type section
- Named for: Bluefield, West Virginia
- Named by: Campbell, 1896

The Bluefield Formation is a geologic formation in West Virginia. It preserves fossils dating back to the Mississippian subperiod of the Carboniferous period. Sediments of this age formed along a large marine basin lying in the region of what is now the Appalachian Plateau. The Bluefield Formation is the lowest section of the primarily siliciclastic Mauch Chunk Group, underlying the Stony Gap Sandstone Member of the Hinton Formation and overlying the limestone-rich Greenbrier Group.

== History ==
As with many other units in southeast West Virginia, the Bluefield Formation was first named by Campbell (1896). At the time it was called the "Bluefield Shale". Reger & Price (1926) later renamed it to the Bluefield Group and supplied an extensive list of subunits. Subsequent publications further altered the name to Bluefield Formation while also naming the encompassing Mississippian sequence as the Mauch Chunk Group. As originally designated, the Bluefield Formation pertained to an area in southeast West Virginia encompassed by Mercer, Monroe, and Summers counties, as well as a few exposures in Virginia adjacent to those counties.

Further north in West Virginia, Mauch Chunk strata becomes thinner. Some geologists refrain from subdividing the Mauch Chunk Group north of Randolph County, and rename it to the Mauch Chunk Formation in northern exposures. However, others retain separate formations in the northern exposures, including the Bluefield Formation. Since the Mauch Chunk Group extends into parts of Maryland and Pennsylvania, the Bluefield Formation (or equivalent strata) may be identified in those areas as well. Equivalent strata is also found in southwest Virginia and southeast Kentucky as the upper part of the Newman Limestone.

== Geology ==
=== Sequences and cycles ===
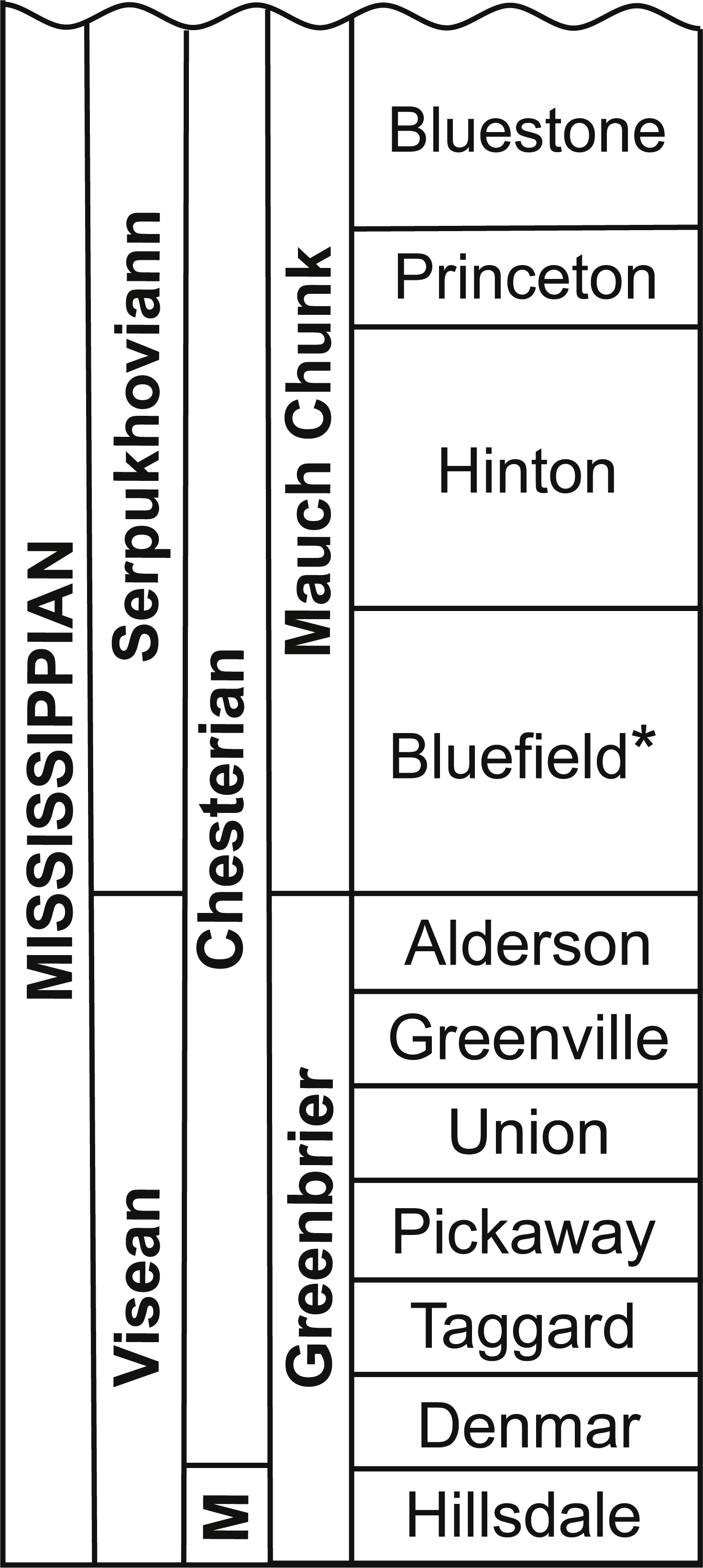
Stratigraphic position of the Bluefield Formation in the Mauch Chunk Group

The Bluefield Formation can be subdivided into four lithological units or "packages" at its thickest extent. The oldest two packages are primarily grey shale and fossiliferous limestone, while the younger two packages are primarily siltstone, sandstone, and red mudstone. Four distinct types of sediment deposition and flooding cycles are preserved, labelled types A-D. Type A and B cycles are most common in the younger packages and type C and D cycles are most common in the older packages. These cycles and sequences of the Bluefield Formation are most well preserved at the depocenter of the Bluefield Formation, at the eastern edge of Mercer County, West Virginia. Here, at least 28 cycles have been tracked. Elsewhere they may be incomplete due to erosion within the basin as it was experiencing deposition.

Type A cycles involve fine black shale grading upwards to brown laminated mudstone, then thickly-bedded red mudstone and mud-cracked siltstone layers, before a flood event returns the area to carbonate-rich mudstone. Ostracods, root casts, and intense bioturbation were common in many layers. Coal fragments are found in the basal black shale layers. Carbonate nodules and slickensides were present in red mudstone, indicating that they were vertisols. Type A cycles represent brackish lagoons which were able to dry out into mudflats in a hot, semi-arid climate. The mudflats accumulated soil, as well as streams that formed silty crevasse splay deposits.

Type B cycles were similar to type A cycles but were thicker and differed in other ways. The basal black shale is richer in coal and grades into siltier brown mudstone and then interbedded layers of siltstone, sandstone, and silty mudstone. The top of a cycle is characterized by a thick layer of rippling cross-bedded sandstone filled with root casts. Type B cycles represent a delta influenced by tides which alternate the supply of fine and coarse sediments. However, bioturbation makes it difficult to precisely track tidal forces. The top of a cycle preserves a sandbar in the process of being colonized by plants. Once seawater re-submerges the area and starts a new cycle, plants contribute to the richness of coal within the basal shale.

Type C cycles begin with bioturbated mudstone which abruptly transitions into a thick sequence of limestone. The limestone can be characterized as thin layers of fossil-rich grainstone interbedding with broader layers of packstone. Rarely, brown laminated mudstone may be present above the limestone. The upper part of the cycle involves conglomerate covered by sandstone and siltstone filled with plant fragments, ripple marks, and occasionally tetrapod footprints. In type C cycles, a transgression floods a mudflat and allows it to be colonized by marine organisms. Repeated storm event lead to alternating limestone grain size, and eventually tidally-influenced sandbars manifest as the shoreline shifts back.

Type D cycles primarily involve a thick sequence of laminated mudstone grading from shale to siltstone. The sequence is occasionally interrupted by fossil-rich packstone which grades upwards into mudstone. The thickest packstone layer is often located at the top of the sequence, though dolomite-rich mudstone may lie in its place. Type D cycles are entirely marine deposits found on the continental shelf of the ancient marine basin. Though this is a mostly stable environment, it is regularly disrupted by storms (forming siltstone) and turbidity flows (forming packstone). The gradual increase in sediment size is tied to a regressing coastline, allowing shallow-water sediments to influence the environment more.

Collectively, the cycles and "packages" of the Bluefield Formation represent a series of large-scale sea level changes, each lasting several hundred thousand years. This data is consistent with identifying each package as a fourth-order sequence. This likely means that they are tied to glacial periods as the earth was transitioning from a greenhouse to icehouse climate. The individual sediment cycles represent smaller-scale (50-100 thousand year) glacial sea level fluctuations, also known fifth-order sequences or parasequences. The upper two packages of the Bluefield Formation have more parasequences and more coal near the depocenter, but areas further away (towards the basin margin) had fewer parasequences and less coal. This indicates that the basin margins had less subsidence compared to the depocenter. The relatively larger impact of sea level changes leads to more erosion along the basin margin, allowing many parasequences and coal beds to be eroded away completely.

== Paleobiota ==
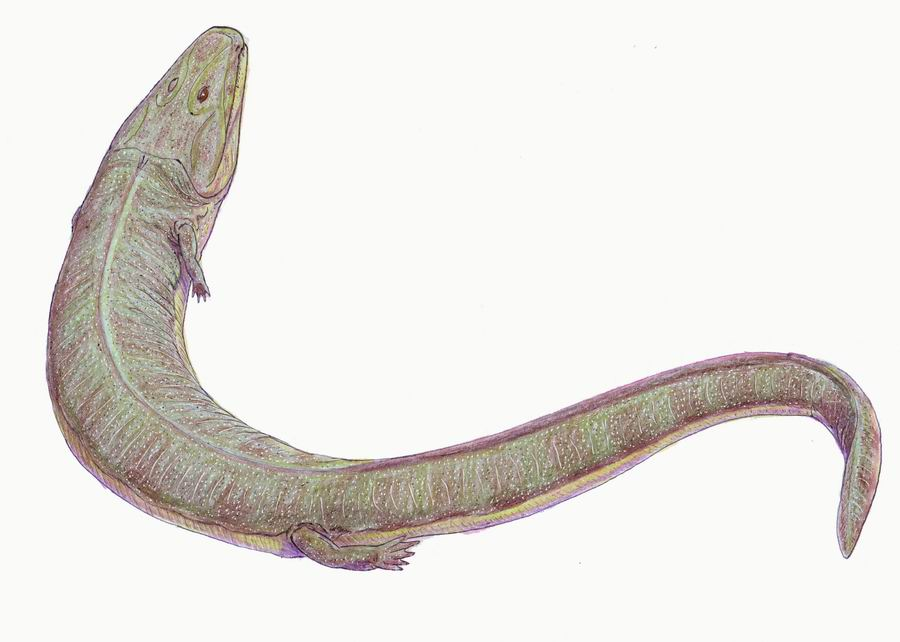
Greererpeton, a colosteid from strata in Greer, West Virginia equivalent to the Bickett Shale member of the Bluefield Formation

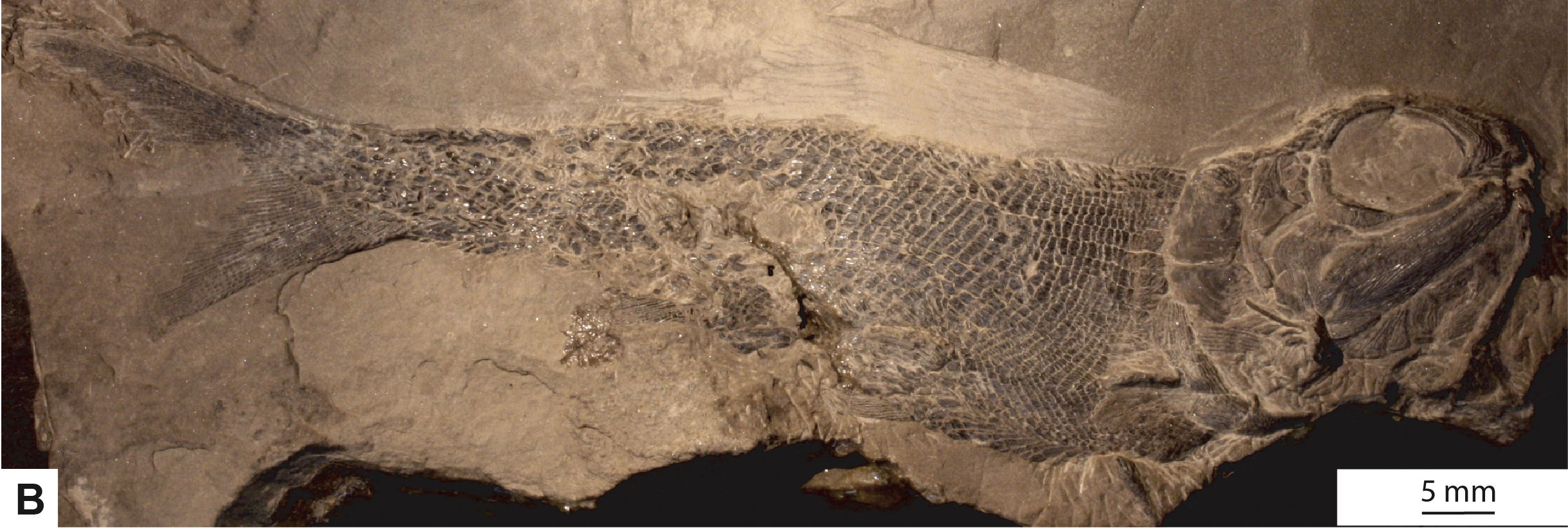
Bluefieldius, a fish found in delta sediments near the depocenter of the Bluefield Formation in Mercer County, West Virginia

Fossils are common in limestone and shale layers of the Bluefield Formation. In the region of southeast West Virginia (and neighboring parts of Virginia) for which the Bluefield Formation was named, invertebrates are by far the most common fossils. These include a diverse assortment of bryozoans, brachiopods, bivalves, gastropods, corals, trilobites, ostracods, crinoids, and blastoids. Only one site in southeast West Virginia has produced vertebrate material. This site is a highway roadcut located across the state line from Glen Lyn, Virginia. It preserves a tidal deltaic sequence near the middle of the Bluefield Formation. Tetrapod trackways from this site have been given the species name Hylopus hamesi, and were likely made by Proterogyrinus or a closely related animal. The site has also produced a single complete skeleton of a basal actinopterygiian fish, the holotype of Bluefieldius mercerensis.

The tentatively assigned northern exposures of the Bluefield Formation are also fossiliferous, preserving the same types of invertebrates as the southern exposures. Bivalves are particularly well-studied in the northern exposures. Among the most famous northern Mauch Chunk site is the Greer limestone quarry in Monongalia County, West Virginia. Exposures at this site have been equated with sediment units from the lower half of the Bluefield Formation, from the Lillydale Shale up to the Droop Sandstone. Apart from numerous invertebrates, a prominent vertebrate fauna is also known from the Bickett Shale of the Bluefield Formation at Greer. Preserved vertebrate fossils include acanthodians, lungfish, rhizodonts, and articulated tetrapod remains. Several new tetrapod genera have been named from Greer: Greererpeton (a colosteid), Proterogyrinus (a basal embolomere), and Mauchchunkia (a synonym of Proterogyrinus).

== See also ==
- List of fossiliferous stratigraphic units in West Virginia
- List of fossiliferous stratigraphic units in Virginia
