= Bowen Formation =

Geological formation in the United States

- Stratigraphic range: Late Ordovician
- Type: Formation
- Underlies: Witten Formation
- Overlies: Wardell Formation

Lithology
- Primary: mudrock, sandstone
- Other: limestone, shale

Location
- Region: Virginia
- Country: United States

Type section
- Named for: Bowen Cove, Tazewell County
- Named by: Cooper & Prouty, 1943

The Bowen Formation is an Ordovician-age geological formation in the Appalachian region of the eastern United States. It occupies a thin stratigraphic range between the Wardell and Witten formations in some areas of southwest Virginia and northeast Tennessee. It is particularly well-exposed in Tazewell County, Virginia. Unlike its encompassing strata, the Bowen Formation is mostly calcareous sandstone and mudrock rather than limestone. The thicker upper part of the formation is composed of layered red mudrock which is replete with mudcracks. The thinner lower part, which is not always preserved, is a coarser unit of dark grey stratified sandstone which weathers to a rusty-brown color. Fossils are rare, restricted to stromatolites and Tetradium fibratum (a coral-like colonial organism).

The Bowen Formation was probably formed by a small lobe of a delta flowing northeast onto the carbonate platforms of the area. Mudcracks indicate that the sediments were partially exposed to the air. Shortly after deposition of the Witten Formation, similar conditions would return in force with the thick coastal red beds of the Moccasin Formation.

== See also ==
- List of fossiliferous stratigraphic units in Virginia
- Paleontology in Virginia
