= Oranda Formation =

Geologic formation in Virginia, United States

- Stratigraphic range: Ordovician
- Type: sedimentary

Location
- Region: Virginia
- Country: United States

Type section
- Named for: Oranda, Virginia
- Named by: Cooper and Cooper, 1946

The Oranda Formation is a geologic formation in Virginia. It preserves fossils dating back to the Ordovician period.

This nomenclature is not in current usage. It has been reallocated to Stickley Run Member of the Martinsburg Formation and Edinburg Formation in Virginia and West Virginia, and to the Martinsburg and Chambersburg Formation in Pennsylvania.

== See also ==
- List of fossiliferous stratigraphic units in Virginia
- Paleontology in Virginia
