= List of the prehistoric life of Rhode Island =

This list of the prehistoric life of Rhode Island contains the various prehistoric life-forms whose fossilized remains have been reported from within the US state of Rhode Island.

== Precambrian ==
The Paleobiology Database records no known occurrences of Precambrian fossils in Rhode Island.

== Paleozoic ==
- †Adeloblatta
  - †Adeloblatta gorhami – type locality for species
- †Anthracomartus
  - †Anthracomartus woodruffi – type locality for species
- †Aphelomylacris – tentative report
  - †Aphelomylacris modesta – type locality for species
- †Discoblatta
  - †Discoblatta scholfieldi – type locality for species
- †Dysmenes
  - †Dysmenes illustris – type locality for species
- †Etoblattina
  - †Etoblattina exilis – type locality for species
- †Gyroblatta
  - †Gyroblatta clarki – type locality for species
  - †Gyroblatta scapularis – type locality for species
- †Heolus – type locality for genus
  - †Heolus providentiae – type locality for species
- †Microblattina – type locality for genus
  - †Microblattina perdita – type locality for species
- †Mylacris
  - †Mylacris packardii – type locality for species
- †Paralogus – type locality for genus
  - †Paralogus aeschnoides – type locality for species
- †Phyloblatta
  - †Phyloblatta latebricola – type locality for species
- †Polycreagra – type locality for genus
  - †Polycreagra elegans – type locality for species
- †Pseudetoblattina
  - †Pseudetoblattina reliqua – type locality for species
- †Rhaphidiopsis – type locality for genus
  - †Rhaphidiopsis diversipenna – type locality for species
- †Xenoblatta
  - †Xenoblatta fraterna – type locality for species

== Mesozoic ==
The Paleobiology Database records no known occurrences of Mesozoic fossils in Rhode Island.

== Cenozoic ==
- †Anguinella
  - †Anguinella virginica
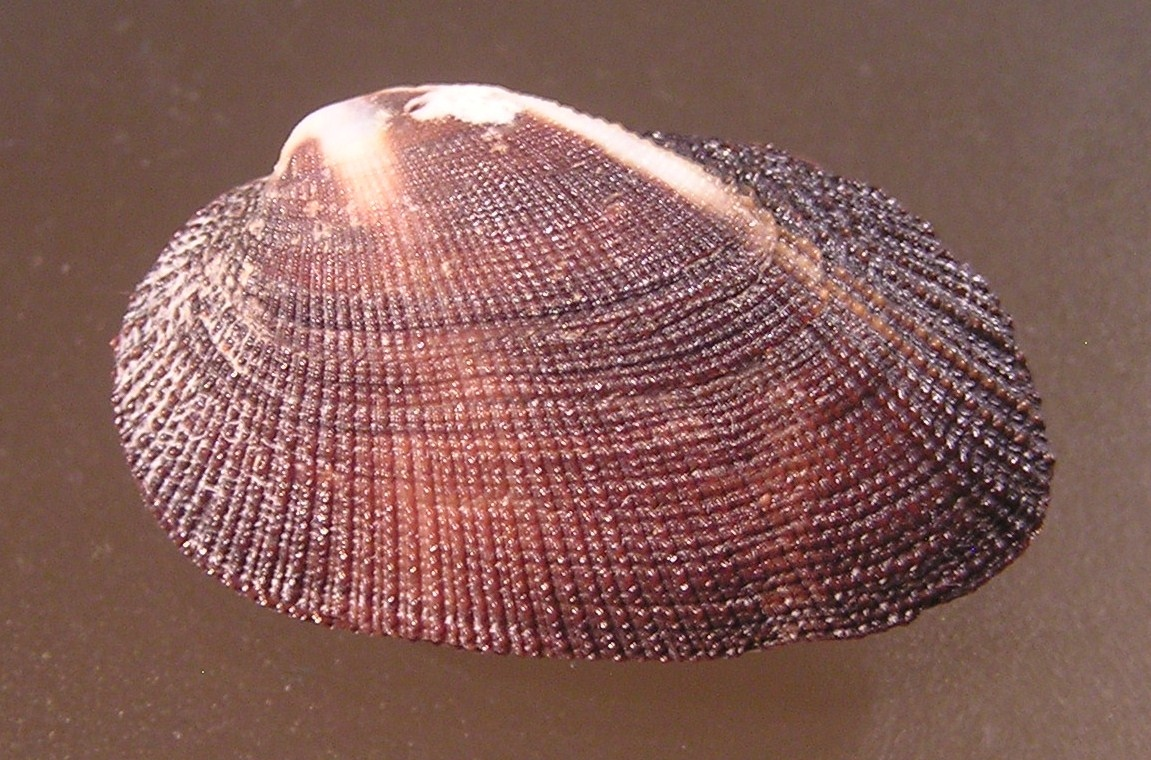
- Shell of a Barbatia, or bearded ark clam
  Barbatia
  - †Barbatia marylandica – or unidentified comparable form
- Caryocorbula
  - †Caryocorbula cuneata
- Cerithiopsis
  - †Cerithiopsis calvertensis – or unidentified comparable form
- Cerithium
- †Chesapecten
  - †Chesapecten jeffersonius – or unidentified comparable form
- Cliona
- Glossus
  - †Glossus mazlea – or unidentified comparable form
- †Mariacolpus
  - †Mariacolpus plebeia
- Nuculana
  - †Nuculana liciata
- Stewartia
  - †Stewartia anodonta – or unidentified comparable form
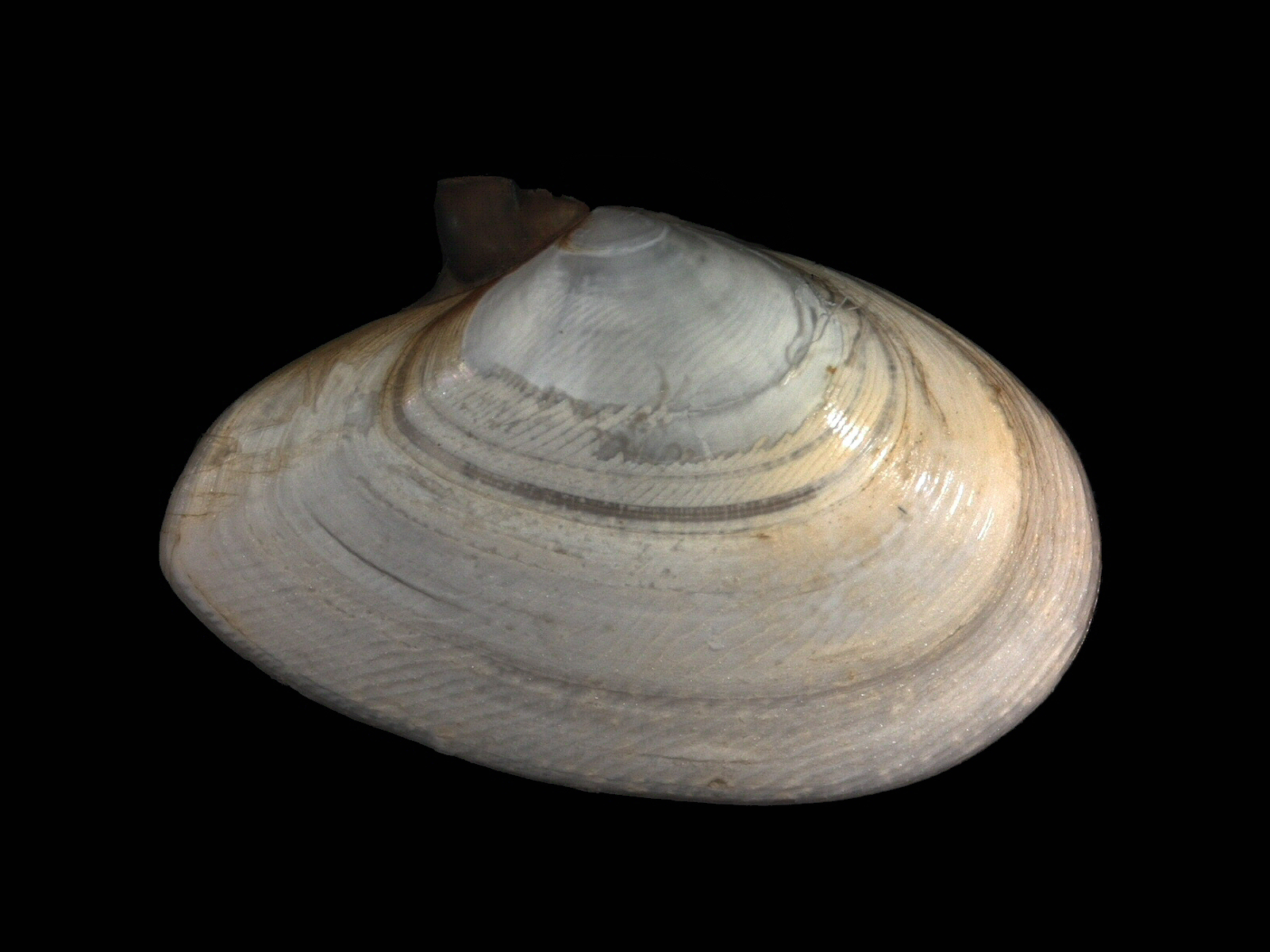
- Shell of a Tellina, or tellin
  Tellina
