= Cloyd Conglomerate =

Geologic group in Virginia, United States

- Stratigraphic range: Famennian
- Type: Group

Location
- Region: Appalachia and Southeastern United States
- Country: United States
- Extent: Virginia

The Cloyd Conglomerate is a geologic group in Virginia. It preserves fossils dating back to the Carboniferous period.

== See also ==
- List of fossiliferous stratigraphic units in Virginia
- Paleontology in Virginia
