= Gasper Limestone =

- Stratigraphic range: Carboniferous
- Type: Formation

Location
- Region: Virginia
- Country: United States

The Gasper Limestone is a geologic formation in Virginia. It preserves fossils dating back to the Carboniferous period.

== See also ==
- List of fossiliferous stratigraphic units in Virginia
- Paleontology in Virginia
