= Little Valley Formation =

Geologic formation in Virginia, United States

- Stratigraphic range: Viséan
- Type: Formation

Location
- Region: Virginia
- Country: United States

The Little Valley Formation is a geologic formation in Virginia, United States. It preserves fossils dating back to the Carboniferous period.

== See also ==
- List of fossiliferous stratigraphic units in Virginia
- Paleontology in Virginia
