= Frederick Limestone =

- Stratigraphic range: Cambrian
- Type: Formation

Location
- Region: Virginia
- Country: United States

The Frederick Limestone is a geologic formation in Maryland and Virginia. It preserves fossils dating back to the Cambrian period.

== See also ==
- List of fossiliferous stratigraphic units in Virginia
- Paleontology in Virginia
