= Pocono =

Pocono may refer to:

== Places ==
- Pocono Mountains, a mountainous region in northeastern Pennsylvania
- Pocono Creek, a tributary of Brodhead Creek in the Poconos
- Pocono Biological Laboratories, a company related to Sanofi pasteur
- Pocono Raceway, a superspeedway in the Poconos
- Pocono 400, a NASCAR race held at Pocono Raceway
- Pocono 500, a former IndyCar race held at Pocono Raceway
- Pocono Ridge, a neighborhood in Brookfield, Connecticut
- Pocono Mountain Formation, geologic formation in Virginia

== Other uses ==
- USS Pocono (AGC-16), a United States Navy amphibious force command ship in commission from 1945 to 1971
- Piper PA-35 Pocono, a twin-engined pressurized commuter airliner produced by Piper Aircraft. Only one built
- Pocono Airlines, regional airline
