= Chickahominy Formation =

- Stratigraphic range: Paleogene
- Type: Formation

Location
- Region: Virginia
- Country: United States

The Chickahominy Formation is a geologic formation in Virginia. It preserves fossils dating back to the Paleogene period.

== See also ==
- List of fossiliferous stratigraphic units in Virginia
- Paleontology in Virginia
