= Bays Formation =

Geologic formation in Virginia, United States

- Stratigraphic range: Ordovician
- Type: Formation

Location
- Region: Virginia
- Country: United States

The Bays Formation is a geologic formation in Virginia. It preserves fossils dating back to the Ordovician period.

== See also ==
- List of fossiliferous stratigraphic units in Virginia
- Paleontology in Virginia
