= Lincolnshire Limestone =

Lincolnshire Limestone may refer to

- Lincolnshire Limestone (England), a Middle Jurassic geological formation in the East Midlands of England
- Lincolnshire Limestone (Virginia), an Ordovician geological formation in Virginia, USA
