= Otterdale Formation =

Geologic formation in Virginia

- Stratigraphic range: Triassic
- Type: Geological Formation
- Unit of: Newark Supergroup

Location
- Region: Virginia
- Country: United States

Type section
- Named for: Otterdale, Chesterfield County, Virginia
- Named by: Shaler and Woodworth, 1899

The Otterdale Formation is a geologic formation in Virginia. It preserves fossils dating back to the Triassic period.

It was first identified at exposures near Otterdale, Chesterfield County, Virginia, within the Richmond Basin. Shaler and Woodworth described it as follows:

Coarse sandstones, often feldspathic, with silicified trunks of Araucarioxylon; well developed north, south, and west of Otterdale. Thickness, 500+ feet.

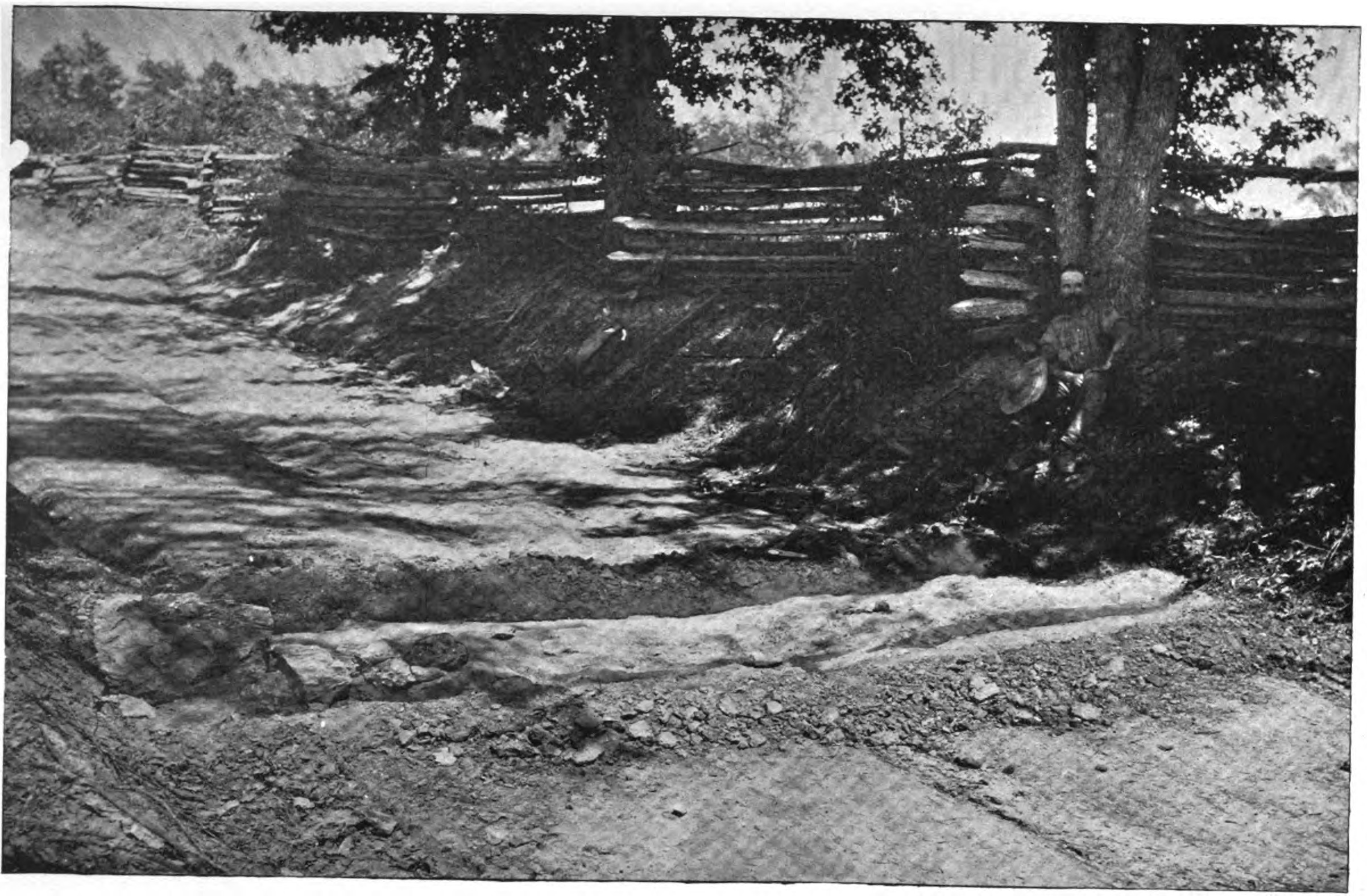
Petrified tree (Araucarioxylon sp.) on Otterdale Road in 1899.

== See also ==
- List of fossiliferous stratigraphic units in Virginia
- Paleontology in Virginia
