= Acredale Formation =

Geologic formation in Virginia, United States

- Stratigraphic range: Neogene
- Type: Formation

Location
- Region: Virginia
- Country: United States

The Acredale Formation is a geologic formation in Virginia. It preserves fossils dating back to the Neogene period.

== See also ==
- List of fossiliferous stratigraphic units in Virginia
- Paleontology in Virginia
