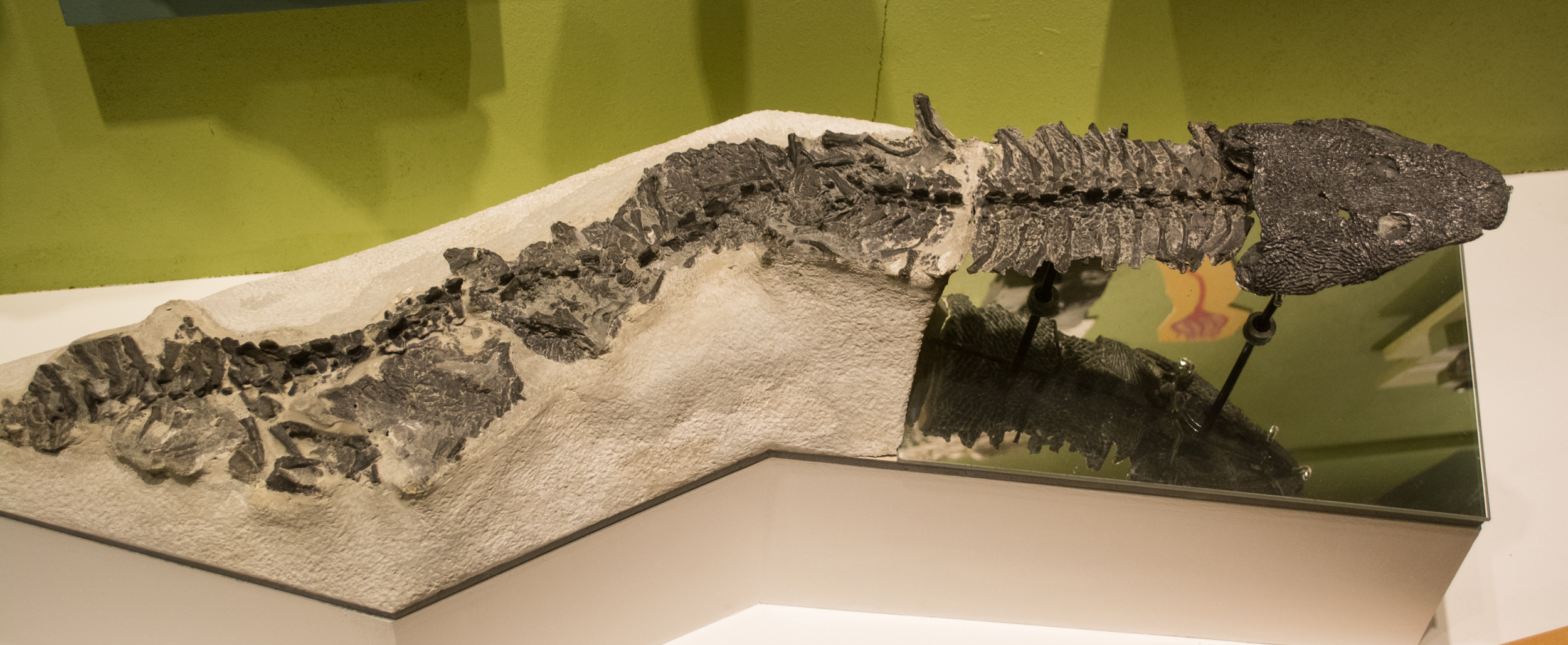
- Specimen CMNH 11090, one of the largest and most complete Greererpeton skeletons known

Scientific classification
- Kingdom: Animalia
- Phylum: Chordata
- Family: †Colosteidae
- Genus: †Greererpeton
- Species: †G. burkemorani

Binomial name
- †Greererpeton burkemorani Romer, 1969

= Greererpeton =

Greererpeton Temporal range: Viséan 345.3–328.3 Ma

Extinct genus of tetrapodomorphs

Greererpeton ("crawler from Greer, West Virginia") is an extinct genus of colosteid stem-tetrapods from the Early Carboniferous period (late Viséan) of North America. It contains a single species, G. burkemorani, first described by famed vertebrate paleontologist Alfred S. Romer in 1969, based on a skull and partial skeleton from the Bluefield Formation. The skull was redescribed by Timothy R. Smithson in 1982, while postcranial remains were redescribed by Stephen J. Godfrey in 1989.

== Description ==
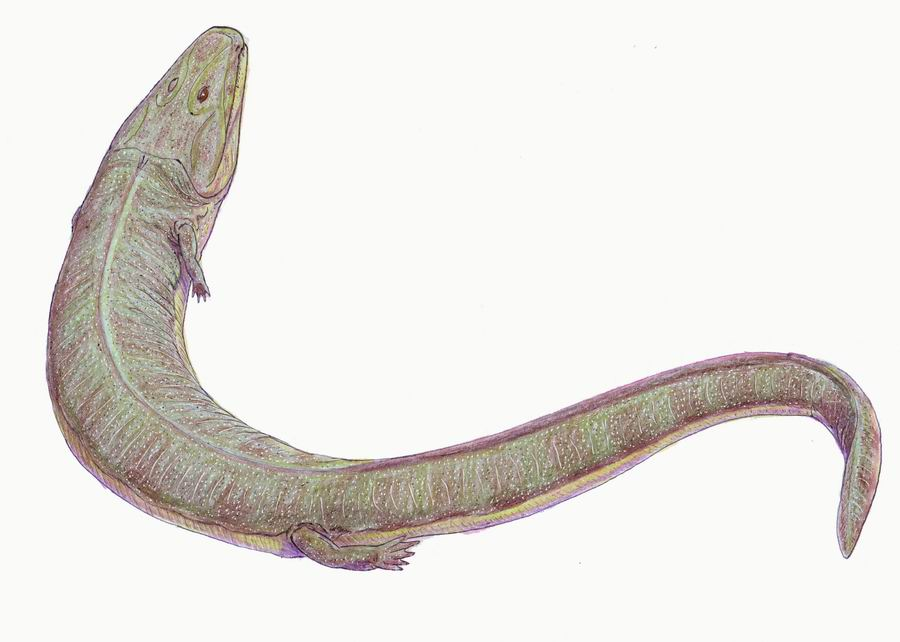
Life restoration

Greererpeton were probably aquatic, with an elongated body adapted for swimming. Adults have overall length of 1.0–1.4 metres (3.3–4.6 ft) or 1.5 metres (4.9 ft), similar in size to modern Asian giant salamanders (Andrias). The body was elongated, with about 40 vertebrae, while the flattened skull reached about 18 centimetres (7.1 in) long in adult specimens. The most complete adult specimen only preserved 12 tail vertebrae, only about a third the length of the body as in Andrias. However, smaller specimens have been found preserving over 30 vertebrae, so it is not inconceivable that a complete tail was approximately as long as the body. The limbs were short, though not vestigial; the fingers were still well-developed. Greererpeton were carnivores which probably lived in rivers and swamps.

== Paleobiology ==
Permo-Carboniferous tetrapodomorph limb bones, i is Greererpeton

There is a large amount of evidence that Greererpeton and other colosteids were completely aquatic animals. Grooves on the side of the skull indicate that Greererpeton had lateral lines, sensory organs commonly found only in fish and aquatic stem-tetrapods. The stapes bone at the rear of the skull is massive, probably used as a support for the skull. This contrasts with the stapes of terrestrial animals such as frogs, mammals, and lizards. In these groups the bone is thin and sensitive to vibration, so it is used for sensitive hearing. The thick stapes of Greererpeton is an indication that did not have good hearing like terrestrial animals. Greererpeton retains a postbranchial lamina on its shoulder blade, which may have been indicative of internal gills like those of fish. However, the erratic distribution of postbranchial laminae in aquatic and terrestrial fish and amphibians makes this conclusion questionable.

Godfrey (1989) considered Greererpeton to be biologically similar to the modern Asian giant salamanders (Andrias), the largest living amphibians. Preserved Greererpeton skeletons have their bodies lay completely flat, with their tails twisted over to lay flat perpendicular to the body. These preservational quirks may indicate that the body was flattened dorsoventrally (from top-to-bottom), while the tail was flattened mediolaterally (from side-to-side) into a fin-like structure used for swimming. Young Andrias congregate in shallow water while older individuals were bottom-dwelling predators preferring deeper rivers. Given that small Greererpeton skeletons have been found in groups while larger ones are solitary, it is presumable that Greererpeton behaved similarly.
