= Bluestone Formation =

Geologic formation in West Virginia, United States

- Stratigraphic range: Serpukhovian
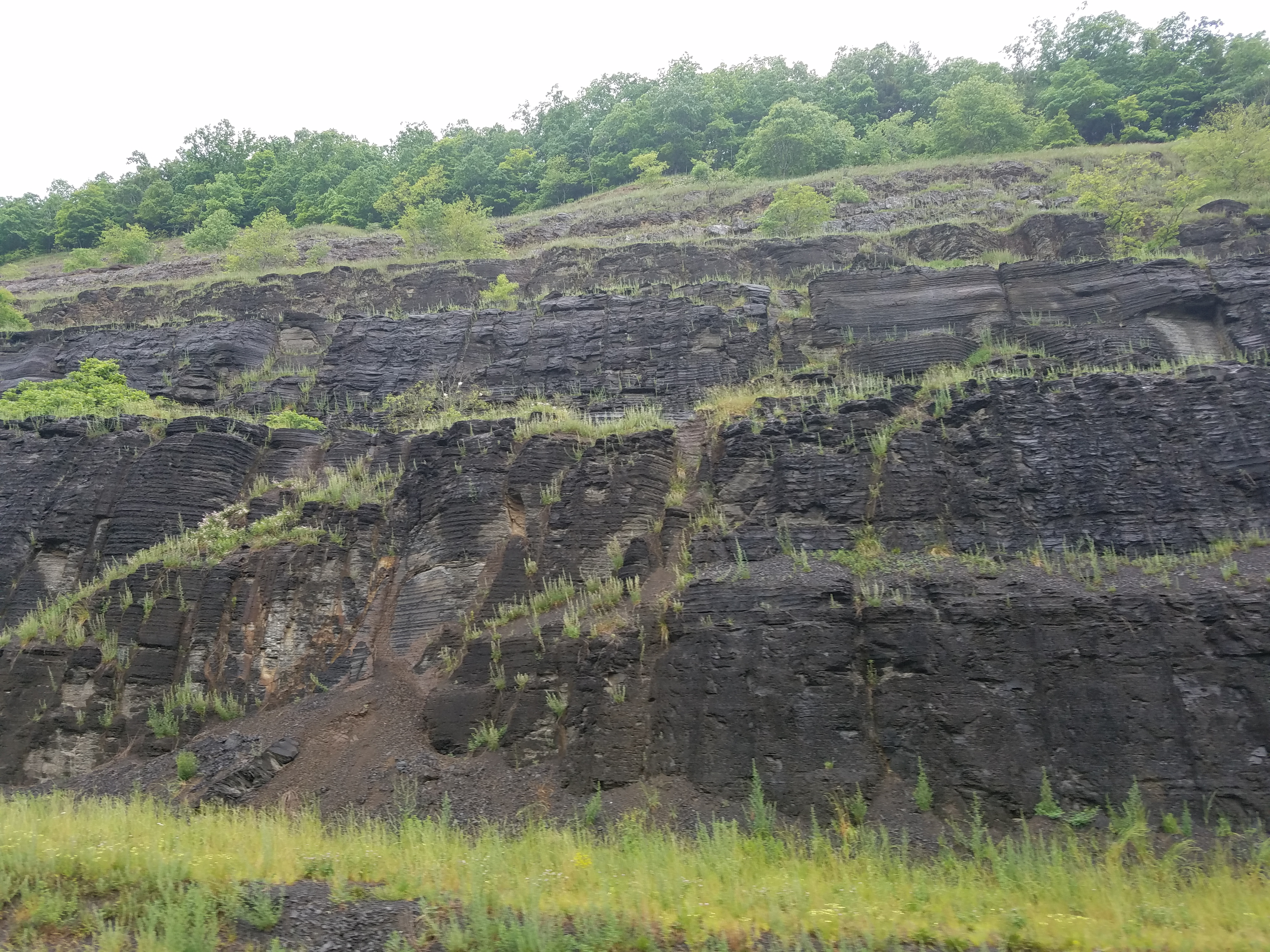
- Outcrop near Camp Creek, West Virginia, showing cyclical deposits of the Pride Shale Member
- Type: Formation
- Unit of: Mauch Chunk Group
- Sub-units: "upper member", Bramwell Member, "red member", "gray member", Glady Fork Sandstone Member, Pride Shale Member
- Underlies: Pocahontas Formation
- Overlies: Princeton Sandstone

Location
- Region: West Virginia
- Country: United States

The Bluestone Formation is a geologic formation in West Virginia. It is the youngest unit of the Upper Mississippian-age Mauch Chunk Group. A pronounced unconformity separates the upper boundary of the Bluestone Formation from sandstones of the overlying Pennsylvanian-age Pocahontas Formation.

== Fossils ==
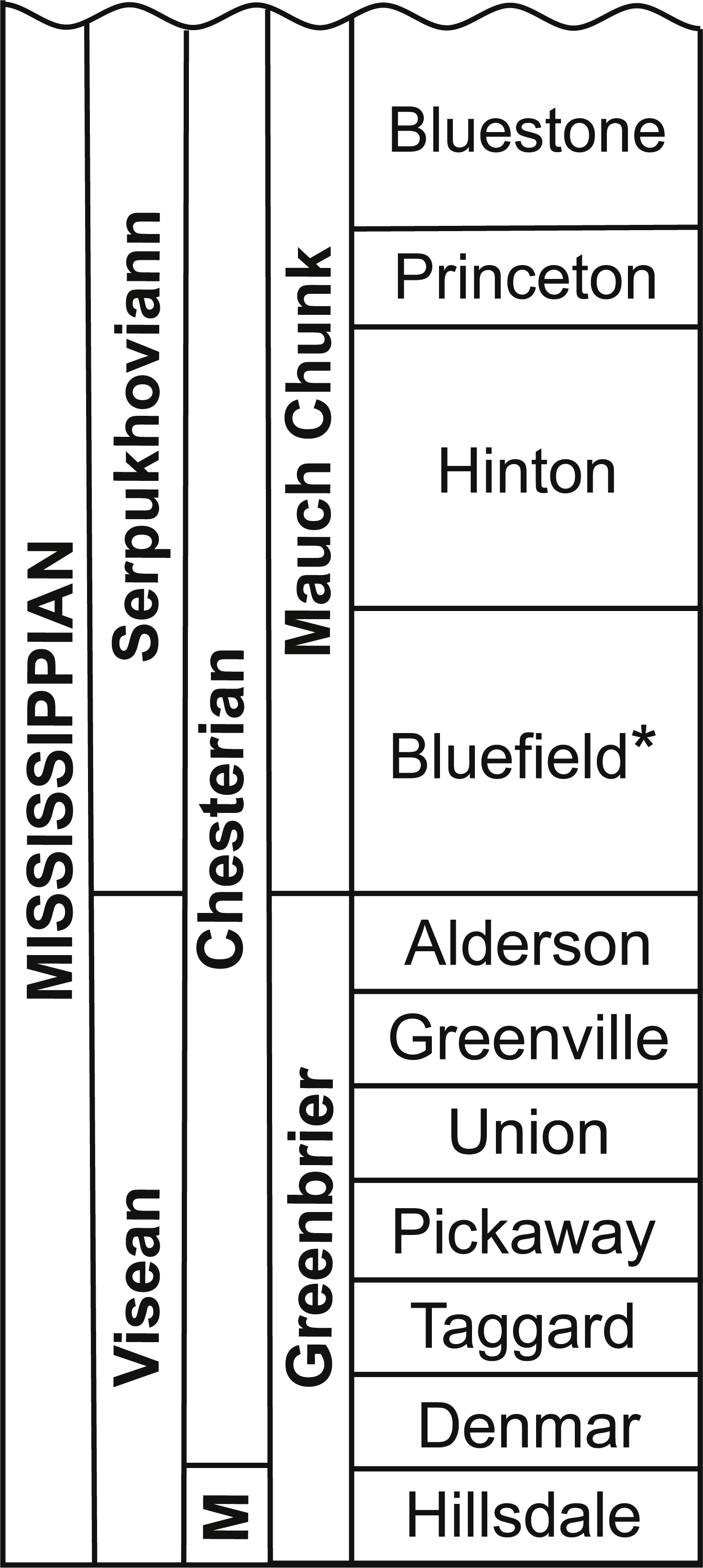
Stratigraphic position of the Bluestone Formation in the Mauch Chunk Group

Two formally named subunits of the Bluestone Formation, the Bramwell and Pride Shale Members, are quite fossiliferous. Plant fossils allow the top of the Bluestone Formation to be correlated with the Namurian A-Namurian B boundary, the European equivalent of the Mississippian-Pennsylvanian boundary. Conodonts belonging to the Adetognathus unicornis or lower Rhachistognathus muricatus conodont zones have been found in the Bramwell Member. This would make the Bluestone Formation the youngest occurrence of Mississippian-type conodonts in eastern North America. A diverse bivalve fauna was present in both the Bluestone Formation and the older Hinton Formation. Brachiopods were also fairly diverse, though not as dominant in the ecosystem as bivalves. Among the most abundant fossils were fossilized tubes of Microconchus hintonensis, a microconchid. The Pride Shale Member has produced Tanypterichthys pridensis, an endemic species of deep-bodied palaeonisciform fish.

== Deposition ==
The Pride Shale Member of the Bluestone Formation preserves interbedded variations in sediment coarseness. This variation is cyclical at multiple scales, with cycles from smaller than a millimeter to up to several meters in thickness. The smallest-scale cycles likely represent sediments settling out during daily tides. The largest-scale cycles are tied to changes in the tides influenced by the 18.6-year lunar nodal cycle. Cycles are also observed at half-year, monthly, and half-month scales. These correspond to seasonal changes, perigee/apogee tidal variation, and neap/spring tidal variation, respectively. Together, the different cycles reconstruct a deltaic environment near the equator which was heavily influenced by tides and a monsoonal climate. Modern equivalents would be the deltas of the Amazon, Ganges/Brahmaputra, and Fly rivers. During glacial periods, the monsoonal climate would have mellowed out into a less seasonal tropical climate in equatorial regions.

== See also ==
- List of fossiliferous stratigraphic units in West Virginia
