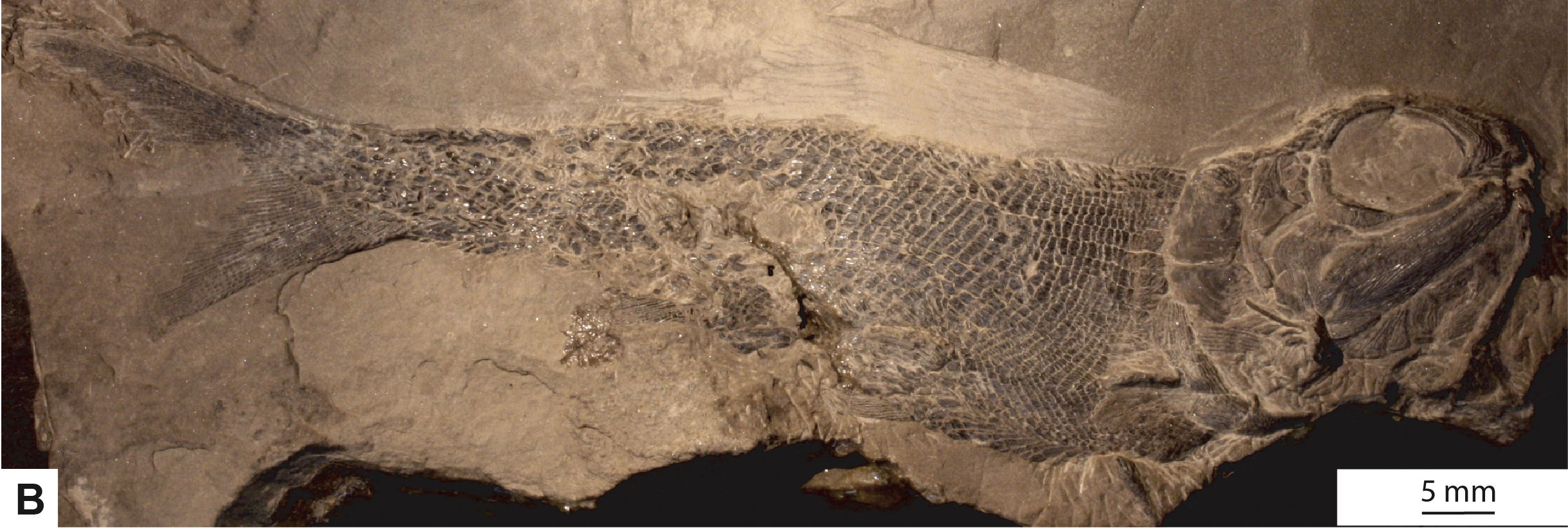
- Holotype specimen

Scientific classification
- Kingdom: Animalia
- Phylum: Chordata
- Class: Actinopterygii
- Genus: †Bluefieldius; Mickle, 2018
- Species: †B. mercerensis

Binomial name
- †Bluefieldius mercerensis Mickle, 2018

= Bluefieldius =

Bluefieldius Temporal range: Late Mississippian

Extinct genus of ray-finned fishes

Bluefieldius is an extinct genus of marine ray-finned fish that lived during the Late Mississippian (Early Carboniferous) epoch in what is now West Virginia, United States. It is known from a single fossil collected from the late Serpukhovian or early Viséan Bluefield Formation. The type and only species (monotypy) is Bluefieldius mercerensis.

It has a "palaeoniscoid" body plan, although as that order is thought to be paraphyletic, it was described as an indeterminate actinopterygian.
