= Princeton Sandstone =

Geologic formation in West Virginia

- Stratigraphic range: Mississippian
- Type: Formation
- Underlies: Bluestone Formation
- Overlies: Hinton Formation

Location
- Region: West Virginia
- Country: United States

The Princeton Sandstone is a geologic formation in West Virginia. It preserves fossils dating back to the Carboniferous period.

== See also ==
- List of fossiliferous stratigraphic units in West Virginia
