= New River Formation =

Geologic formation

- Stratigraphic range: Pennsylvanian
- Type: Formation
- Underlies: Kanawha Formation
- Overlies: Pocahontas Formation

Location
- Region: West Virginia
- Country: United States

The New River Formation is a geologic formation in West Virginia. It preserves fossils dating back to the Carboniferous period.
