= Moccasin Formation =

Geologic formation

- Stratigraphic range: Ordovician
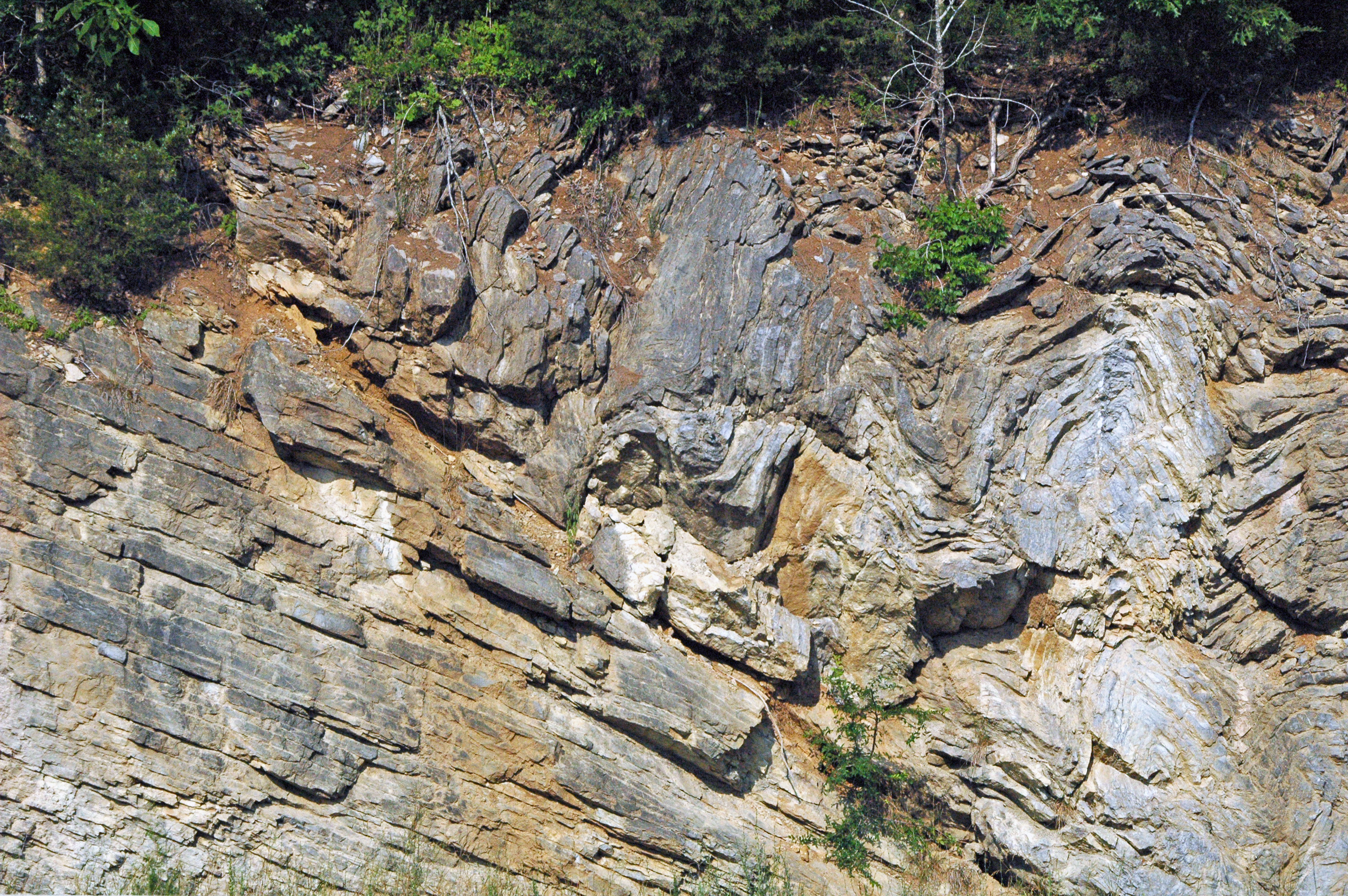
- Rome Formation over Moccasin Formation (Copper Creek Thrust Fault, Tennessee)
- Type: Formation

Lithology
- Primary: limestone

Location
- Region: Virginia, Tennessee
- Country: United States

The Moccasin Formation is a geologic formation in Virginia and Tennessee. It preserves fossils dating back to the Ordovician period.

== See also ==
- List of fossiliferous stratigraphic units in Virginia
- Paleontology in Virginia
