= Pocahontas Formation =

Geologic formation in West Virginia, United States

- Stratigraphic range: Pennsylvanian
- Type: Formation
- Underlies: New River Formation
- Overlies: Bluestone Formation

Location
- Region: West Virginia
- Country: United States

The Pocahontas Formation is a coal-bearing geologic formation in West Virginia. It preserves fossils dating back to the Carboniferous period.

The Pocahontas Formation contains sandstone, shale, and some coal.

It is overlain by the New River Formation, and is exposed in the New River Gorge.
