= Keyser Limestone Formation =

- Stratigraphic range: Silurian
- Type: Formation

Location
- Region: West Virginia
- Country: United States

The Keyser Limestone Formation is a geologic formation in West Virginia. It preserves fossils dating back to the Silurian period.

== See also ==
- List of fossiliferous stratigraphic units in West Virginia
