= Greer, West Virginia =

Greer
- Unincorporated community
- Location within the state of West Virginia Greer (the United States)
- Coordinates: 38°49′10″N 82°1′49″W
- Country: United States
- State: West Virginia
- County: Mason
- Elevation: 728 ft (222 m)
- Time zone: UTC-5 (Eastern (EST))
  - Summer (DST): UTC-4 (EDT)
- GNIS ID: 1539730

Greer is an unincorporated community in Mason County, West Virginia, United States.

The community derives its name from the local Greer Limestone Company.

The Mississippian tetrapod Greererpeton burkemorani was named after this community by Alfred Romer in 1969.
