= Cassville Shales =

Geologic formation in West Virginia, US

- Stratigraphic range: Permian
- Type: Formation

Location
- Region: West Virginia
- Country: United States

The Cassville Shales is a geologic formation in West Virginia. It preserves fossils dating back to the Permian period.

== See also ==
- List of fossiliferous stratigraphic units in West Virginia
