= Williamsport Formation =

Geologic formation in the United States

Williamsport Sandstone
- Stratigraphic range: Silurian
- Type: Formation
- Sub-units: Cedar Creek Limestone
- Underlies: Wills Creek Formation
- Overlies: McKenzie Formation

Lithology
- Primary: sandstone

Location
- Region: West Virginia, Pennsylvania, Virginia, Maryland
- Country: United States

The Williamsport Sandstone is a sandstone geologic formation in West Virginia, Virginia, Pennsylvania, and Maryland. The formation includes the Cedar Creek Limestone member. Near Cumberland, Maryland it includes the Cedar Creek Limestone member. It preserves fossils dating back to the Silurian period.

== See also ==
- List of fossiliferous stratigraphic units in West Virginia
