= List of fossiliferous stratigraphic units in West Virginia =

This article contains a list of fossil-bearing stratigraphic units in the state of West Virginia, U.S.

== Sites ==
Group or Formation	Period	Notes
Allegheny Formation	Carboniferous	
Antietam Formation	Cambrian	
Bloomsburg Formation	Silurian	
Bluefield Formation	Carboniferous	
Bluestone Formation	Carboniferous	
Cassville Shales	Permian	
Charleston Sandstone	Carboniferous	
Chemung Formation	Devonian	
Greenland Gap Group	Carboniferous	
Keefer Sandstone	Silurian	
Price Formation	Carboniferous	
Rochester Shale	Silurian	
Rose Hill Formation	Silurian	
Conemaugh Group	Carboniferous	
Ames Limestone		
Hampshire Formation	Devonian	
Glenshaw Formation	Carboniferous	
Greene Formation	Permian	
Waynesburg Formation	Permian	
Foreknobs Formation	Devonian	
Gilmore Formation	Permian	
Hampshire Formation	Devonian	
Hinton Formation	Carboniferous	
Kanawha Formation	Carboniferous	
Keyser Limestone Formation	Silurian	
Bluefield Formation	Carboniferous	
Lilydale Shale	Carboniferous	
Reynolds Limestone	Carboniferous	
McKenzie Formation	Silurian	
Pittsburgh Formation		
Nineveh Formation	Permian	
Onondaga Formation	Devonian	
Oriskany Formation	Devonian	
Pocono Formation	Carboniferous	
Rockdale Run Formation	Ordovician	
Rockport Formation	Permian	
Romney Formation	Devonian	
Tomstown Dolomite	Cambrian	
Tonoloway Limestone	Silurian	
Washington Formation	Permian	
Williamsport Sandstone	Silurian	
Wills Creek Limestone	Silurian	

== See also ==
- Paleontology in West Virginia
