= Kanawha Formation =

Geological formation in West Virginia, US

- Stratigraphic range: Pennsylvanian
- Type: Formation
- Underlies: Allegheny Formation
- Overlies: New River Formation

Location
- Region: West Virginia
- Country: United States

The Kanawha Formation is a geologic formation in West Virginia. It preserves fossils dating back to the Carboniferous period.

== See also ==
- List of fossiliferous stratigraphic units in West Virginia
