= Stratigraphic cycles =

Stratigraphic cycles refer to the transgressive and regressive sequences bounded by unconformities in the stratigraphic record on the cratons. These cycles represent a large scale eustasy cycle since the Cambrian period with further sub-divisions of those units.

== Divisions ==
Stratigraphic Cycle Orders
Type	Other Terms	Duration (in millions of years)
First-order	Supercycle	200-400
Second-order	Sequence or Synthem	10-100
Third-order	Mesothem	1-10
Fourth-order	Cyclothem	.2-.5

The division of these sequences were originally constructed in the Appalachian Basin and Cordilleran Basin of North America. Eventually these sequences were correlated in Russia and South America. The transgressive-regressive units show gaps in the rock records which indicate times of continual erosion and very little deposition. Local tectonics did not play a role in these global events, rather, a worldwide rise and fall of sea level (which is not to say that local tectonics have no influence on how the global events are expressed locally).

Smaller orders in stratigraphic cycles have also been proposed. Fifth-order cycles and sixth order cycles have also been described in much of the Absaroka sequence. The time scale is much smaller and instead of Wilson cycle controlled sea-level change, these shorter cycles were controlled by glaciers (also called glacio-eustasy).

=== First-order cycles ===
This cycle is most likely caused by the break-up and formation of super-continents. The earth went through major climatic swings over the course of 200 to 400 million years. From the late Pre-Cambrian to the late Cambrian, late Devonian to the Triassic-Jurassic border, and since the Miocene until the present time, the earth was an "icehouse", with ice sheets covering the poles. In the intervening years, the earth was a "greenhouse", with high global temperatures and elevated atmospheric CO_{2}. Volcanic activity was also high in the greenhouse years. These long periods of continental emergence helped produce changes in ocean currents and the distribution of atmospheric heat.

=== Second-order cycles ===
There are two competing arguments for second-order sea-level changes. The first states the sea level can be affected by the number of and the volume of the magma being produced at mid-ocean ridges. During times of increased sea floor spreading, more magma is being produced and the volume of the ocean basins are displaced by this. This would result in a higher sea level. This increase in magmatic activity corresponds to increased mantle activity and the Earth's magnetic field.

Another theory is that earth's true polar wander occurs over a long period of time. The tectonic plates of the earth would move relatively faster due to imbalance of continents near the poles. This was true during the Cambrian Period, but the same event also happened approximately 66 million years ago but not as severely.

=== Third-order cycles ===
This order of sea-level change has yet to be fully explained. It was originally thought that glaciers controlled these sea-level changes. But glaciers form and retreat far too rapidly, only tens of thousands of years instead of over a million years. Instead, short-term changes in earth's surface due to volcanics and tectonic events could change global sea levels over a million years. This change to earth's shape could produce "bulges" or "sags" that contribute to ocean level fluctuations.

=== Fourth order cycles ===
Again, there are two competing theories for what controls fourth order cycles. Often called cyclothems, the relative short time period in which individual layers of rock are never more than 1 million years. Glaciers are capable of causing quick changes in sea level that can show up in the rock record. This mechanism has been proposed for many of the Carboniferous-aged coal deposits producing in some regions, such as North America, cycles of seashore advance and retreat of approximately 600 miles along the shallow slopes of the continental margins.

Delta switching has been proposed as an additional mechanism to produce cyclothems. A modern analogue to describe delta switching would be the Mississippi embayment. As the Mississippi River carries its sediment load into the Gulf of Mexico, the delta lobe can become sediment-choked and the river will look for a new channel to follow the path of least resistance. Once the influx of terrestrial sand and silt stops, the area might subside and marine sediments may dominate. Also, whatever terrestrial plants are there can be buried and could eventually become coal. The new river channel will now carry the terrestrial sediments to a new delta, once again starting a new cycle of delta-switching.

== Event stratigraphy ==
This can refer to accumulation of sediments in one specific event. This event could be a large storm, landslide, volcanic eruption, or flood. The thickness of the bed could sometimes be over 50 feet (15 m) in depth. The uniform (or often the erratic) nature of the sediments in relation to the surrounding sediments is the only clue that a particular bed might have been deposited in a single event. A sandstone, for instance, that is well-sorted, contains erratic fossils (like brachiopods) and is wedged between sandstones that are generally poorly-sorted and contain minor siltstone layers and contains no fossils, can be interpreted as tempestite. Other event indicators could be volcanic ash falls, lava flows, lahars, and glacial ice-dam breaks; all of which have been identified in the rock record.

== See also ==
- Milankovitch cycles, a set of forth to seventh-order (0.02-0.4 ma) climate cycles potentially resulting in stratigraphic cycles particularly during glacial climates
