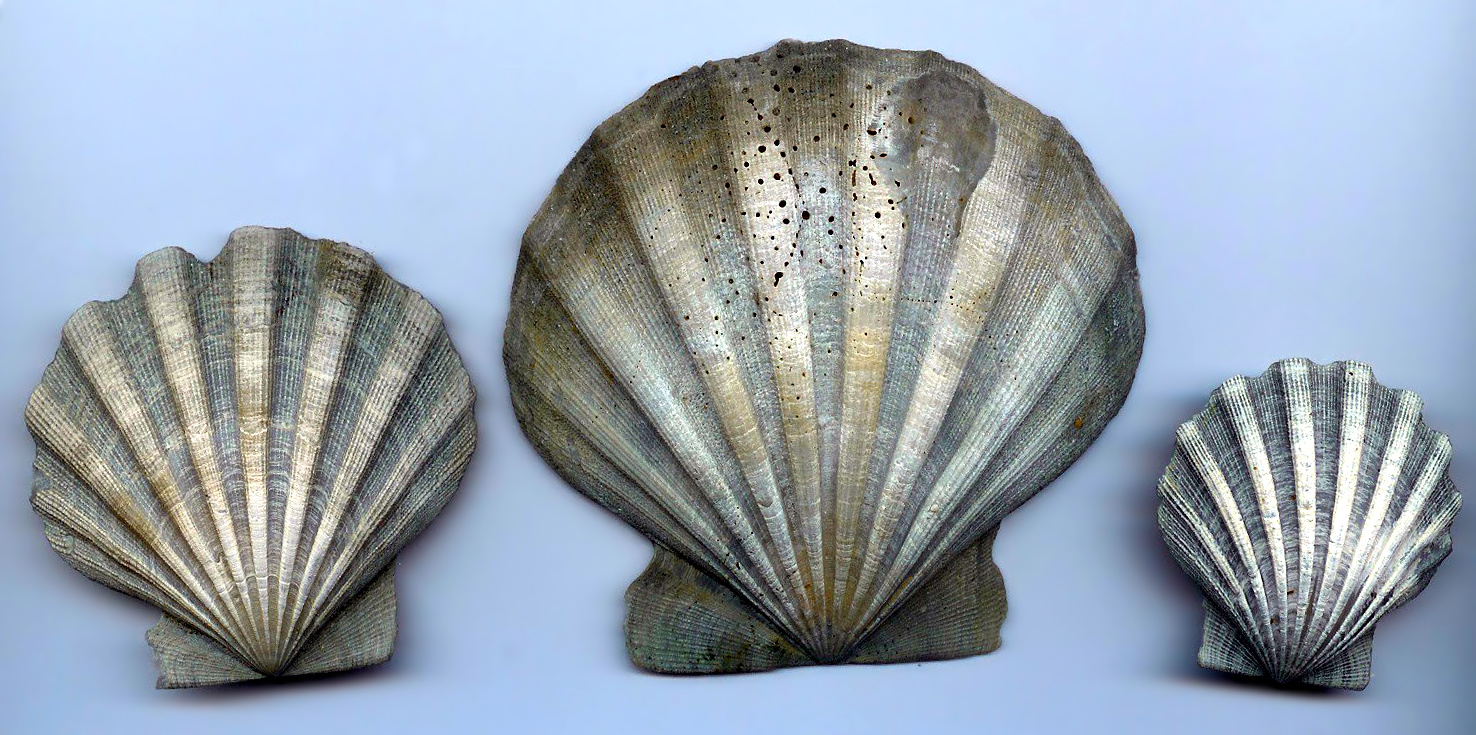
- Chesapecten jeffersonius (outside)
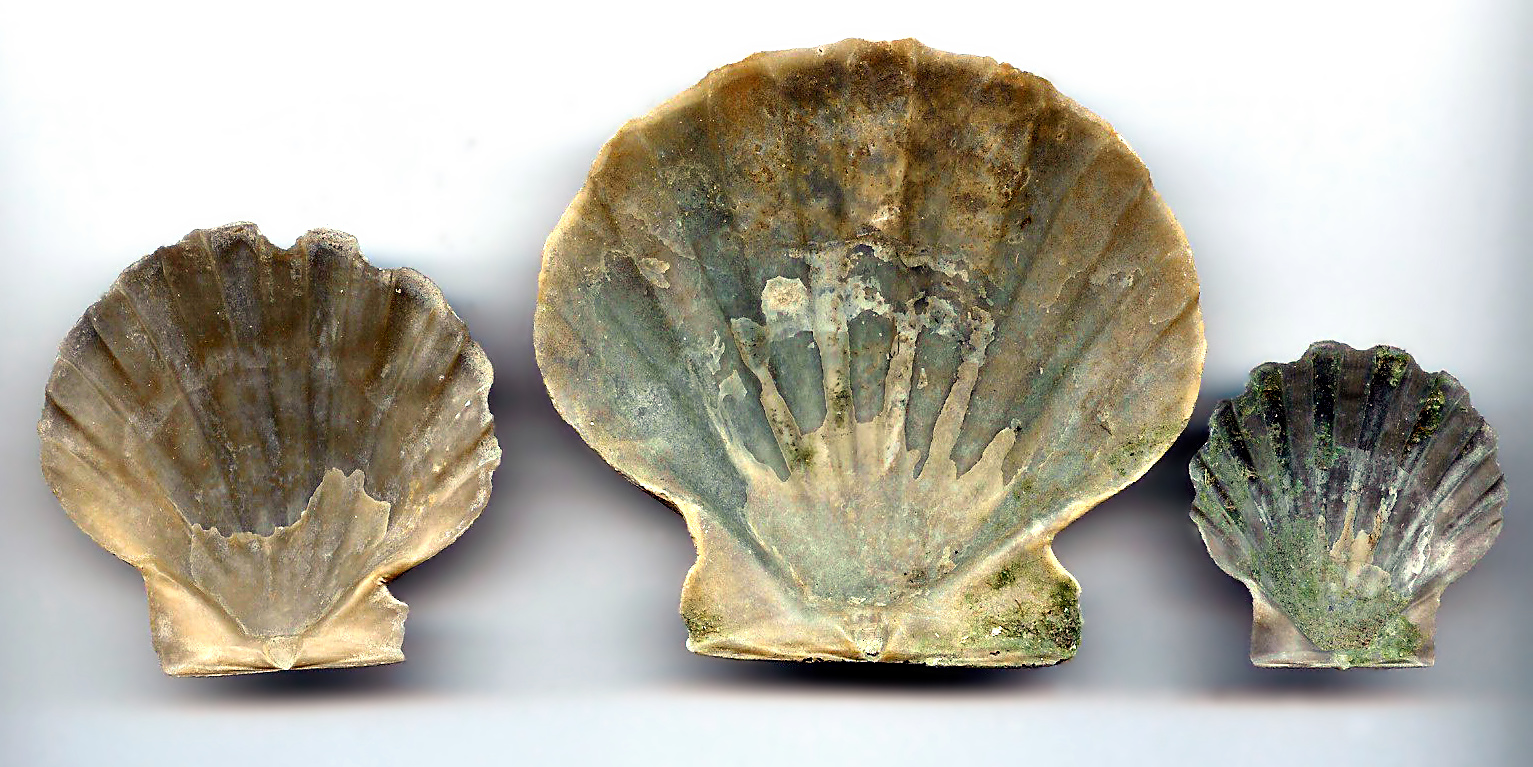
- Chesapecten jeffersonius (inside)

Scientific classification
- Kingdom: Animalia
- Phylum: Mollusca
- Class: Bivalvia
- Order: Pectinida
- Family: Pectinidae
- Genus: †Chesapecten

Type species
- Chesapecten nefrens Ward & Blackwater, 1975

= Chesapecten =

Chesapecten Temporal range: 20.4–0.7 Ma Early Miocene to Early Pleistocene

Extinct genus of bivalves

Chesapecten is an extinct genus of scallop known from marine strata from the early Miocene to the early Pleistocene of the Eastern United States.

It flourished in the shallow seas along the Mid-Atlantic during this period. Other scallops lived at the same time, but Chesapectens were the most abundant.

== Physical description ==
Like some other large scallops, the shells of Chesapecten are characterized by a pattern of wide ribs which radiate outward from the apex of the shell. A distinctive feature of Chesapecten is that the radial ribs on its shell are crossed by much smaller, rough, concentric ribs, which follow the contours of the edges of the shell (are "conmarginal"). The left valve of Chesapecten is more convex than the right valve. The adductor muscle scar is large and rounded.

== Distribution ==
The geographical distribution of Chesapecten is limited to the Atlantic coastal plain of North America, where it can be found as far south as Florida, and as far north as Delaware.

One species of Chesapecten, Chesapecten jeffersonius, is the state fossil of Virginia.

== History of the taxonomy ==
Chesapecten was the first genus of North American fossil to be described and illustrated; a drawing of C. jeffersonius appeared in English naturalist Martin Lister's Historiae Conchyliorum, Liber III in 1687. However, Lister did not give Chesapecten its name. Chesapecten was formally named in 1975 by the paleontologists Ward and Blackwater. In 1980, it was assigned to the family Pectinidae by Harold E. Vokes. The name Chesapecten comes from the Chesapeake Bay, where eroding cliffs and outcrops along the beaches regularly expose specimens.

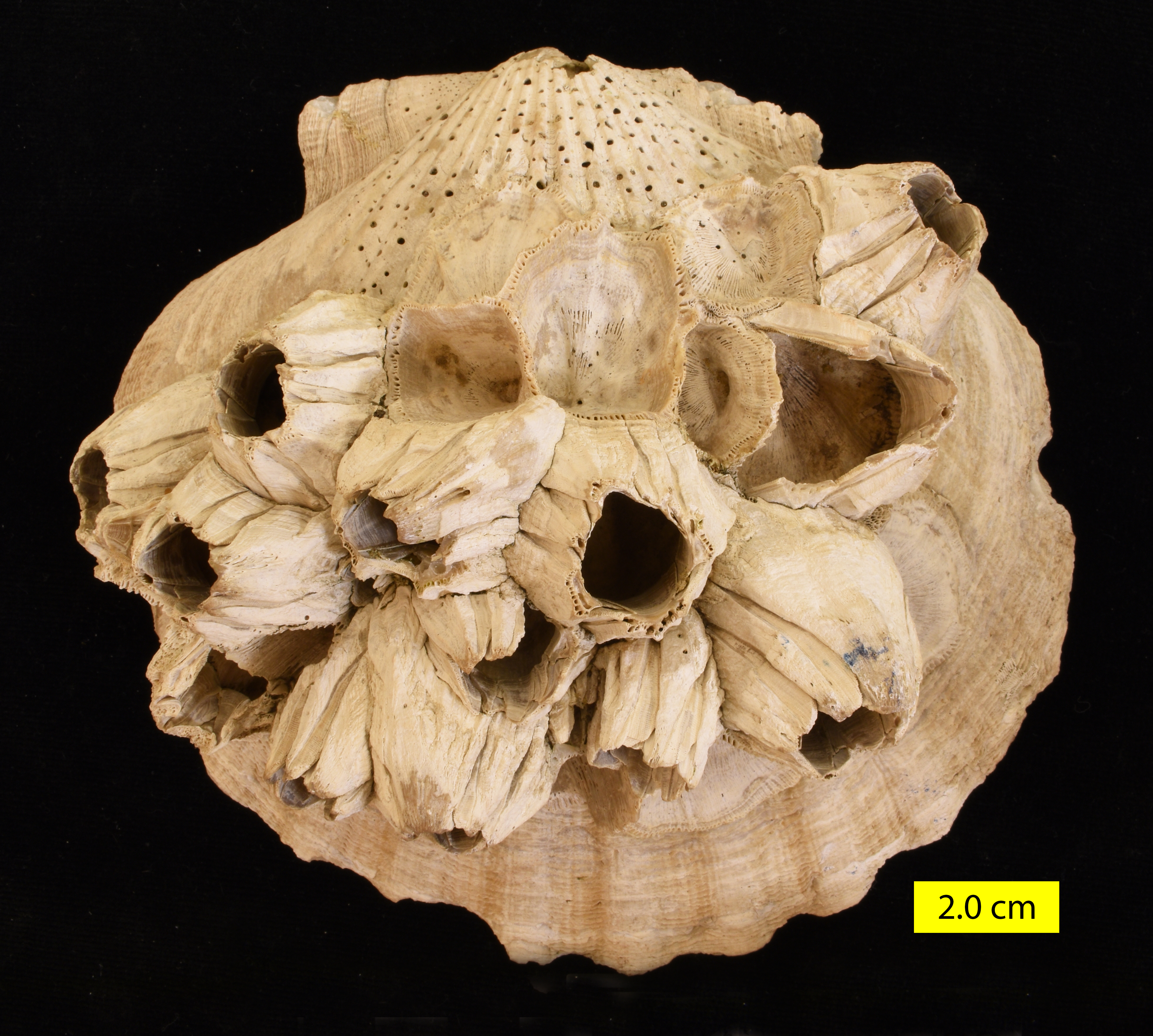
Chesapecten, barnacles and sponge borings (Entobia) from the Pliocene of York River, Virginia.

== Habitat and behavior ==
Chesapecten lived on the seabed in coastal waters ranging in depth from a few feet to 130 feet. When not moving, it is assumed to have rested its flatter right valve on the seafloor. It is very likely that Chesapecten could move suddenly to escape a predator by flapping its valves and using the resulting jet propulsion, in a manner similar to that of almost all living scallops.

== Species ==
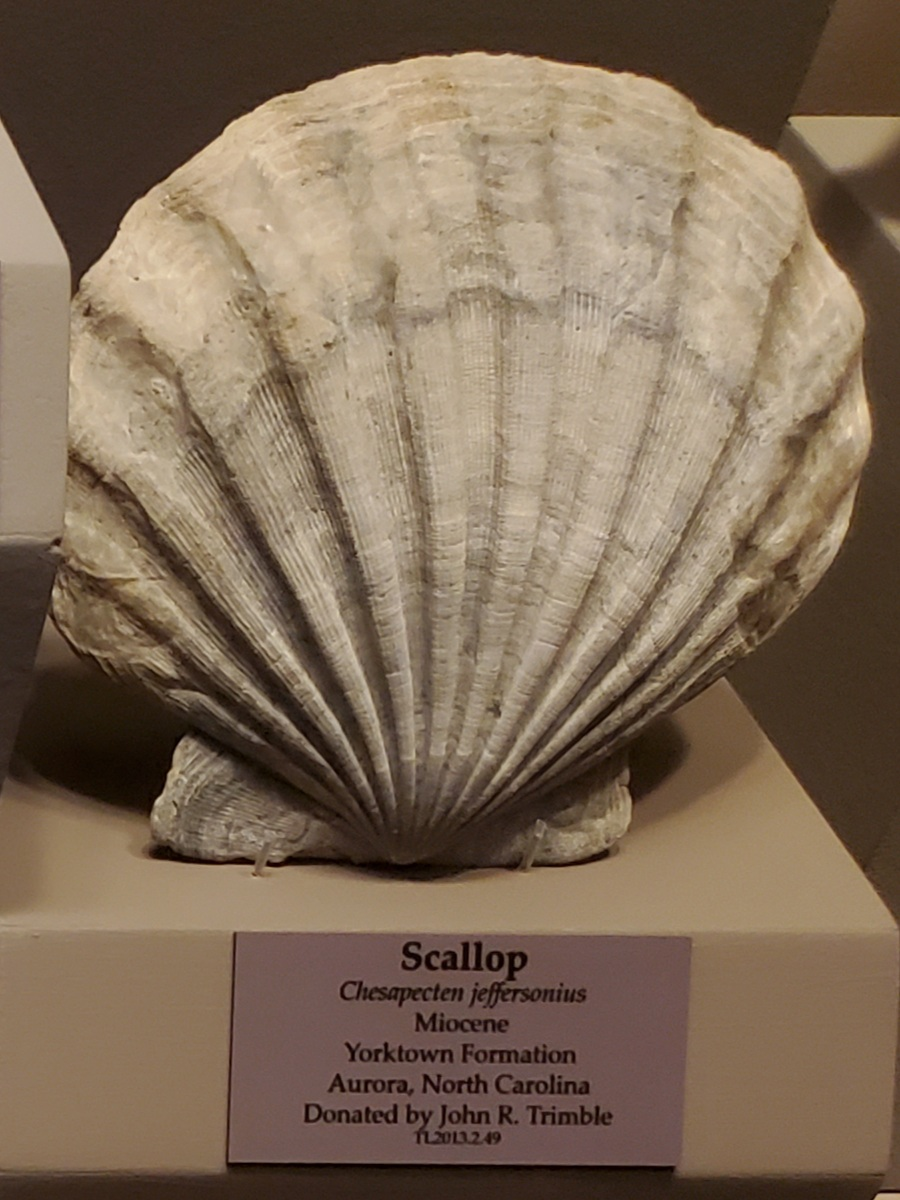
Chesapecten jeffersonius fossil at the Tellus Science Museum

Different species dominated during different intervals of time: middlesexensis during the Miocene (Eastover Formation); Chesapecten jeffersonius during Early Pliocene (Lower Yorktown Formation, about 4.5 to 4.3 million years ago); and madisonius during Late Pliocene time (Upper Yorktown Formation, about 4 to 3 million years ago).

Species in the genus Chesapecten include:

- †C. coccymelus
- †C. jeffersonius
- †C. madisonius
  - †C. m. sarasotensis
- †C. marylandica
- †C. middlesexensis
  - †C. m. bayshorensis
  - †C. m. hunterae
- †C. monicae
- †C. nefrens
- †C. quinarius
- †C. santamaria
- †C. sayanus
- †C. septenarius
- †C. skiptonensis
