= Mauch Chunk Group =

Geologic group in West Virginia

- Stratigraphic range: Carboniferous
- Type: Group

Location
- Region: West Virginia
- Country: United States

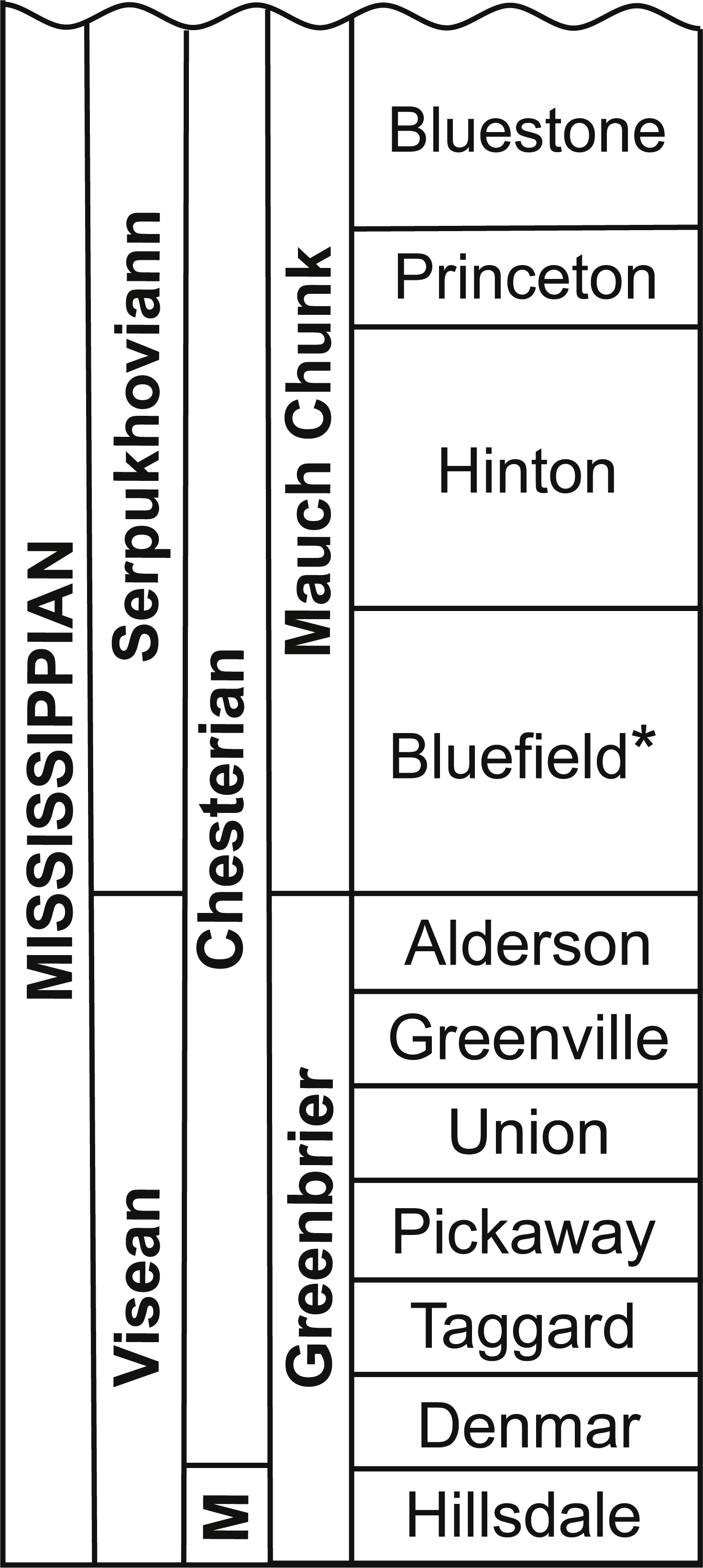
Much Chunk Group - stratigraphy

The Mauch Chunk Group is a geologic group in West Virginia. It preserves fossils dating back to the Carboniferous period.

== See also ==
- List of fossiliferous stratigraphic units in West Virginia
