= McKenzie Formation =

Marylander mapped bedrock unit

- Stratigraphic range: Ludfordian
- Type: Formation
- Underlies: Williamsport Formation
- Overlies: Rochester Shale

Location
- Region: West Virginia
- Country: United States

The Silurian McKenzie Formation is a mapped bedrock unit in Maryland.

== Description ==
The McKenzie Formation is a gray, thin-bedded shale and argillaceous limestone, with interbedded red sandstone and shale in its eastern extents in Maryland. The thickness ranges from 160 to 380 feet. It houses shallow water fauna including but not limited to brachiopods, Ostracods, and tentaculitids.

== Age ==
Relative age dating of the Tuscarora places it in the Silurian period. It rests conformably atop the Clinton Group and conformably below the Bloomsburg Formation.
