= Edinburg Formation =

Geologic formation in Virginia, United States

- Stratigraphic range: Late Ordovician
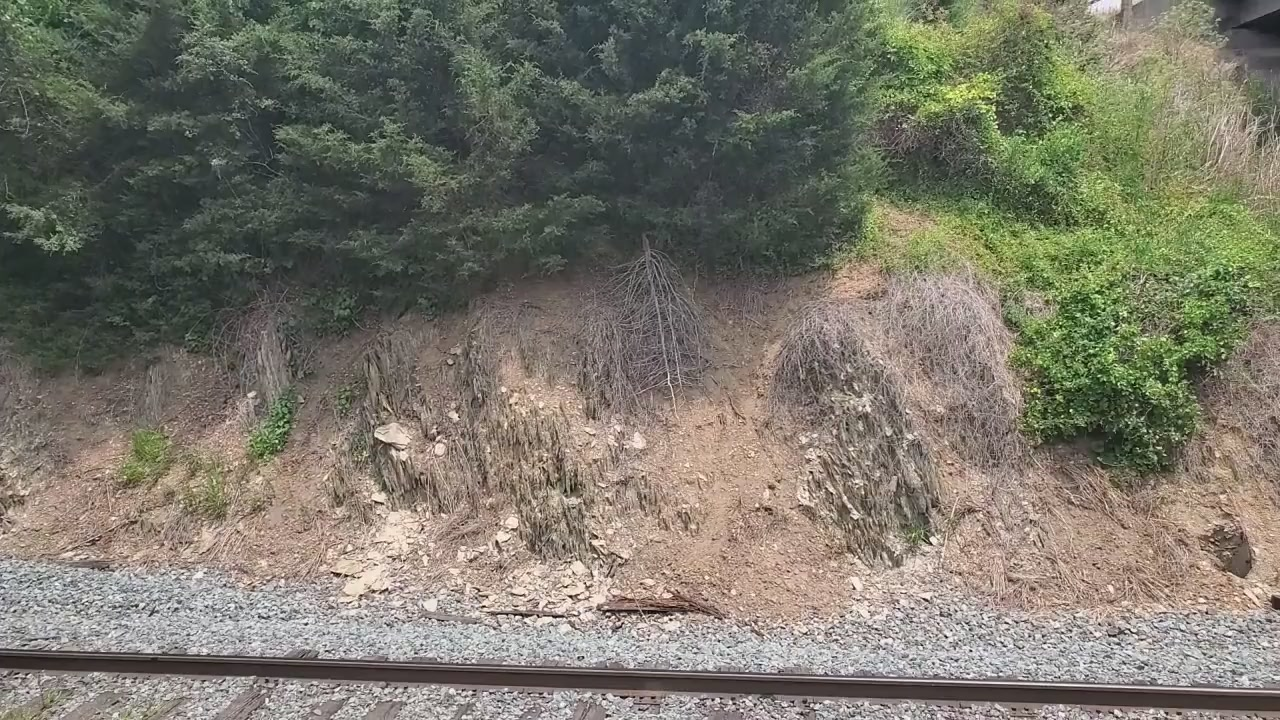
- Outcrop along tracks of the C&O Railway near Staunton
- Type: sedimentary
- Sub-units: Botetourt limestone member, St. Luke limestone member
- Underlies: Martinsburg Formation
- Overlies: Lincolnshire Formation
- Area: Virginia
- Thickness: 1200 feet

Lithology
- Primary: limestone, shale

Location
- Region: Great Appalachian Valley
- Country: United States

Type section
- Named for: Edinburg, Virginia
- Named by: Cooper & Cooper, 1946

The Edinburg Formation is an Ordovician-age geological formation in Virginia. It is primarily composed of basinal (deep sea) limestone and shale, and is one of the younger units in the "Middle Ordovician" sequence of the Shenandoah Valley. However, fossils have shown that it actually was deposited in the early part of the Late Ordovician. There are two major facies encompassed by the Edinburg Formation. The more abundant Liberty Hall facies consist of evenly bedded black limestone and shale. In a few areas, the Liberty Hall facies intertongue with the Lantz Mill facies. The Lantz Mill facies are grainy or cobbly wackestone which weathers to a buff brown color. Fossils are diverse, including graptolites, brachiopods, and trilobites.
