= Lincolnshire Formation =

American geological formation

- Stratigraphic range: Late Ordovician
- Type: Formation
- Underlies: Edinburg Formation
- Overlies: New Market Limestone
- Thickness: 75 to 255 feet

Lithology
- Primary: Limestone
- Other: chert

Location
- Region: Tennessee, Virginia
- Country: United States

Type section
- Named for: Lincolnshire Branch of the Clinch River in Tazewell, Virginia
- Named by: Cooper & Prouty, 1943

The Lincolnshire Formation, often known as the Lincolnshire Limestone, is an Ordovician-age geological formation in the Appalachian region of the Eastern United States.

The Lincolnshire is composed of dark-gray, medium-grained, cherty limestone.
