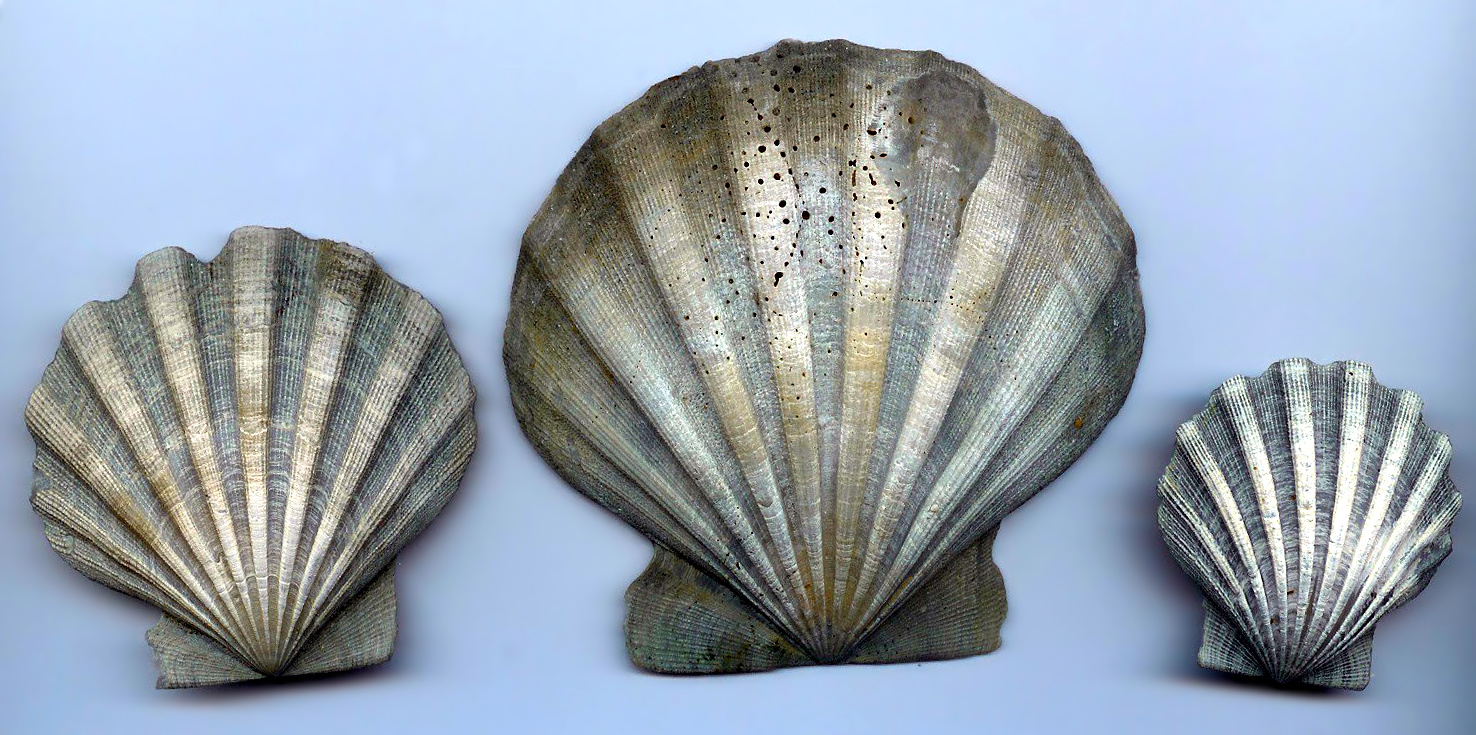
- Chesapecten jeffersonius (exterior of shell)
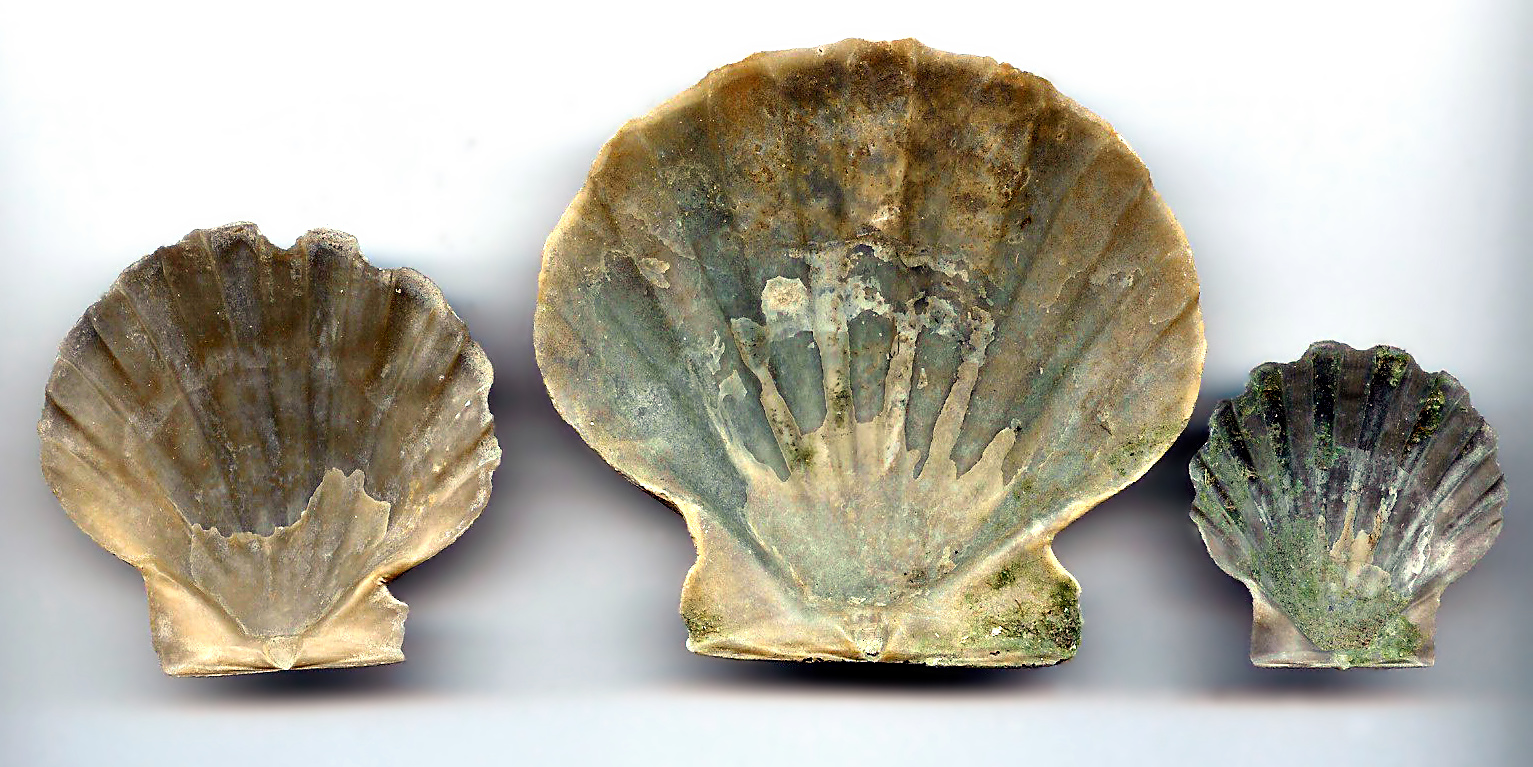
- Chesapecten jeffersonius (interior of shell)

Scientific classification
- Kingdom: Animalia
- Phylum: Mollusca
- Class: Bivalvia
- Order: Pectinida
- Family: Pectinidae
- Genus: †Chesapecten
- Species: †C. jeffersonius

Binomial name
- †Chesapecten jeffersonius (Say, 1824)

= Chesapecten jeffersonius =

Chesapecten jeffersonius Temporal range: 5–4 Ma

Extinct species of bivalve

Chesapecten jeffersonius is the fossilized form of an extinct scallop, which lived in the early Pliocene epoch between four and five million years ago on Virginia's coastal plain. Chesapecten jeffersonius are commonly found in strata exposed along Coastal Plain cliffs along major rivers in southeastern Virginia and eastern North Carolina, and it is the index fossil for the Lower Yorktown Formation.

It is the state fossil of the Commonwealth of Virginia in the United States.

== Paleontological history ==
In 1687, Martin Lister published a drawing of C. jeffersonius, making it the first North American fossil to be illustrated in scientific literature.

In 1824, geologist John Finch gathered a large collection of mollusk fossils, including Chesapecten jeffersonius, from the vicinity of Yorktown, Virginia, and gave them to scientists at the Academy of Natural Sciences of Philadelphia (ANSP).

Scientist Thomas Say, at ANSP, described the species and named it Pecten jeffersonius to honor Thomas Jefferson.

== Identification ==
Chesapecten jeffersonius is distinguished from other Chesapecten species by the number of ribs (9 to 12), and a rather rounded shell edge.
