= Hinton Formation =

Geologic formation in West Virginia, United States

- Stratigraphic range: Serpukhovian
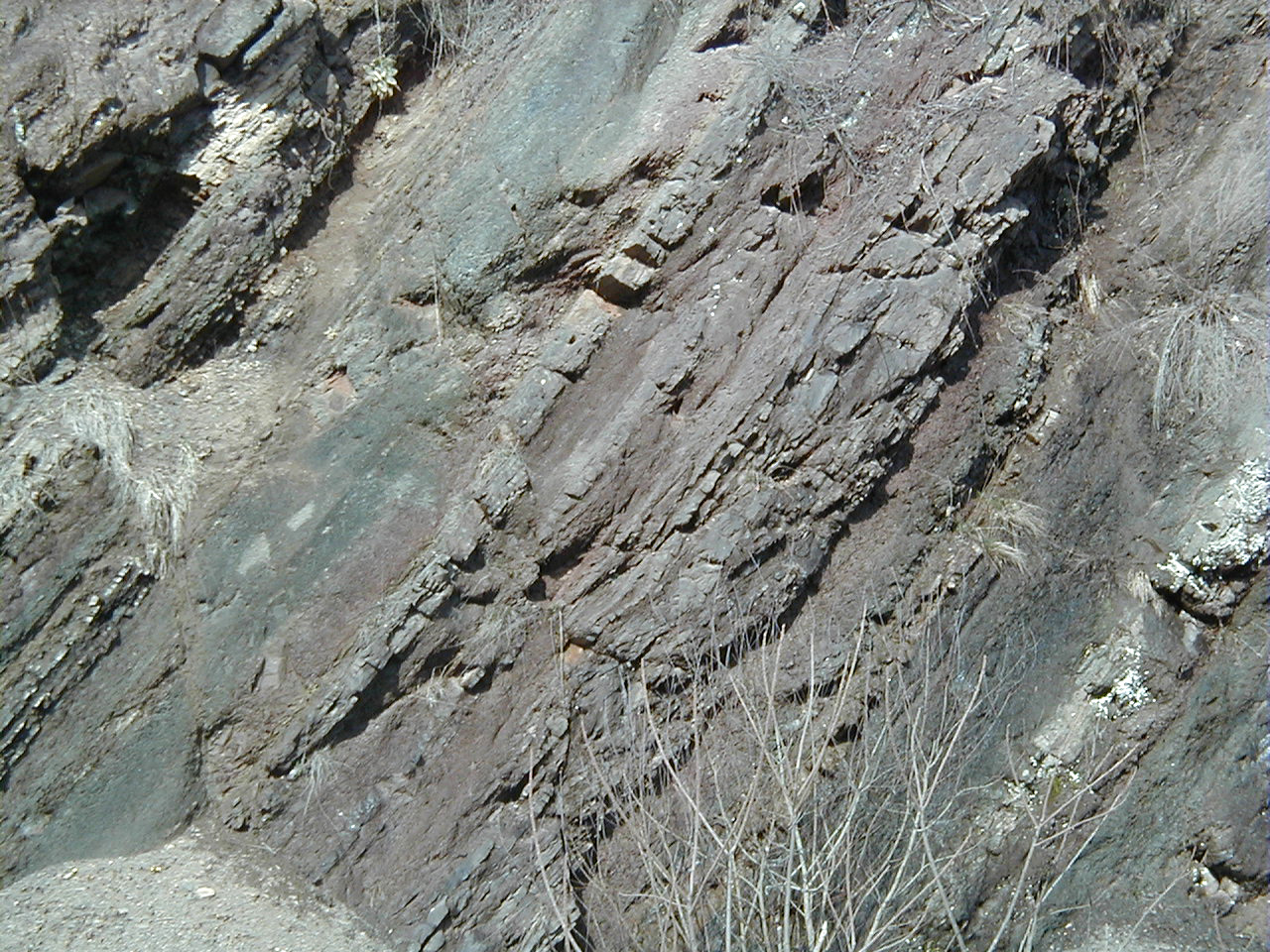
- The Hinton Formation in Upper Mississippian, West Virginia.
- Type: Formation
- Underlies: Princeton Sandstone
- Overlies: Bluefield Formation

Location
- Region: Appalachia and Southeastern United States
- Country: United States
- Extent: Virginia and West Virginia

The Hinton Formation is a geologic formation in West Virginia. It preserves fossils dating back to the Carboniferous period. It is mainly made up of limestone, sandstone, and shale.

== See also ==
- List of fossiliferous stratigraphic units in West Virginia
