= Paleontology in Virginia =

Paleontological research in the U.S. state of Virginia

The location Virginia in the United States

Paleontology in Virginia refers to paleontological research occurring within or conducted by people from the U.S. state of Virginia. The geologic column in Virginia spans from the Cambrian to the Quaternary. During the early part of the Paleozoic, Virginia was covered by a warm shallow sea. This sea would come to be inhabited by creatures like brachiopods, bryozoans, corals, and nautiloids. The state was briefly out of the sea during the Ordovician, but by the Silurian it was once again submerged. During this second period of inundation the state was home to brachiopods, trilobites and entire reef systems. During the mid-to-late Carboniferous the state gradually became a swampy environment.

During the Triassic, the state was covered vegetated by horsetails and trees. Dinosaurs roamed the area, leaving behind both bones and footprints. Many fishes from local lakes were preserved during the Jurassic. Virginia was covered by seawater again during the Cretaceous, when belemnites and corals inhabited the state. Sea levels rose and fell during the Cenozoic. Local marine invertebrates, sharks, and whales were preserved. During the Ice Age, Virginia was home to mastodons. During the late 18th century, Thomas Jefferson directed his scholarly attention to local fossils. Dinosaur tracks were discovered at Oak Hill in the 1920s. The scallop Chesapecten jeffersonius is the Virginia state fossil.

== Prehistory ==
=== Paleozoic ===
No Precambrian fossils are known from Virginia. The geologic column in Virginia begins at the Cambrian and spans to the Quaternary. Although present, the state's Cambrian rocks preserve very few fossils and no documented individual deposit has proven a fertile collecting ground. The state was covered by a warm shallow sea at the time. At least 17 species of nautiloid across 10 genera were preserved in one unit from the transition between the Cambrian and Ordovician in Virginia. Many of these were similar to their contemporaries in neighboring states. Graptolites were preserved in deposits that have since become Virginia's Ordovician shales. Such remains were left behind in Augusta County. Other Ordovician life of Virginia included the brachiopods, bryozoans, corals, echinoderms, and sponges that were preserved in Scott County. The state remained submerged during the early part of the Ordovician until the Taconic uplift raised the region during the later part of that same period.

The state was submerged by the sea once more during the ensuing Silurian period. Silurian brachiopods were preserved in the Gate City area at Big Moccasin Gap.

During the Devonian, the state was the site of mountain building once again. Devonian brachiopods were preserved in Bull Pasture Mountain, Frederick County, and Shenandoah County. Those preserved in Shenandoah County were often unusually large. Corals were preserved at Bull Pasture Mountain. Bryozoans were preserved at Bull Pasture Mountain and Peters Hill. Crinoids were preserved in what is now Frederick County. Ostracods were preserved in what is now Frederick County. Trilobites were preserved in what is now Frederick County. A diverse fossil reef in a Clifton Forge cemetery. Shenandoah county also preserved a wide variety of ancient life in addition to its big brachiopods.

Mississippian algae were preserved in the region south of Gate City. Mississippian brachiopods were preserved in the region south of Gate City and in Washington County. Mississippian corals were preserved in the region south of Gate City Mississippian crinoids were preserved in the region south of Gate City Mississippian gastropods were preserved in the region south of Gate City Mississippian ostracods were preserved in Bland County. Mississippian pelecypods were preserved in Bland and Washington Counties. Virginia was swampy from the Late Mississippian on through the Pennsylvanian. The rich flora of this interval left behind abundant fossils in the sedimentary rocks that were then just being deposited. Plants from this period were fossilized in Montgomery, Alleghany, Wise, Dickenson, and Buchanan counties. The sea then began to withdraw from the state.

=== Mesozoic ===
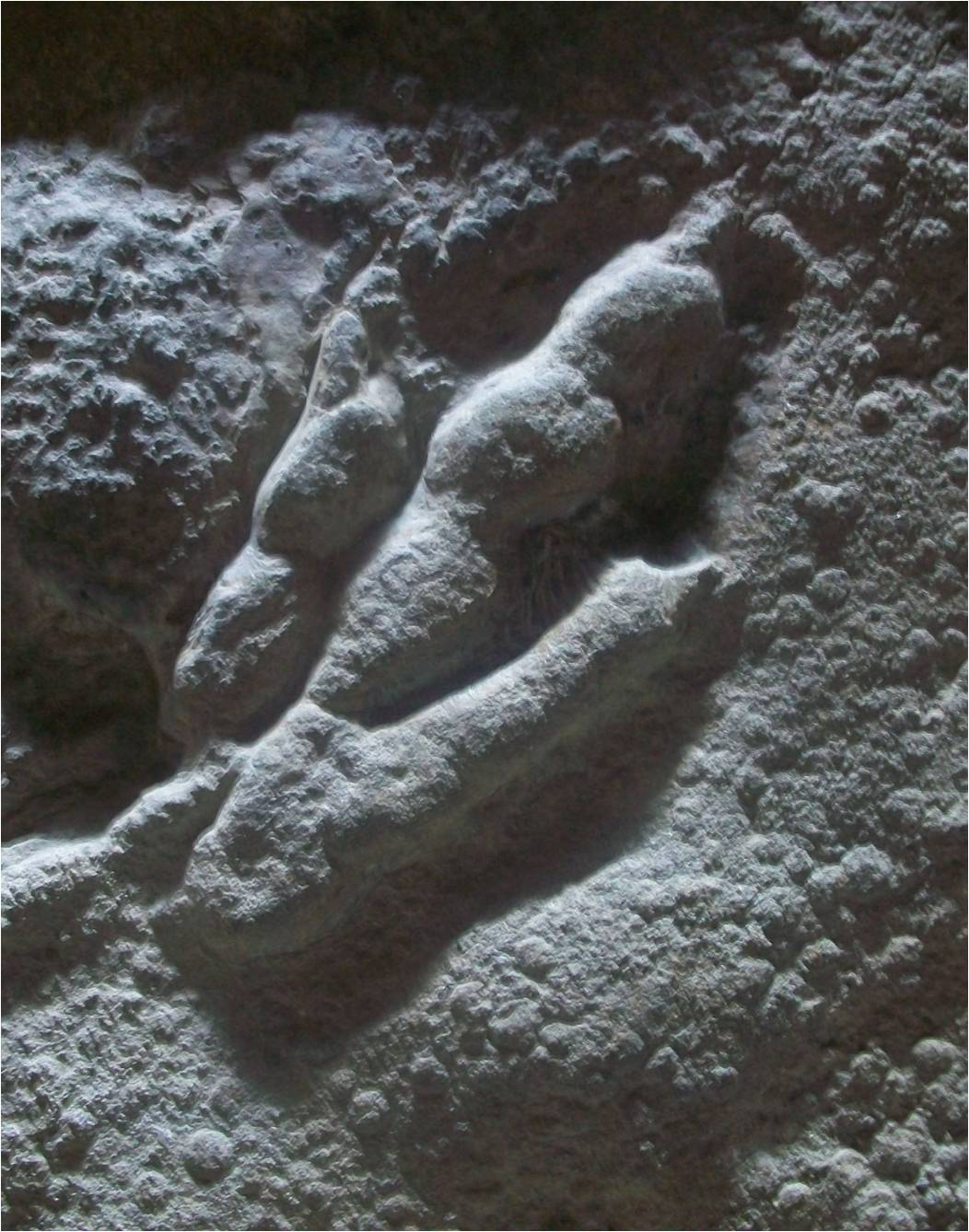
Grallator

During the Triassic, central Virginia was a rift basin. Brachiopods were still present in Virginia during the Mesozoic. On land, the early Mesozoic plants of Virginia included Equisetales, gymnosperms, Cycadeles, cycads, and conifers. This flora is almost identical to that from contemporary deposits in North Carolina. Massive Araucarioxylon were also present.

Dinosaurs lived in Virginia and left behind so many tracks at what is now the Culpeper Stone Quarry of Stevensburg that it has been compared to a ballroom. Another fossil site of similar age, the Solite Quarry, straddles the border between Virginia and North Carolina. A variety of other kinds of animal like crocodilians, phytosaurs, and lizard-like creatures left footprints there.

The Solite Quarry is most famous for its fossil insects. This is the only place on earth where complete well-preserved Triassic insects are known from. The oldest known examples of many living groups have been found here. Insects of the Solite Quarry include staphylinid beetles, caddisflies, belostomatids, and thrips. Fossil insects are common at other places in Virginia as well. Small specimens were often preserved associated with unusually high concentrations of conchostracans.

At Leaksville Junction, near the border with North Carolina, dinosaur footprints have been discovered in the Late Triassic Cow Branch Formation. These may be the oldest dinosaur tracks in the eastern United States. The theropod ichnogenus Grallator and an abundance of the ornithischian ichnogenus Atreipus have been found in this unit. Other finds include remains from the phytosaur Rutiodon and the lizard-like Tanytrachelos.

At least three fossil sites have been discovered for the Late Triassic Manassas Sandstone in Fairfax County, Virginia. Dinosaur tracks of the ichnogenus Grallator have been reported from this unit as have the ichnogenera Apatopus, Brachychirotherium, and Chirotherium, which were left by other kinds of archosaurs. Body fossils are known from fish and the phytosaur Rutiodon.

The Late Triassic dinosaur footprints in the Balls Bluff Sandstone are of such number and quality that the unit is considered one of the best sources of these fossils in the world. Near Culpeper the Balls Bluff Sandstone has produced the ornithischian ichnogenus Gregaripus, the prosauropod ichnogenus Agrestipus, and the theropod ichnogenera Grallator and Kayentapus. Aetosaur tracks have also been found in the Balls Bluff near Culpeper. One Balls Bluff Grallator track was found near Manassas National Battlefield.

For a 30 million year interval spanning the Late Triassic-Early Jurassic boundary, the Culpeper basin was an extensive lake.[41] A diverse fish community swam in what is now Virginia during the Early Jurassic. The best represented among the well-preserved fossils they left behind were semionotids. Other kinds of fish present in Early Jurassic Virginia included coelacanths and palaeoniscids. Their fossils were buried in a deposit now called the Midland Fish Bed. During the Cretaceous period, eastern Virginia was covered by seawater. This sea was home to belemnites and oysters.

=== Cenozoic ===
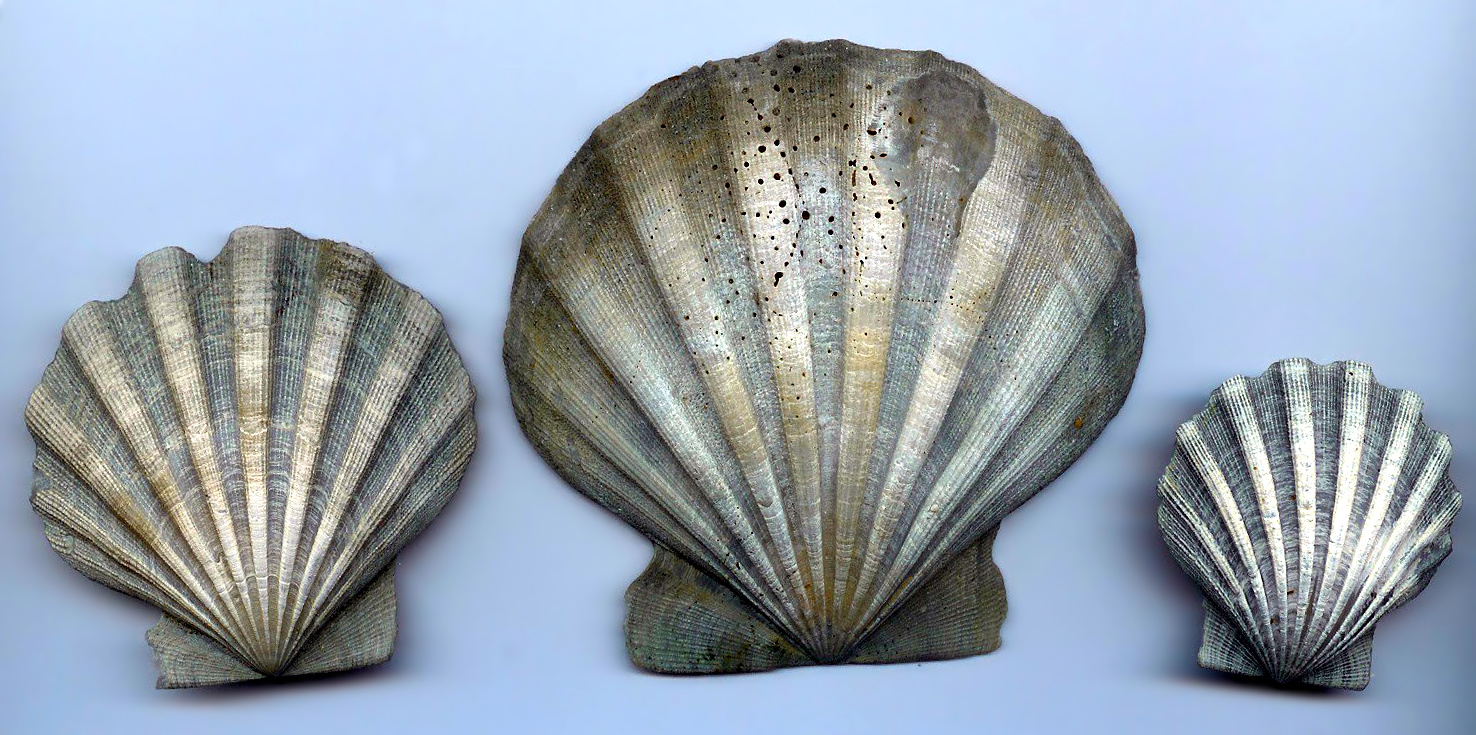
Chesapecten jeffersonius

Local sea level rose and fell significantly during the ensuing Tertiary period of the Cenozoic era. During the Eocene gastropods and pelecypods were preserved in Westmoreland County. Foraminiferans were preserved in James City County. Miocene gastropods were preserved in York and James City Counties. Miocene pelecypods were preserved in York and James City Counties. Miocene vertebrates of Virginia included sharks and whales, which left teeth and bones respectively in York County. During the Quaternary, local mastodons were preserved associated with bodies of water.

== History ==
In 1782, workers digging in a swamp marsh discovered large bones and teeth. Major Arthur Campbell sent them to Thomas Jefferson. He remarked in a letter that several African slaves who had seen the fossils identified them as elephant remains. The slaves' identification of the teeth as elephantine is evidence that this discovery was of mammoth rather than mastodon fossils, whose cusped teeth are very distinct from elephants'. Between 1775 and 1780, Thomas Jefferson conferred with leaders of the Delaware Indians in Virginia about the fossils of Big Bone Lick, of what is now Kentucky.

Sometime around 1920, Early Jurassic dinosaur tracks were discovered during renovations on the grounds of Oak Hill while sandstone was being excavated to line its terraces and walkways. Later, a scientific paper published in 1956 reported the presence of 17 species of nautiloid across 10 genera from a unit at the transition between the Cambrian and Ordovician in Virginia. Of the ten genera observed two were new to science. The researchers also observed that many of these were similar to their contemporaries in neighboring states. During the 1980s the Midland Fish bed was flooded in the course of the construction of a dam. This site preserved abundant remains of Early Jurassic fish like semionotids, palaeoniscids, and coelacanths. Prior to its inundation it had been regarded as one of the best sources of fish fossils in Virginia. In 1993, the scallop Chesapecten jeffersonius was designated the Virginia state fossil.

== Natural history museums ==
- Hostetter Museum of Natural History, Suter Science Center, Eastern Mennonite University, Harrisonburg
- James Madison University Mineral Museum, Harrisonburg
- Museum of the Middle Appalachians, Saltville
- Virginia Museum of Natural History, Martinsville
- Virginia Tech Geosciences Museum, Blacksburg

== See also ==
- Paleontology in Kentucky
- Paleontology in Maryland
- Paleontology in North Carolina
- Paleontology in Tennessee
- Paleontology in West Virginia
