= List of fossiliferous stratigraphic units in New York =

This article contains a list of fossil-bearing stratigraphic units in the state of New York, U.S.

== Sites ==
| Group or Formation | Period | Notes |
|---|---|---|
| Akron Formation | Silurian | |
| Anse Maranda Formation | Cambrian | |
| Bear Creek Shale | Silurian | |
| Becraft Limestone | Devonian | |
| Beekmantown Group/Fort Cassin Formation | Ordovician | |
| Beekmantown Group/Rochdale Formation | Ordovician | |
| Beekmantown Group/Tribes Hill Formation | Ordovician | |
| Beers Hill Formation | Devonian | |
| Bellvale Sandstone | Devonian | |
| Bertie Group | Silurian | |
| Black River Group/Trenton Formation | Ordovician | |
| Black River Group/Amsterdam Limestone | Ordovician | |
| Black River Group/Chaumont Formation | Ordovician | |
| Canadaway Group/Alfred Shale | Devonian | |
| Canadaway Group/Canaseraga Formation | Devonian | |
| Canadaway Group/Cuba Formation | Devonian | |
| Canadaway Group/Dunkirk Formation | Devonian | |
| Canadaway Group/Gowanda Shale | Devonian | |
| Canadaway Group/Java Formation | Devonian | |
| Canadaway Group/Machias Formation | Devonian | |
| Canadaway Group/Rushford Formation | Devonian | |
| Canajoharie Formation | Ordovician | |
| Cashaqua Shale | Devonian | |
| Cayuta Formation | Devonian | |
| Central Valley Sandstone | Devonian | |
| Champlain Clay | | |
| Chaumont Formation | Ordovician | |
| Chazy Formation | Ordovician | |
| Chazyan Group/Valcour Formation | Ordovician | |
| Chazy Group/Crown Point Formation | Ordovician | |
| Chazy Group/Day Point Formation | Ordovician | |
| Chazy Group/Valcour Formation | Ordovician | |
| Chemung Group | Devonian | |
| Chesney Formation | Devonian | |
| Chrysler Formation | Silurian | |
| Clinton Group/Bear Creek Formation | Silurian | |
| Clinton Group/Furnaceville Formation | Silurian | |
| Clinton Group/Gasport Limestone | Silurian | |
| Clinton Group/Glenmark Shale | Silurian | |
| Clinton Group/Herkimer Formation | Silurian | |
| Clinton Group/Irondequoit Limestone | Silurian | |
| Clinton Group/Kirkland Formation | Silurian | |
| Clinton Group/Kirkwood Formation | Silurian | |
| Clinton Group/Maplewood Formation | Silurian | |
| Clinton Group/Neahga Formation | Silurian | |
| Clinton Group/Oneida Formation | Silurian | |
| Clinton Group/Reynales Formation | Silurian | |
| Clinton Group/Rochester Shale | Silurian | |
| Clinton Group/Rockway Formation | Silurian | |
| Clinton Group/Sauquoit Formation | Silurian | |
| Clinton Group/Sodus Formation | Silurian | |
| Clinton Group/Westmoreland Formation | Silurian | |
| Clinton Group/Williamson Shale | Silurian | |
| Clinton Group/Willowvale Formation | Silurian | |
| Clinton Group/Wolcott Limestone | Silurian | |
| Coeymans Limestone | Devonian | |
| Conewango Group/Cattaraugus Formation | Devonian | |
| Conneaut Group/Ellicott Formation | Devonian | |
| Conneaut Group/Oswayo Formation | Devonian | |
| Connelly Conglomerate | Devonian | |
| Cotter Formation | Ordovician | |
| Day Point Formation | Ordovician | |
| Decker Formation | Silurian | |
| Deepkill Shale | Ordovician | |
| Denley Limestone | Ordovician | |
| Dodgeville Facies | Ordovician | |
| Enfield Formation | Devonian | |
| Eramosa Formation | Silurian | |
| Esopus Formation | Devonian | |
| Fort Ann Formation | Ordovician | |
| Fort Cassin Formation | Ordovician | |
| Gardeau Formation | Devonian | |
| Gardiners Clay | | |
| Gasport Limestone | Silurian | |
| Genesee Group/Geneseo Shale | Devonian | |
| Genesee Group/Genundewa Limestone | Devonian | |
| Genesee Group/Ithaca Formation | Devonian | |
| Genesee Group/Lodi Formation | Devonian | |
| Genesee Group/Ludlowville Formation | Devonian | |
| Genesee Group/Oneonta Formation | Devonian | |
| Genesee Group/Onteora Formation | Devonian | |
| Genesee Group/Penn Yan Formation | Devonian | |
| Genesee Group/Rock Stream Formation | Devonian | |
| Genesee Group/Sherburne Sandstone | Devonian | |
| Genesee Group/Sonyea Group | Devonian | |
| Genesee Group/Tully Limestone | Devonian | |
| Genesee Group/West River Shale | Devonian | |
| Genesee Group/Genundewa Limestone | Devonian | |
| Glen Aubrey Formation | Devonian | |
| Gowanda Shale | Devonian | |
| Great Meadows Formation | Ordovician | |
| Guelph Formation | Silurian | |
| Hamilton Group/Ashokan Formation | Devonian | |
| Hamilton Group/Bellvale Sandstone | Devonian | |
| Hamilton Group/Below Genesee Formation | Devonian | |
| Hamilton Group/Centerfield Limestone | Devonian | |
| Hamilton Group/Cherry Valley Formation | Devonian | |
| Hamilton Group/Delphi Formation | Devonian | |
| Hamilton Group/Gilboa Formation | Devonian | |
| Hamilton Group/Hamilton Formation | Devonian | |
| Hamilton Group/Jaycox Formation | Devonian | |
| Hamilton Group/Kiskatom Formation | Devonian | |
| Hamilton Group/Ludlowville Formation | Devonian | |
| Hamilton Group/Marcellus Formation | Devonian | |
| Hamilton Group/Moscow Formation | Devonian | |
| Hamilton Group/Mount Marion Formation | Devonian | |
| Hamilton Group/Panther Mountain Formation | Devonian | |
| Hamilton Group/Platekill Formation | Devonian | |
| Hamilton Group/Skaneateles Formation | Devonian | |
| Hamilton Group/Tully Formation | Devonian | |
| Hamilton Group/Tully Pyrite | Devonian | |
| Hamilton Group/Union Springs Formation | Devonian | |
| Hamilton Group/Moscow Formation | Devonian | |
| Helderberg Group | Devonian | |
| Helderberg Group/Coeymans Formation | Devonian | |
| Helderberg Group/Kalkberg Formation | Devonian | |
| Helderberg Group/Manlius Formation | Devonian | |
| Helderberg Group/New Scotland Formation | Devonian | |
| Hoyt Limestone | Cambrian | |
| Irondequoit Limestone | Silurian | |
| Ithaca Sandstone | Devonian | |
| Jacobs Sand | | |
| Java Formation | Devonian | |
| Joslin Hill Formation | Silurian | |
| Kalkberg Limestone | Devonian | |
| Kanouse Formation | Devonian | |
| Katsberg Formation | Devonian | |
| Kings Falls Limestone | Ordovician | |
| Little Falls Formation | Cambrian | |
| Lockport Group/Gasport Limestone | Silurian | |
| Lockport Group/Ilion Formation | Silurian | |
| Lorraine Group/Pulaski Shale Group/Whetstone Gulf | Ordovician | |
| Katsberg Formation | Devonian | |
| Trenton Group/Denley Limestone | Ordovician | |
| Trenton Group/Sugar River Limestone | Ordovician | |
| Ludlowville Formation | Devonian | |
| Manlius Limestone | Devonian | |
| Marcellus Formation | Devonian | |
| Meads Creek Formation equivalent | Devonian | |
| Medina Group/Grimsby Formation | Silurian | |
| Medina Group/Power Glen Formation | Silurian | |
| Medina Group/Thorold Formation | Silurian | |
| Millport Formation equivalent | Devonian | |
| Napanee Limestone | Ordovician | |
| Naples Group/Oneonta Formation | Devonian | |
| New Scotland Formation | Devonian | |
| Normanskill Formation | Ordovician | |
| Oak Orchard Formation | Silurian | |
| Ogdensburg Formation | Ordovician | |
| Oneonta Formation | Devonian | |
| Onondaga Limestone | Devonian | |
| Onteora Formation | Devonian | |
| Oriskany Formation | Devonian | |
| Panther Mountain Formation | Devonian | |
| Pine Hill Formation | Devonian | |
| Portage Group/Middlesex Shale | Devonian | |
| Potsdam Sandstone | Cambrian | |
| Rhinestreet Formation | Devonian | |
| Rochester Shale | Silurian | |
| Rockway Formation | Silurian | |
| Salem Limestone | Carboniferous | |
| Salina Group/Cobleskill Formation | Silurian | |
| Salina Group/Syracuse Formation | Silurian | |
| Salina Group/Vernon Formation | Silurian | |
| Sauquoit Formation | Silurian | |
| Schaghticoke Formation | Ordovician | |
| Schodack Formation | Cambrian | |
| Selby Limestone | Ordovician | |
| Shawangunk Formation | Silurian | |
| Sherburne Formation | Devonian | |
| Skaneateles Formation | Devonian | |
| Sodus Shale | Silurian | |
| Sonyea Group/Cashaqua Formation | Devonian | |
| Sonyea Group/Delaware River Flags | Devonian | |
| Sonyea Group/Enfield Formation | Devonian | |
| Sonyea Group/Glen Aubrey | Devonian | |
| Sonyea Group/Katsberg Formation | Devonian | |
| Sonyea Group/Katzberg | Devonian | |
| Sonyea Group/Middlesex Shale | Devonian | |
| Sonyea Group/Rock Stream Formation | Devonian | |
| Sonyea Group/Stony Clove Sandstone | Devonian | |
| Sonyea Group/Triangle Formation | Devonian | |
| Sonyea Group/Walton Formation | Devonian | |
| Stockton Formation | Triassic | |
| Stony Clove Sandstone | Devonian | |
| Sugar River Limestone | Ordovician | |
| Syracuse Formation | Silurian | |
| Trenton Group/Cobourg Limestone | Ordovician | |
| Trenton Group/Denley Limestone | Ordovician | |
| Trenton Group/Dolgeville Formation | Ordovician | |
| Trenton Group/Sherman Fall Limestone | Ordovician | |
| Tristates Group/Esopus Formation | Devonian | |
| Tristates Group/Oriskany Formation | Devonian | |
| Tristates Group/Schoharie Grit | Devonian | |
| Tully Limestone | Devonian | |
| Tully Group | Devonian | |
| Utica Shale | Ordovician | |
| Vernon Shale | Silurian | |
| Volusia Shale | Devonian | |
| West Castleton Formation | Cambrian | |
| West Falls Group/Beers Hill Formation | Devonian | |
| West Falls Group/Honesdale Formation | Devonian | |
| West Falls Group/Angola Formation | Devonian | |
| West Falls Group/Beers Hill Formation | Devonian | |
| West Falls Group/Chemung Formation | Devonian | |
| West Falls Group/Hanover Formation | Devonian | |
| West Falls Group/Hatch Shale | Devonian | |
| West Falls Group/Java Formation | Devonian | |
| West Falls Group/Rhinestreet Shale | Devonian | |
| West Falls Group/Walton Formation | Devonian | |
| Whitehall Formation | Ordovician, Cambrian | |
| Williamson Shale | Silurian | |
| Willowvale Shale | Silurian | |
| Wiscoy Sandstone | Devonian | |
| Wolcott Limestone | Silurian | |

== See also ==
- Paleontology in New York
