= Tristates Group =

- Stratigraphic range: Devonian
- Type: Group
- Sub-units: Bois Blanc Formation / Schoharie Formation Esopus Formation Oriskany Formation / Glenerie Formation

Location
- Region: New York
- Country: United States

The Tristates Group is a geologic group in New York. It preserves fossils dating back to the Devonian period.

== See also ==
- List of fossiliferous stratigraphic units in New York
