= Cuba Formation =

Cuba formation may refer to one or more of the following:

- Cuba Sandstone (New York)
- Cuba Formation (Sandstone) a member of the Carbondale Group
