= Cuba Sandstone (New York) =

Geologic formation in New York, US

- Stratigraphic range: Famennian
- Type: Formation
- Unit of: Conneaut Group
- Underlies: Girard shale
- Overlies: Northeast shale
- Thickness: 10 to 40 feet thick

Lithology
- Primary: Sandstone
- Other: Shale

Location
- Region: New York, Pennsylvania
- Country: United States

Type section
- Named for: Cuba, New York
- Named by: John M. Clarke, 1902

The Cuba Sandstone is a member of Canadaway Group found in central New York (State). The Cuba is a lenticular (geology) regional formation. It is believed be a small delta formed in the Devonian. This unit is approximately 10 to 40 feet thick.

== Description ==
The Cuba is described as a slightly arkosic, cream colored sandstone. Grain sizes tend to be medium to course. It has been noted to smell strongly of petroleum. The Cuba is formed by three fine grained lensing packets. The lenses are separated by units of interbedded grey shales and thin sandstone beds. The Cuba formation was formed by episodic storm events, up to hurricane strength.

== Economic and Historical Significance ==
The Cuba Oil Spring also known as the Seneca Oil Spring is located approximately a mile and a half from the town of Cuba, New York. This was an active oil seep known to Native Americans of the Seneca tribe. In 1627, this seep was the location of the first time European people observed petroleum in North America. Historically it was recorded that a Franciscan Recollect Friar, Father Joseph de la Roche Daillon, was taken to the location by a group of Native Americans. There is some dispute to this early date. Another account occurred in 1656 by Jesuit Fr. Paul LeJeune who described it, "As one approaches nearer to the country of the Cats (Eries) one finds heavy and thick water, which ignites like brandy, and boils up in bubbles of flame when fire is applied to it."

== Fossils ==
- Spirifer disjunctus
- S. mesacostalis
- Athyris angelica
- Camarotoechia contracta
- Orthis (Schizophoria) impressa
- Orthothetes chemungensis C
- Productella lachrymosa
- Schizodus rhombeus
- Grammysia communis
