= Irondequoit Formation =

Silurian aged formation

- Stratigraphic range: Sheinwoodian; ~432.9–430.6 Ma
- Type: Formation
- Unit of: Clinton Group
- Underlies: Rochester Formation
- Overlies: Sodus Formation, Reynales Formation, Rockway Dolomite
- Thickness: Up to 23'

Lithology
- Primary: Limestone
- Other: Dolomite, Shale

Location
- Country: United States, Canada
- Extent: New York, Pennsylvania, Ontario

Type section
- Named for: Irondequoit, New York
- Named by: Hartnagel (1907)

The Irondequoit Formation is a geologic formation in the Eastern United States and Canada.

== Description ==
The Irondequoit is a mapped unit of Limestone with outcrops in western New York, and Ontario. It is a member of the Clinton Group. Subsurface it extends into northern Pennsylvania. The Irondequoit is described as a light gray-pinkish gray limestone-greenish gray carbonate. It tends to have abundant crinoids and brachiopods with some rugosa corals bound into a grainstone or packstone in the west. The beds are thick to massive. Toward the top of the formation as it nears the Rochester Formation thin greenish gray bed of shale maybe present. Reef knolls have been observed in the upper sections of the formation ranging from three to ten feet wide and up to six and a half feet tall. In the east it grades to packstones to wackestones.

== Stratigraphy ==
The Irondequoit is overlain by the Rochester Formation. This contact is conformable in New York but in Ontario it is unconformable erosional contact. The lower contact in New York is the Rockway Dolomite marked by an unconformable contact.

== Fossils ==
=== Conodont ===
- Kockelella ranuliformis

=== Brachiopoda ===
- Whitfieldella
- Atrypa

=== Ostracods ===
- Mastigobolbina typus

==== Rugose Coral ====
- Enterolasma
