= Onteora =

Onteora may refer to:

- Onteora Mountain
- Onteora Formation
- The Onteora Scout Reservation run by the Theodore Roosevelt Council, located in Livingston Manor, New York
- The Onteora Central School District, covering the northern portion of Ulster County, New York
- The Onteora Park Historic District, located in Greene County, New York
