= Eternal Flame Falls =

Waterfall in western New York, US

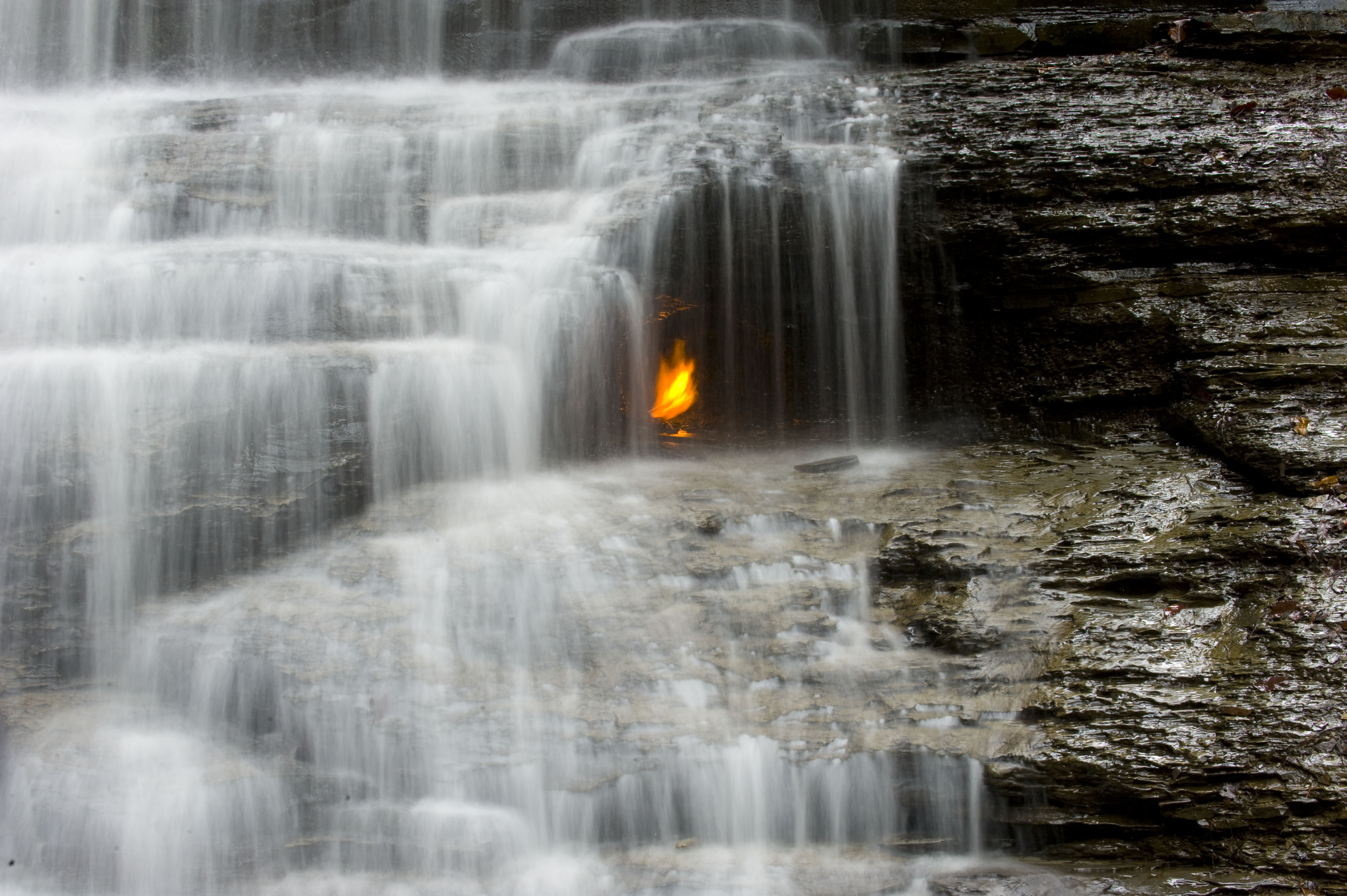
- The natural gas-fueled "eternal flame" below the falls in early 2009

- Location within New York Location within the United States
- Location: Chestnut Ridge Park; Erie County, New York
- Coordinates: 42°42′06.5″N 78°45′06.1″W
- Type: Cascade
- Total height: 30 feet (9.1 m)
- Watercourse: Shale Creek, tributary to Eighteen Mile Creek

The Eternal Flame Falls is a small waterfall located in the Shale Creek Preserve, a section of Chestnut Ridge Park in Western New York. A small grotto at the waterfall's base emits natural gas, which can be lit to produce a small flame. This flame is visible nearly year round, although it can be extinguished and must occasionally be re-lit.

== 2020s developments ==
Once considered an "obscure" attraction in the region, media attention and improvements to the access trail have led to an increased number of visitors. The increased popularity of the falls has led to some negative impacts, such as an increase in litter, vandalism, pollution, and impacts on the surrounding terrain by tourists. In August 2023, the main trail to the Eternal Flame Falls in Orchard Park, New York re-opened after major work, including the addition of 139 box steps bypassing the trickiest part of the Eternal Flame Trail at Chestnut Ridge Park, and some 120 feet (35 m) of railing along the trail to the creek bed. This remains a challenging descent into the stream; extreme caution and proper footwear are suggested.

== Composition and source of gas ==
Geologists from Indiana University Bloomington and Italy's National Institute of Geophysics and Volcanology studied Eternal Flame Falls in 2013 in an effort to better understand how natural gas emitted from naturally occurring hydrocarbon seeps contribute to greenhouse gases in the atmosphere. They found that the 'macro seep' at Eternal Flame Falls had higher concentrations of ethane and propane (about 35%) than other known natural gas seeps, which typically contain a greater proportion of methane. They estimated that the seep at the falls emits approximately one kilogram (2.2 lb) of methane per day.

The researchers also noted the presence of numerous other 'micro seeps' in the area of the falls. By comparing the gas emitted by these seeps with gas from wells in the area, they determined that the gasses originate from Rhinestreet Shale approximately 400 meters (1,300 ft) below the surface. Tectonic activity likely opened faults in the shale, allowing the gas to reach the surface.

According to one geologist involved in the 2013 study, the seep's apparent source could provide evidence for a previously unknown geologic mechanism by which natural gas is produced within shale. Typically, shale must be hot (around 100 °C [212 °F]) for its carbon structures to break down and form smaller natural gas molecules. However, the shale from which Eternal Flame Falls draws its gas is much cooler, in addition to being younger and shallower than typical gas-bearing shale. This may indicate that additional, as yet un-demonstrated, processes can contribute to the creation of natural gas in shale; one possibility is that a catalyst capable of breaking down shale in cooler conditions is present.

== Gallery ==
Eternal Flame Falls, Chestnut Ridge Park, NY

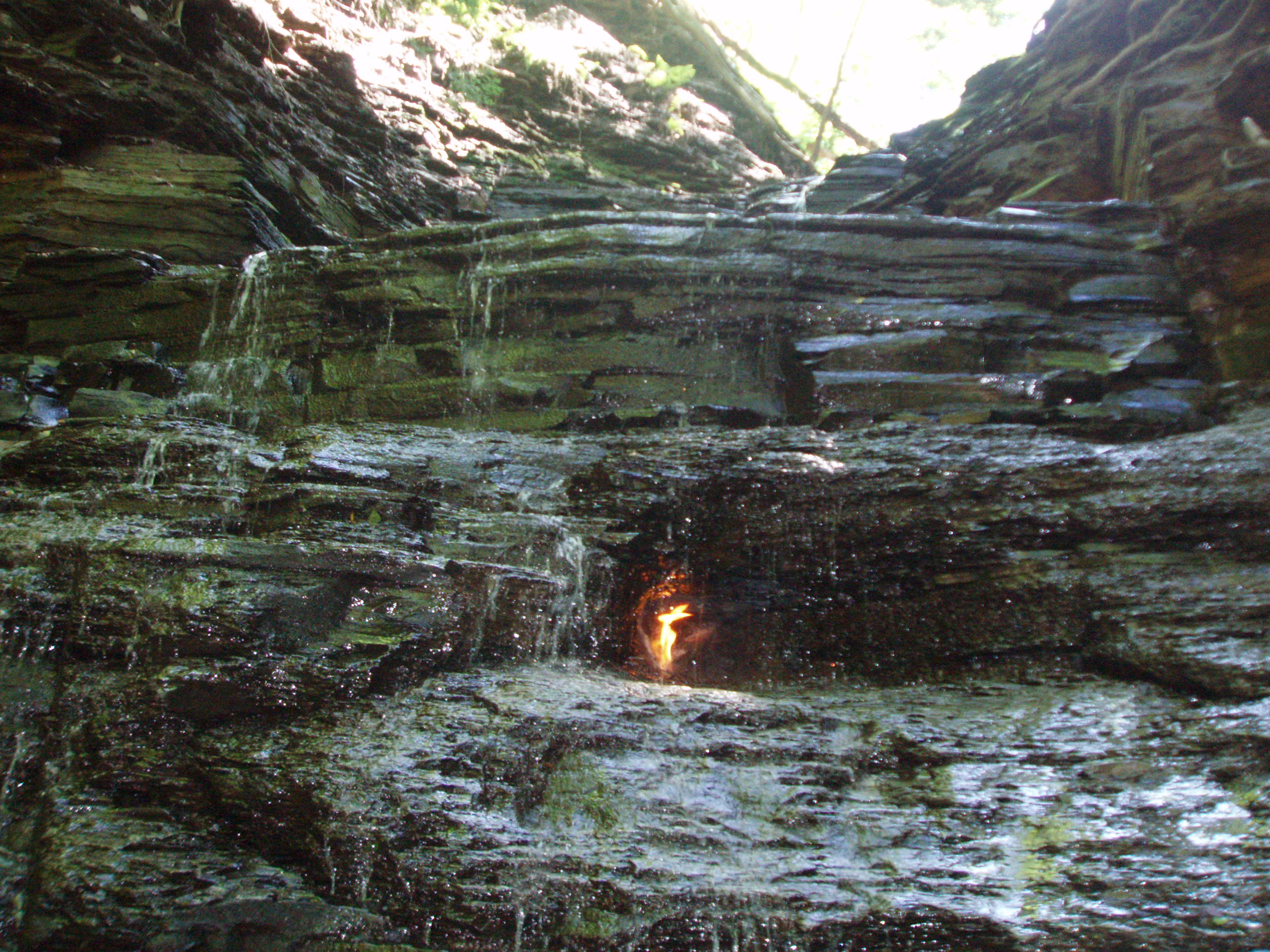

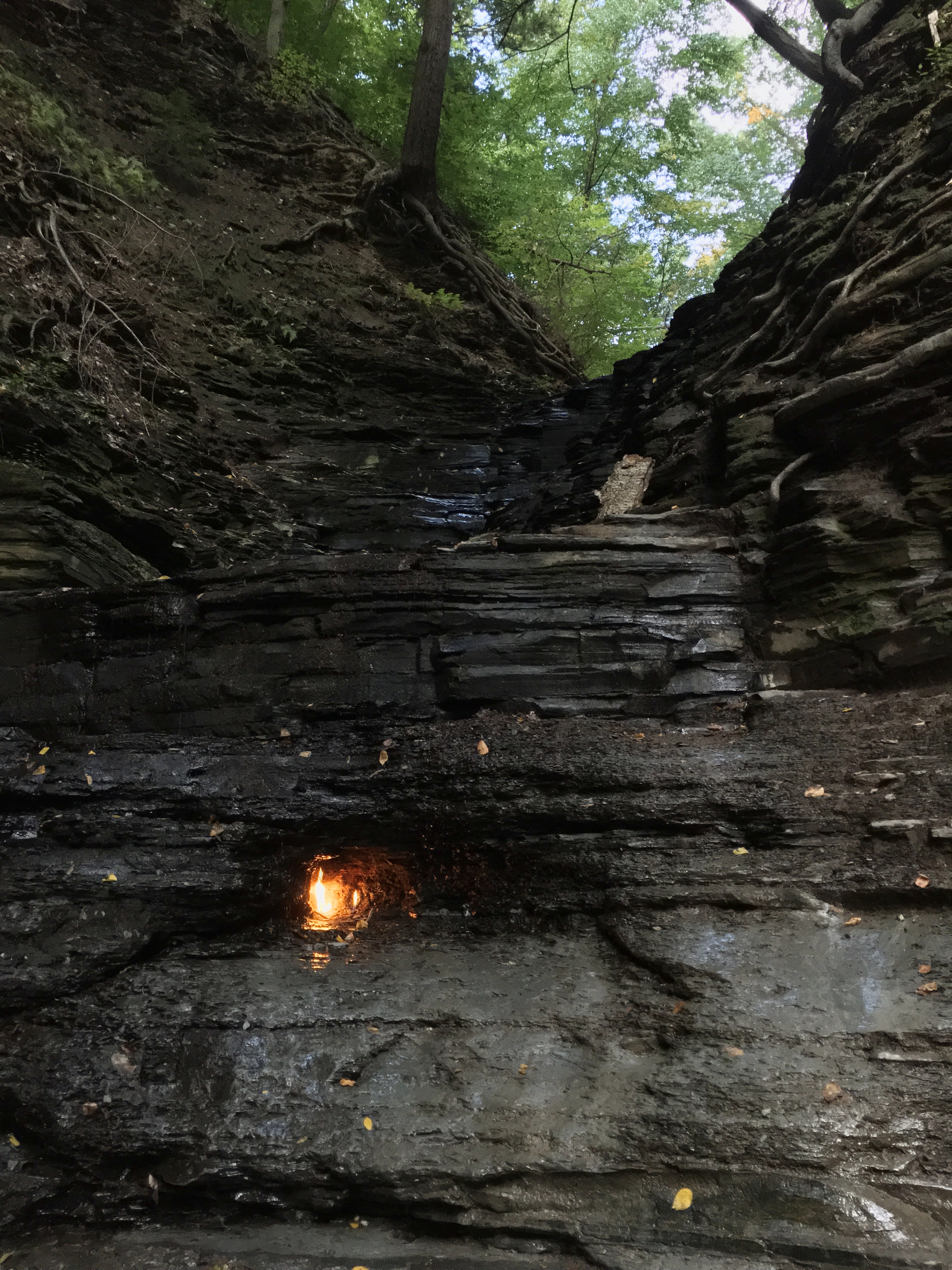

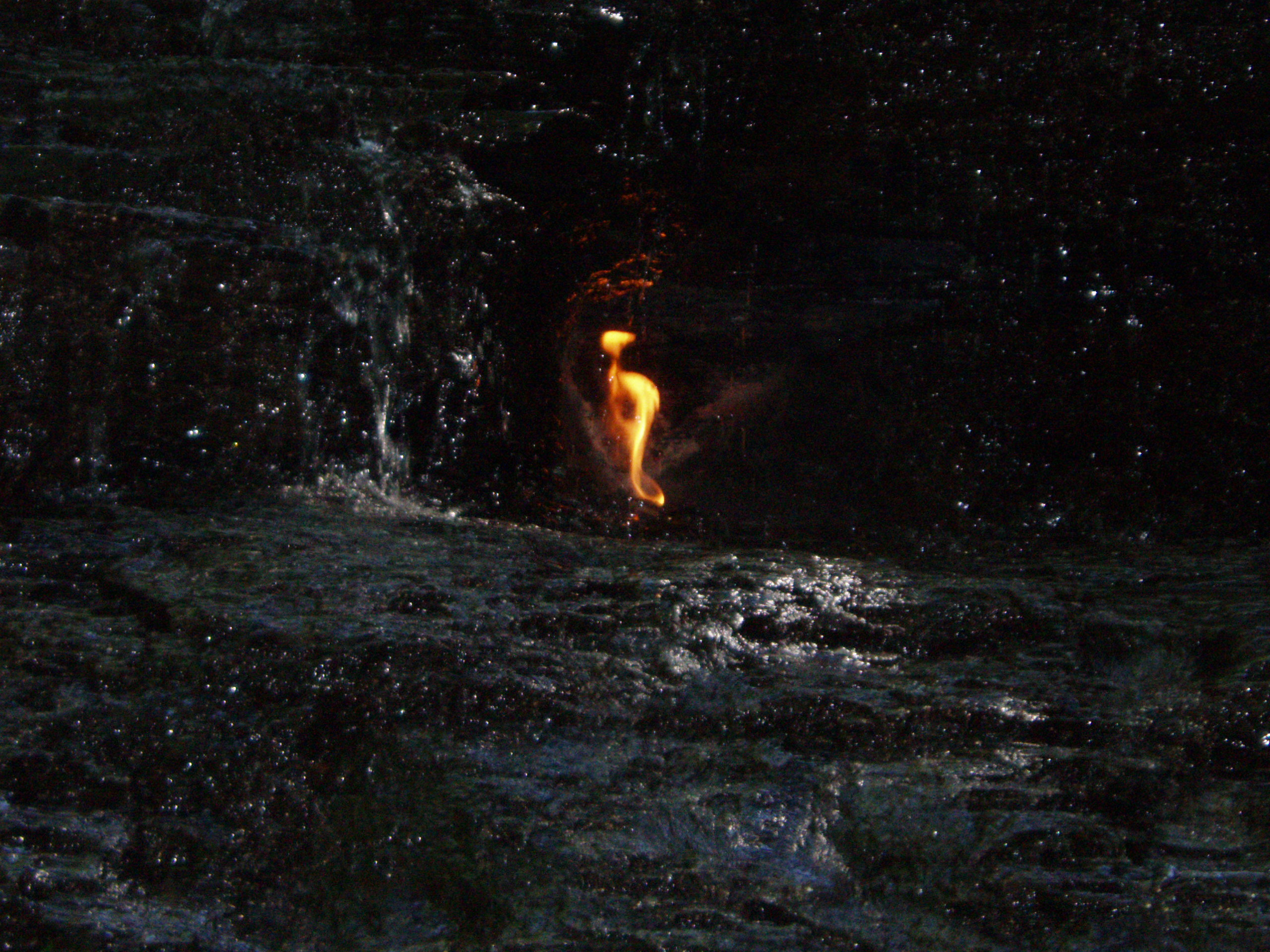

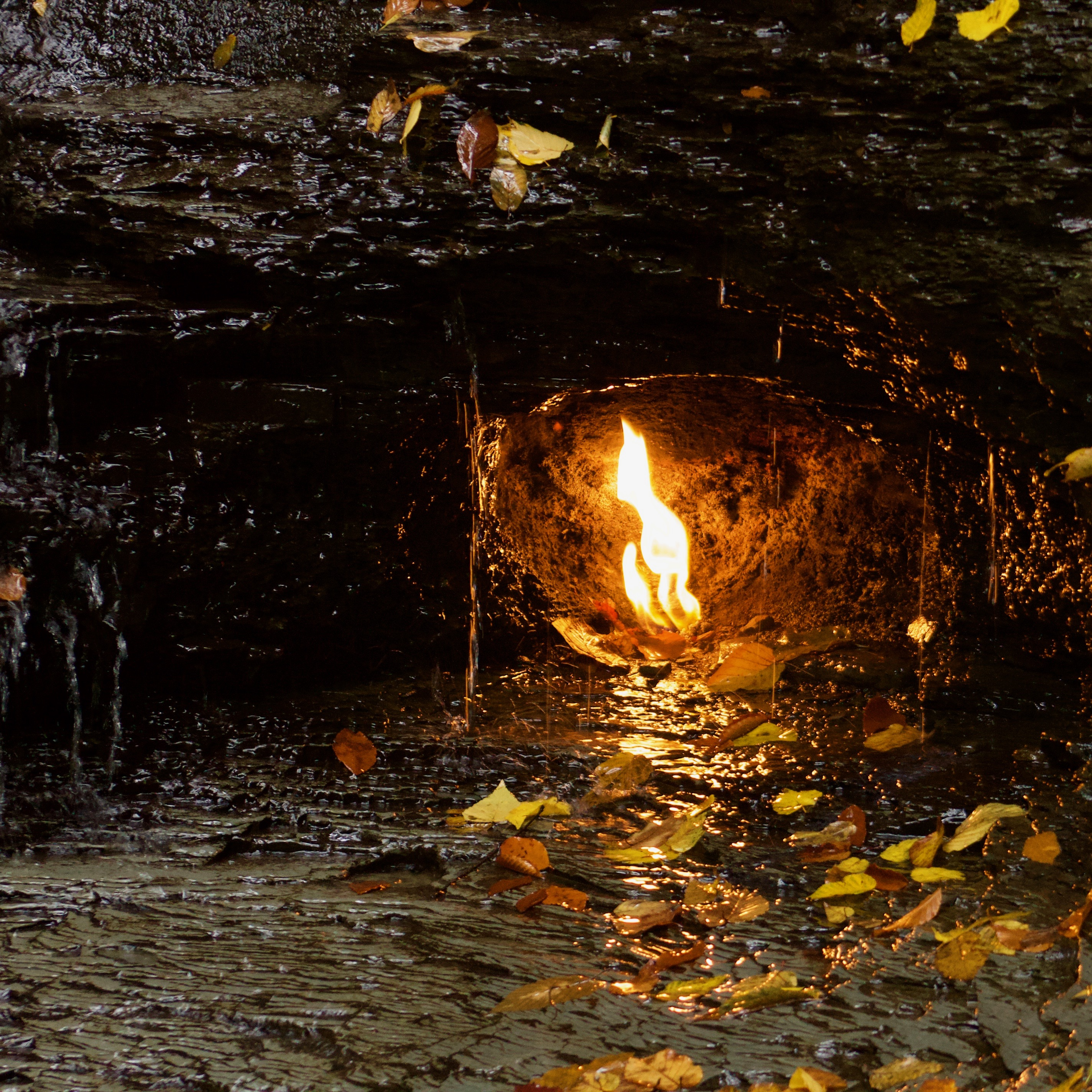

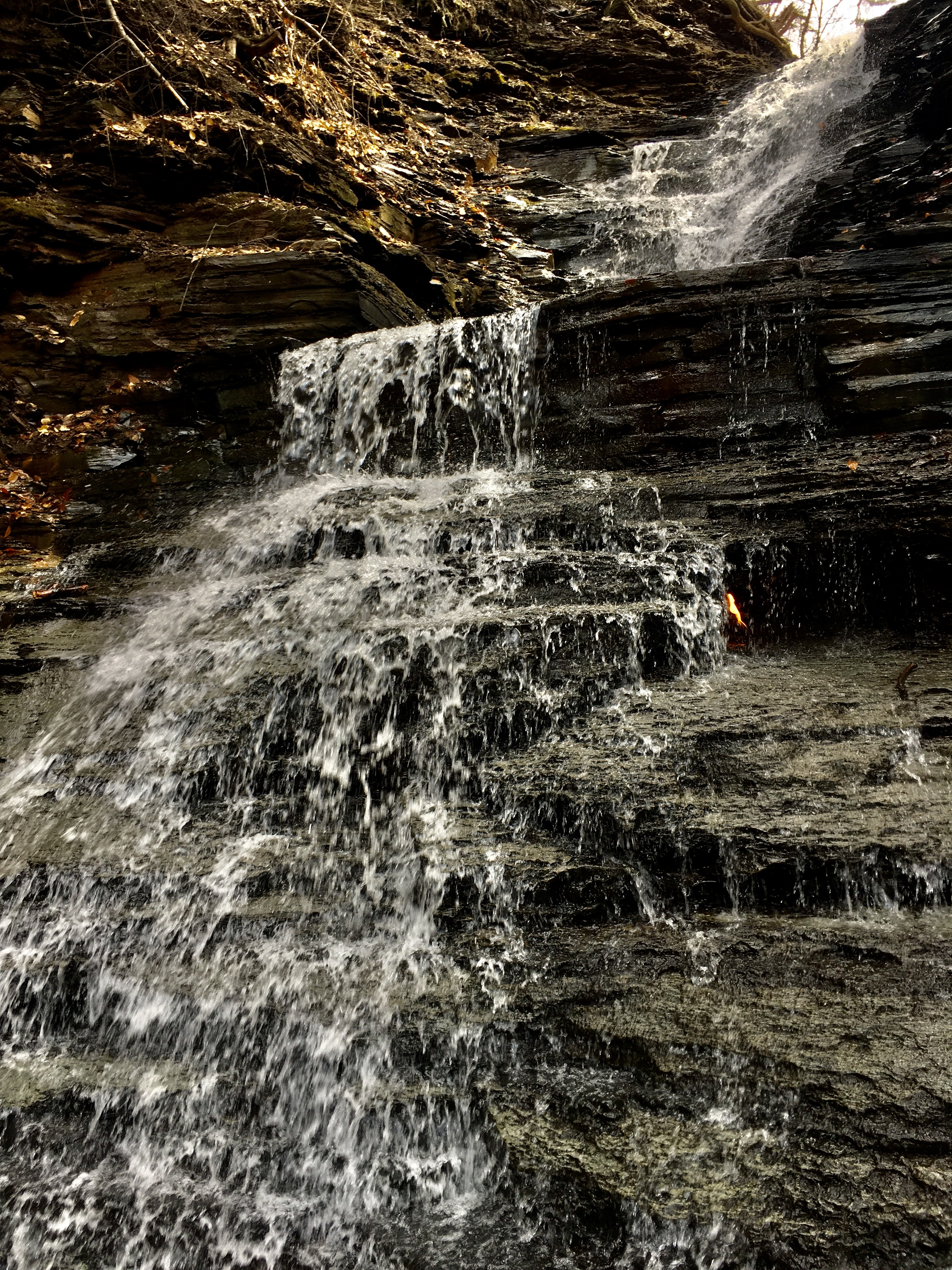

== See also ==
- Naturally fueled eternal flames
- List of waterfalls of New York
- List of waterfalls
