= Cashaqua Shale =

Geologic formation in New York, US

- Stratigraphic range: Devonian
- Type: Formation
- Unit of: Sonyea Group
- Underlies: West Falls Group
- Overlies: (see description)

Location
- Region: New York, Pennsylvania
- Country: United States
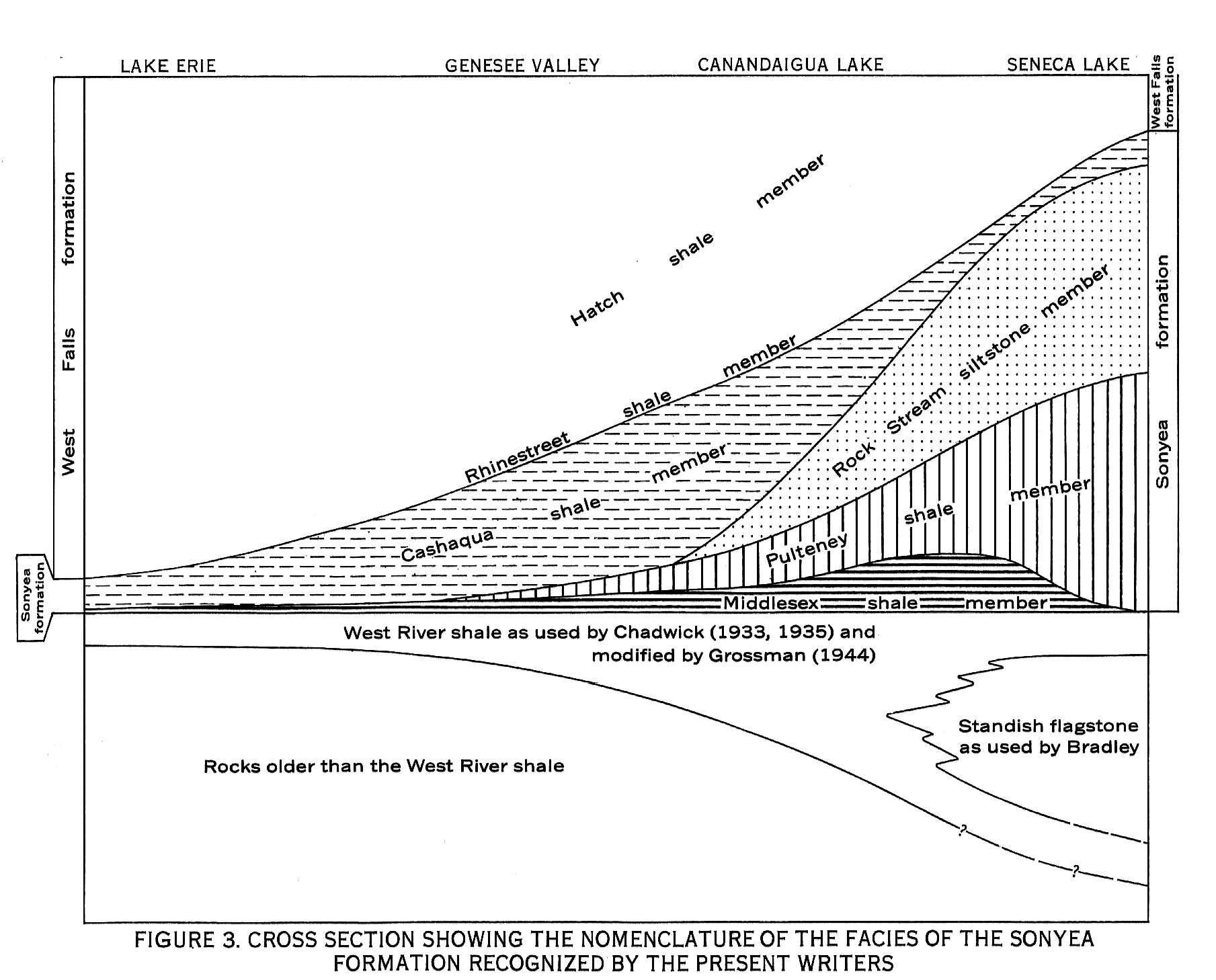
- The Cashaqua Shale and its various underlying members in western and west-central New York.

The Cashaqua Shale is a geologic formation in New York. It preserves fossils dating back to the Devonian period.

The Cashaqua shale underlies the Rhinestreet Shale member of the West Falls Group, and overlies various other members of the Sonyea Group. In the western part of New York State, it overlies the Middlesex Shale, and moving eastward, it overlies the Pulteney shale and then the Rock Stream Formation in west-central New York.
