= Ashokan Formation =

Geologic formation in eastern New York located in Catskill Mountains

- Stratigraphic range: Devonian, Givetian
- Type: Formation
- Unit of: Hamilton Group
- Underlies: Plattekill Formation, Manorkill Formation
- Overlies: Mount Marion Formation
- Thickness: Up to 600'

Lithology
- Primary: Sandstone, Mudstone, Shale
- Other: Flagstone

Location
- Region: New York
- Country: United States

Type section
- Named for: Named from exposures in Ashokan district, west of Kingston, NY
- Named by: Grabau A.W., 1917

The Ashokan Formation is a geologic formation in eastern New York located in the Catskill Mountains. This formation is Devonian in age. The formation consist cyclical beds of cross bedded dark grey sandstone, olive to brown mudstone and dark grey shale. The Ashokan was formed on the coastal fluvial delta platform to the west of the Taconic Mountains. This formation marks a time of transition from a marine environment to a fluvial/delta environment. This is evident both in the cyclical nature of the formation as well as the biodiversity represented being indictive of a brackish water environment(Goldring, 1935).

== Economic Uses ==
Bluestone was discovered in Ulster County, New York near what is now the Ashokan Reservoir by Silas Brainard, in 1831. This bluestone was what is not recognized as the Ashokan today. Silas began to quarry the stone and soon there was an industry build around it that employed up to ten thousand people at its peak. The bluestone was used for side walks and buildings of many towns in the area, including Kingston, New York and New York City. Around the beginning off the 20th century concrete with Portland cement was becoming the preferred building material and this marked the slow decline of the quarries over the next few decades.

== See also ==
List of fossiliferous stratigraphic units in New York
