= Utica Shale =

Stratigraphical unit of Upper Ordovician age in the Appalachian Basin

- Stratigraphic range: late Upper Ordovician
- Type: Geological formation
- Underlies: Lorraine Shale, Martinsburg Formation, and Reedsville Formation
- Overlies: Point Pleasant Formation, Trenton Group; Canajoharie shale
- Thickness: up to 500 feet (150 m)

Lithology
- Primary: Shale

Location
- Coordinates: 43.064°N 75.18°W
- Region: Appalachian Basin
- Country: Canada, United States

Type section
- Named for: Utica, New York
- Named by: Ebenezer Emmons, 1842

The Utica Shale is a stratigraphic unit of Upper Ordovician age in the Appalachian Basin. It underlies much of the northeastern United States and adjacent parts of Canada.

It takes its name from the city of Utica, New York, as it was first described from an outcrop along the Starch Factory Creek east of the city by Ebenezer Emmons in 1842.

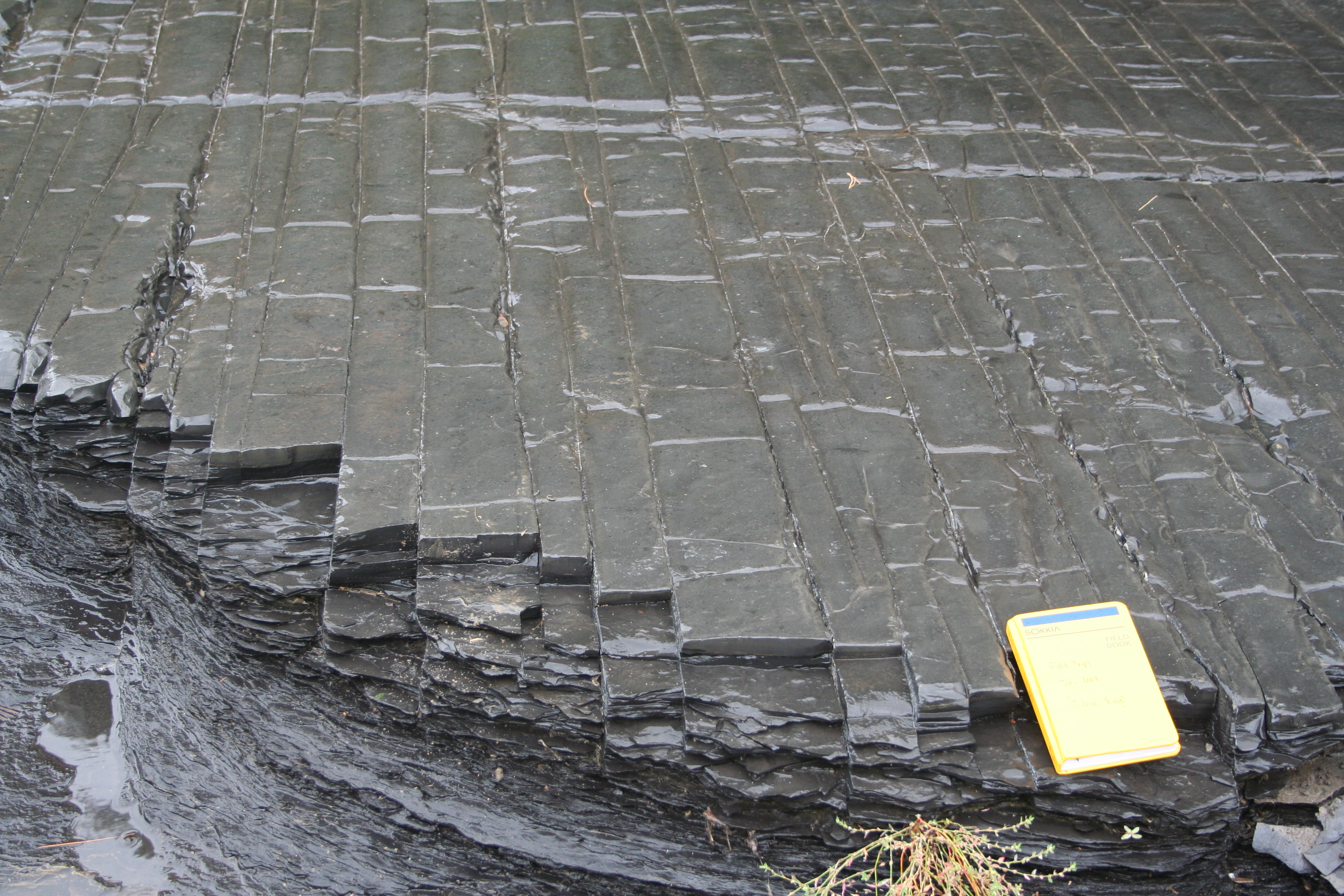
Rectangular joints within siltstone and black shales of the Utica Shale near Fort Plain, New York

== Lithology ==
The Utica Shale is composed of calcareous, organic, and rich shale.

== Oil and gas ==
The Utica shale is a major source of unconventional tight gas in Quebec, and is rapidly becoming so in Ohio.

=== Quebec ===
Drilling and producing from the Utica Shale began in 2006 in Quebec, focusing on an area south of the St. Lawrence River between Montreal and Quebec City. Interest has grown in the region since Denver-based Forest Oil Corp. announced a significant discovery there after testing two vertical wells. Forest Oil said its Quebec assets may hold as much as four trillion cubic feet of gas reserves, and that the Utica shale has similar rock properties to the Barnett Shale in Texas.

Forest Oil, which has several junior partners in the region, has drilled both vertical and horizontal wells. Calgary-based Talisman Energy has drilled five vertical Utica wells, and began drilling two horizontal Utica wells in late 2009 with its partner Questerre Energy, which holds under lease more than 1 million gross acres of land in the region. Other companies in the play are Quebec-based Gastem and Calgary-based Canbriam Energy.

The Utica Shale in Quebec potentially holds 4×10^{12} cu ft (110×10^{9} m^{3}) at production rates of 1×10^{6} cu ft (28,000 m^{3}) per day. From 2006 through 2009 24 wells, both vertical and horizontal, were drilled to test the Utica. Positive gas flow test results were reported, although none of the wells were producing at the end of 2009. Gastem, one of the Utica shale producers, took its Utica Shale expertise to drill across the border in New York state.

The province of Quebec imposed a moratorium on hydraulic fracturing in March 2012.

=== Ohio ===
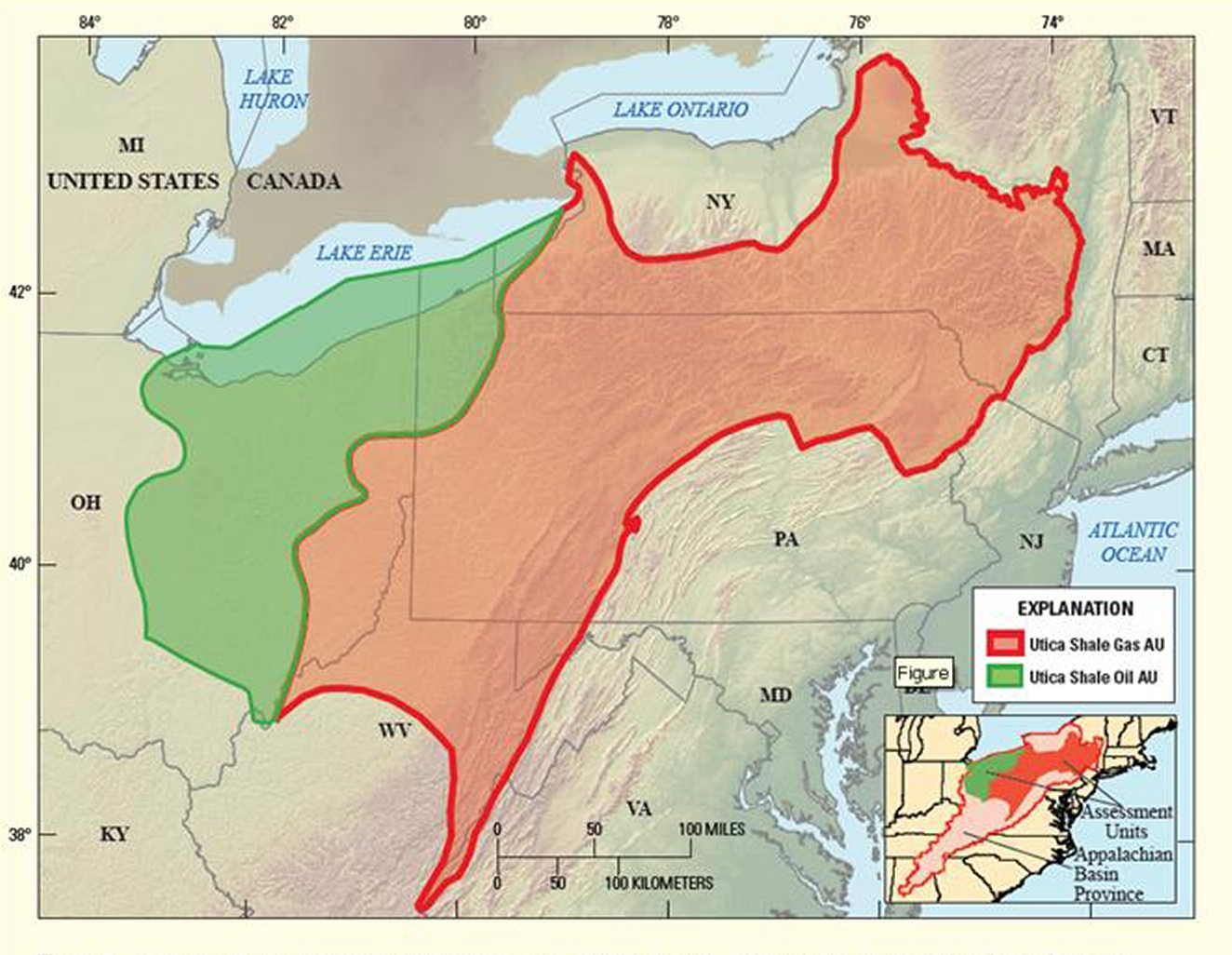
Map showing the location of the oil and gas assessment units (AU) for the Utica Shale in the Appalachian Basin Province

Utica Shale drilling and production began in Ohio in 2011. Ohio as of 2013 is becoming a major natural gas and oil producer from the Utica Shale in the eastern part of the state. Map of Ohio Utica Shale drilling permits and activity by date. In 2011 drilling and permits for drilling in the Utica Shale in Ohio reached record highs.

=== Pennsylvania ===
Companies like CNX Resources have had success expanding Utica Shale production in Pennsylvania, drilling its first Utica well in 2015 in Westmoreland County. In 2022, CNX formed a partnership with the Pittsburgh International Airport in Allegheny County to develop Utica shale on airport property and convert it to LNG and CNG for use in fueling aviation and other machinery.

=== New York ===
In 2009, the Canadian company Gastem, which had been drilling gas wells into the Utica Shale in Quebec, drilled the first of its three state-permitted Utica Shale wells in New York. The first well drilled was in Otsego County.

New York imposed a moratorium on large-volume hydraulic fracturing in 2008. This was renewed by Governor Andrew Cuomo in 2014, and continues as of December 2017.

=== Resource size ===
The US Energy Information Administration estimated in 2012 that the Utica Shale in the US held 15.7 trillion cubic feet of unproved, technically recoverable gas. The average well was estimated to produce 1.13 billion cubic feet of gas. The same year, the US Geological Survey estimated that the Utica Shale had 38.2 trillion cubic feet of undiscovered technically recoverable gas, 940 million barrels of oil, and 208 million barrels of natural gas liquids.

In 2022, a team of researchers in a paper published in Energy Policy identified the Utica Shale as a "carbon bomb," a fossil fuel project that would result in more than one gigaton of carbon dioxide emissions if fully extracted and burnt.

== Distribution ==
The Utica Shale lies under most of New York, Pennsylvania, Ohio, and West Virginia, and extends under adjacent parts of Ontario and Quebec in Canada and Kentucky, Maryland, Tennessee, and Virginia in the United States.

It occurs in outcrops in the state of New York and in the subsurface in the provinces of Quebec and Ontario.

Parts of the Utica shale underlie the Island of Montreal, and its weakness relative to the Trenton and Chazy limestones under much of the rest of the island complicated the construction of the Montreal metro. Some stations had to be built cut-and-cover or with a narrow split platform profile to reduce the load on the bedrock. In particular, De l'Église station suffered a cave-in during construction and had to be hastily replanned.

In some regions of Pennsylvania, the Utica Shale reaches to almost two miles below sea level. However, the depth of the Utica Shale rock decreases to the west into Ohio and to the northwest towards Canada.

It reaches a thickness of up to 1,000 feet (300 m) and can be as thin as 70 feet (20 m) towards the margins of the basin. 250 feet (80 m) are exposed in the type section.

== Relationship to other units ==
The Utica Shale underlies the Lorraine Group and overlies the Trenton Group limestone and the Canajoharie shale in the Mohawk River valley.

The Utica Shale is divided into the Nowadaga Zone, Loyal Creek Zone and Holland Patent Zone.

It lies a few thousand feet under the Marcellus Shale.
