= Pulteney shale =

Geologic formation in New York

Pulteney Shale
- Stratigraphic range: Frasnian
- Type: Formation
- Unit of: Sonyea Group
- Underlies: Rock Stream Formation
- Overlies: Middlesex Shale

Lithology
- Primary: Shale

Location
- Region: New York
- Country: United States

The Pulteney Shale is a geologic formation in New York. It preserves fossils dating back to the Devonian period.

== See also ==
- List of fossiliferous stratigraphic units in New York
