= Decker Formation =

Geologic formation in New York

- Stratigraphic range: Silurian
- Type: Formation
- Underlies: Rondout Formation
- Overlies: Bossardville Limestone

Location
- Region: New York
- Country: United States

The Decker Formation is a geologic formation in New York. It preserves fossils dating back to the Silurian period.

== See also ==
- List of fossiliferous stratigraphic units in New York
