= Chrysler Formation =

Geologic formation in New York

- Stratigraphic range: Silurian / Devonian
- Type: Formation
- Underlies: Helderberg limestones
- Overlies: Cobleskill Fm.
- Thickness: 30-50 feet

Lithology
- Primary: dolomite
- Other: Shaly intervals

Location
- Extent: Syracuse east to near Albany, N.Y.

Type section
- Named for: Chrysler Glen near Syracuse, N.Y.

The Chrysler Formation is a geologic formation in New York. It preserves fossils dating back to the Silurian / Devonian period.

== See also ==
- List of fossiliferous stratigraphic units in New York
