= Greenfield Center, New York =

- Hamlet
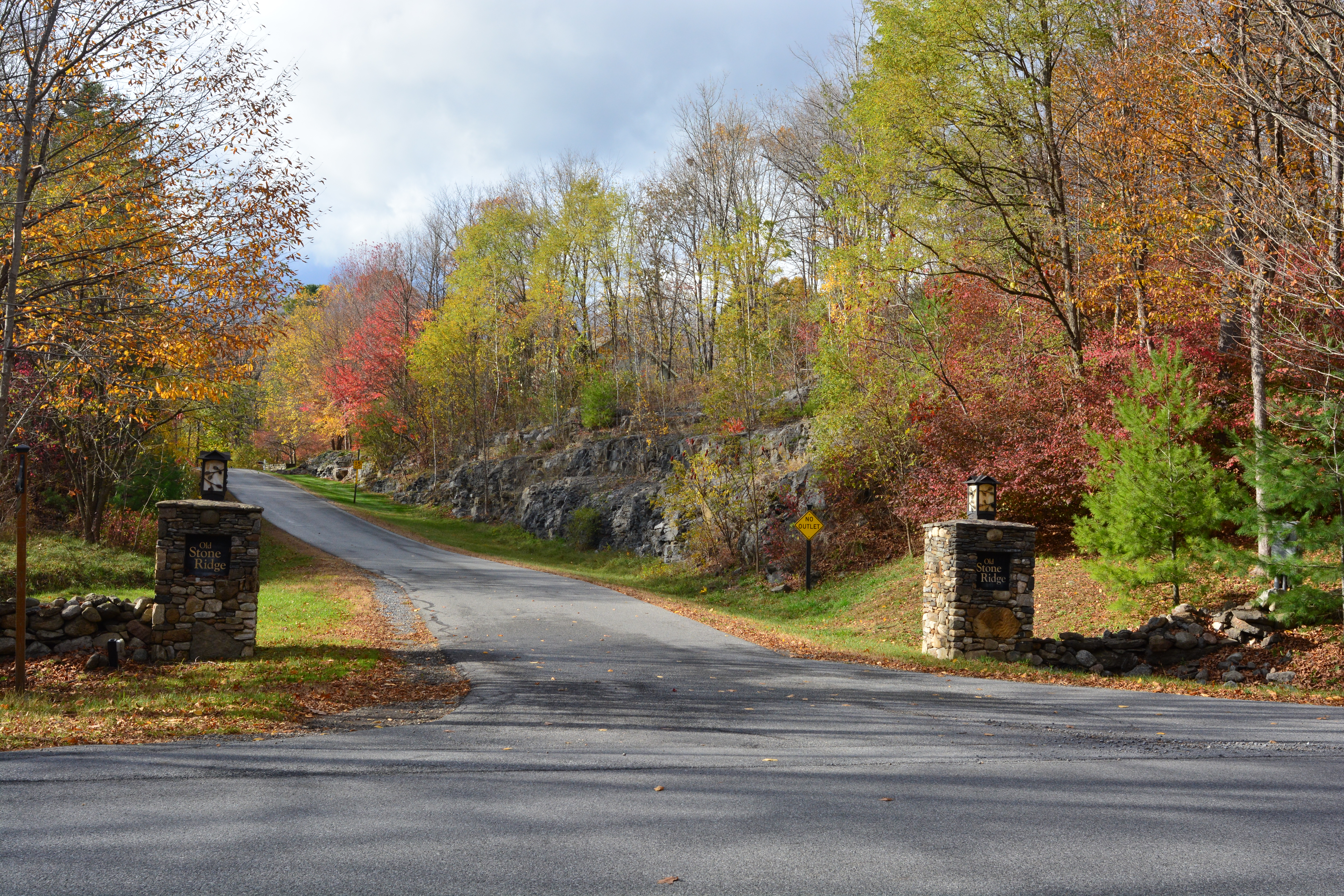
- Along Old Stone Road in Greenfield Center, you can see Hoyt Limestone; lime from this formation was used in the late 19th Century to remedy the area's sandy soils.

- Location within New York Location within the United States
- Coordinates: 43°07′42″N 73°50′47″W
- Country: United States
- State: New York
- County: Saratoga
- Elevation: 686 ft (209 m)
- Time zone: UTC-5 (Eastern (EST))
  - Summer (DST): UTC-4 (EDT)
- ZIP code: 12833
- Area codes: 518 & 838
- GNIS feature ID: 951743

Greenfield Center is a hamlet in Saratoga County, New York, United States. The community is located along New York State Route 9N, 4.4 miles (7.1 km) northwest of Saratoga Springs. Greenfield Center has a post office with ZIP code 12833, which opened on February 16, 1831.

Greenfield Center was formed in 1793 and has grown to a population of approximately 7,400.

Lester Park in Greenfield Center includes remnants of the Hoyt family quarry and kilns, as well as exposed stromatolites.
