= Austin Glen Member =

Geological formation

- Stratigraphic range: Darriwilian
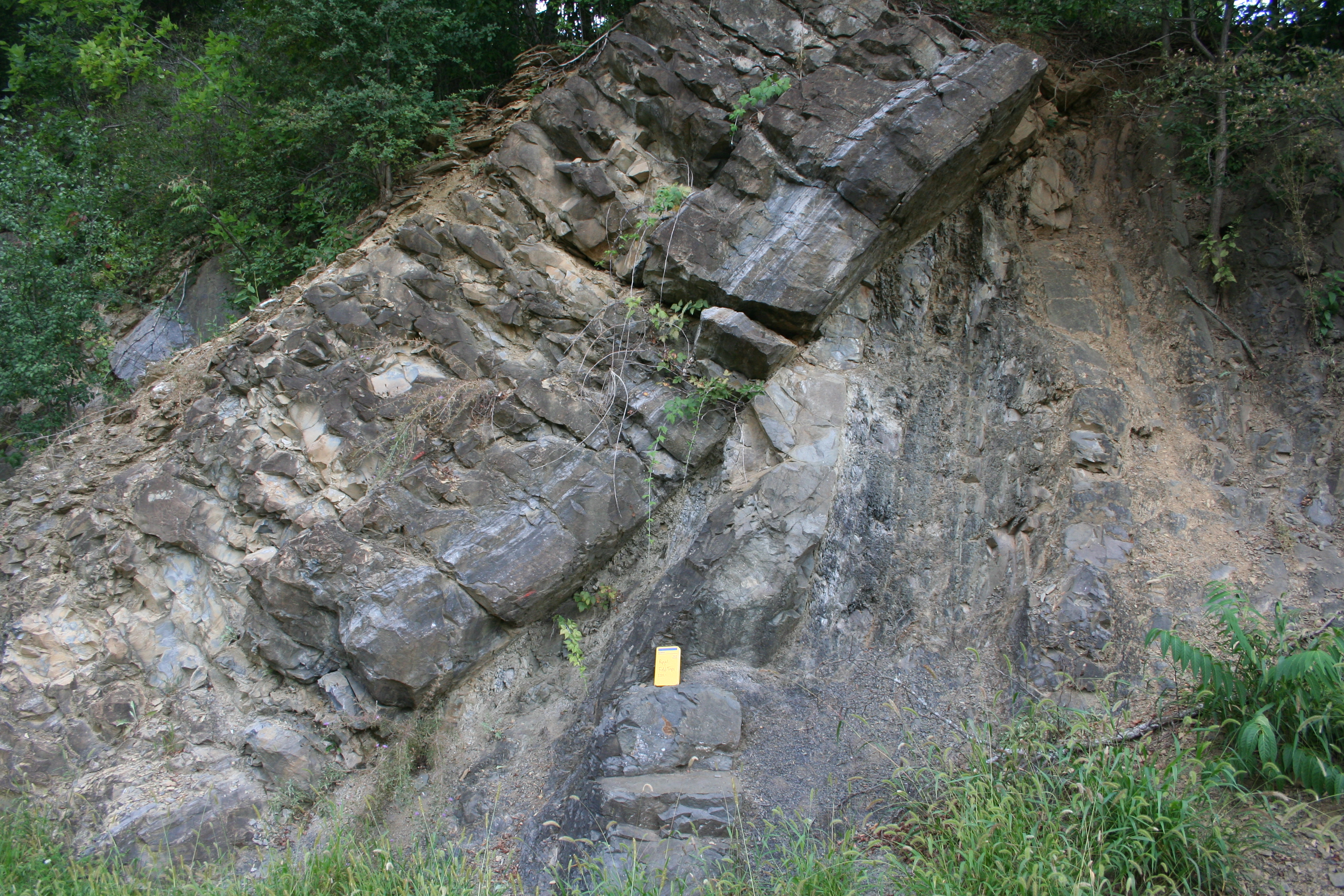
- The taconic unconformity overlies the Austin Glen Member near Catskill, NY

Location
- Region: Eastern North America

The Austin Glen Member of the Normanskill Formation is an upper Middle Ordovician unit of interbedded greywackes and shales that outcrops in eastern New York State. It was deposited in a deep marine setting in a foreland basin during the Taconic orogeny. Its sediment source was mainly the erosion of preexisting sedimentary rocks. Graptolite fossils place it in the stratigraphic zones of Nemagraptus gracilis and Climacograptus bicornis, but its age could be Llandeilo or Trentonian (earliest to latest Darriwilian, 450 to 465 million years ago).
