= Oneida Formation =

Geological formation in New York

- Stratigraphic range: Silurian
- Type: Formation

Location
- Region: New York
- Country: United States

The Oneida Formation is a geologic formation in New York. It contains fossils dating to the Silurian period.

== See also ==
- List of fossiliferous stratigraphic units in New York
