= Cobleskill Formation =

Geological Formation in New York

- Stratigraphic range: Silurian
- Type: Formation
- Unit of: Bertie Formation

Location
- Region: New York
- Country: United States

The Cobleskill Formation is a geologic formation in New York. It preserves fossils dating back to the Silurian period.

== See also ==
- List of fossiliferous stratigraphic units in New York
