= Burket Shale =

Burket shale
- Stratigraphic range: Upper Devonian; Frasnian; ~383–382 Ma
- Type: Member
- Unit of: Harrell Shale, Genesee Group
- Overlies: Tully Limestone

Lithology
- Primary: Black shale
- Other: Shale

Location
- Region: New York, Ohio, Pennsylvania, West Virginia
- Country: United States

Type section
- Named for: Named after a small town in Blair County Pennsylvania
- Named by: Charles Butts (1918)

The Burket Shale or Geneseo Shale is the lowest member of the Harrell Shale/Genessee Group.

The Burket is an organic-rich black shale that rests just above the Tully Limestone member of the Mahantango Formation. The geographical extent of the formation includes southern New York, Pennsylvania, eastern Ohio, and West Virginia. The Burket is also known as the Geneseo in New York and parts of Northern Pennsylvania. In 1918 the Burket and Harrell were described by Charles Butts, from outcrops located in Blair County, located in southwestern Pennsylvania. In 1920, C. H. Chadwick described the Genesee and Geneseo formations in New York. The usage of the different names is just a matter of personal preference.

== Description ==
This organic shale is blackish gray, it may also have an olive, brown or grayish. Subsurface the bedding is massive. Where fracturing occurs Pyrite and Calcite may fill the fractures.
