= Whitehall Formation =

Geologic formation in New York, United States

- Stratigraphic range: Ordovician
- Type: Formation

Location
- Region: New York
- Country: United States

The Whitehall Formation is a geologic formation in New York. It preserves fossils dating back to the Ordovician period.

== See also ==
- List of fossiliferous stratigraphic units in New York
