= Naples Group =

- Stratigraphic range: Devonian
- Type: Group

Location
- Region: New York
- Country: United States

The Naples Group is a geologic group in New York. It preserves fossils dating back to the Devonian period.

== See also ==
- List of fossiliferous stratigraphic units in New York
