= Hoyt Limestone =

Geological formation

- Stratigraphic range: Cambrian
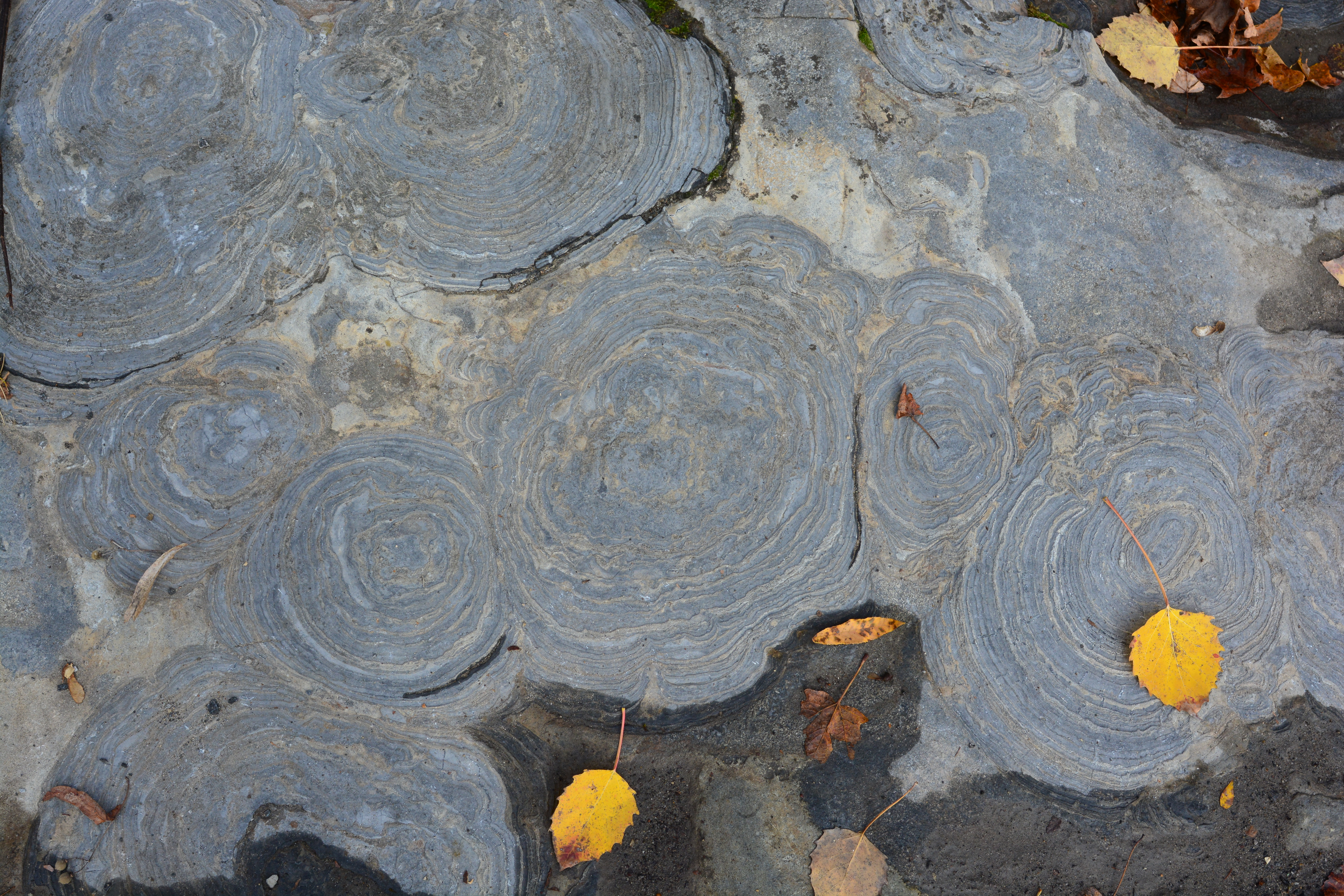
- Exposed Hoyt Limestone (with a few autumn leaves) in Lester Park, Greenfield Center, New York.
- Type: Formation

Location
- Region: New York
- Country: United States

The Hoyt Limestone is a geologic formation in New York. It preserves fossils of the Cambrian period.

== See also ==
- List of fossiliferous stratigraphic units in New York
