= Harrell Shale =

Mapped bedrock in the United States

Harrell Shale Group
- Stratigraphic range: Frasnian
- Type: Group
- Sub-units: Burket Shale
- Underlies: Brallier Formation, Sonyea Formation, Trimmers Rock Formation
- Overlies: Mahantango Formation, Millboro Shale, and Tully Limestone

Lithology
- Primary: shale, sandstone

Location
- Region: Appalachian Mountains
- Country: United States

Type section
- Named by: Charles Butts, 1918

The Devonian Harrell Formation is a mapped bedrock unit in Pennsylvania, Maryland, West Virginia, and Virginia.

== Description ==
The Harrell Formation was first described by Charles Butts in 1918. Hasson and Dennison (1978) state "The Harrell Shale consists of very dark gray, thinly laminated, platy- to sheety-weathering shale underlain in certain areas by the grayish black shale of the Burket Member."

=== Fossils ===
Hasson and Dennison reported the following fossils from several outcrops of the Harrell:

- Bivalvia: Buchiola livonae (?), B. retrostriata, Paracardium doris, Pterochaenia fragilis, Lunlulicardium (?)
- Cephalopoda: Bactrites aciculum, Probeloceras lutheri
- Cricoconarida: Styliolina fissurella

=== Notable Exposures ===
Type locality is at Horrell Station, Blair County, Pennsylvania (40°27′N 78°17′W). In 1918, when Butts described and named the type section, the USGS topo map spelled the location "Harrell", but the local spelling was "Horrell".

== Age ==
Relative age dating places the Harrell in the late Devonian.
