= Rose Hill Formation =

Geologic formation in West Virginia, United States

- Stratigraphic range: Telychian
- Type: Formation
- Underlies: Keefer Formation
- Overlies: Tuscarora Formation

Location
- Region: Appalachia and Southeastern United States
- Country: United States
- Extent: Maryland, Virginia, and West Virginia, United States

The Rose Hill Formation is a geologic formation in West Virginia, United States. This formation dates back to the Silurian period, and is a source of iron ore for nearby foundries.

== History ==
The region has historically had numerous names by different geological agencies. West Virginia adopted the name Rose Hill Formation, and the name appears on the Geologic Map of West Virginia.
