= West Castleton Formation =

Geologic formation in New York

- Stratigraphic range: Cambrian
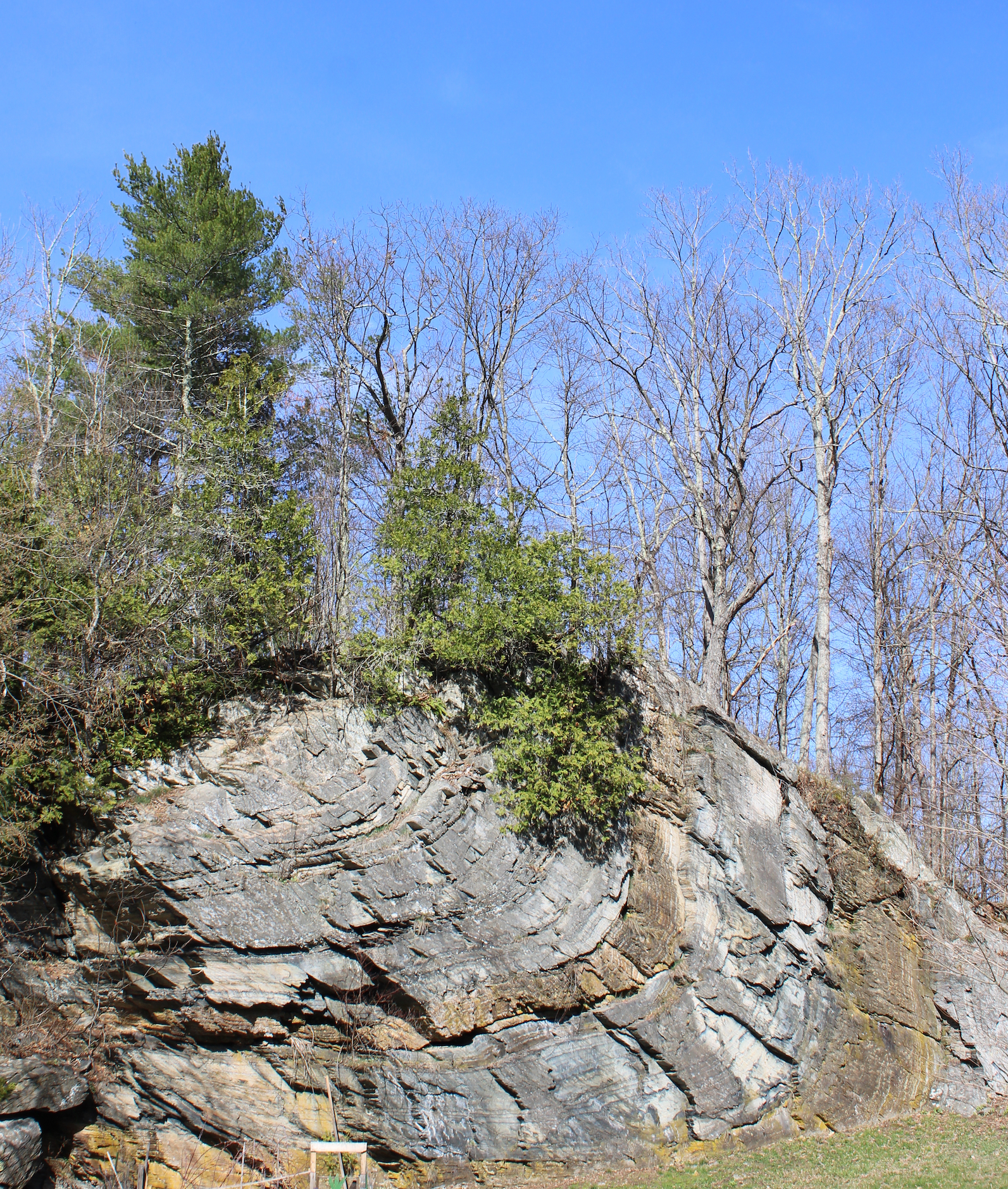
- Exposed syncline of the West Castleton Formation in the village of West Castleton, VT.
- Type: Metamorphic
- Sub-units: Beebe Limestone Member

Lithology
- Primary: Slate, Phyllite
- Other: dolostone, quartzite, Arkose

Location
- Region: New York, Vermont
- Country: United States

Type section
- Named for: West Castleton, Vermont
- Named by: E-An Zen

The West Castleton Formation is a geologic formation in New York and Vermont. It preserves fossils dating back to the Cambrian period.

It is described in Vermont as "Gray silicious to black, graphitic, pyritiferous slate and phyllite, locally with interbedded thin dark grey dolostone and grey quartzite and arkosic layers. Thin, white sandy laminae commonly found in the graphitic beds."

== Type Section ==
The type section is a roadcut along Scotch Hill Road, south of West Castleton, Vermont.

== See also ==
- List of fossiliferous stratigraphic units in New York
