= Rock Stream Formation =

Geologic formation in New York, United States

- Stratigraphic range: Frasnian
- Type: Formation
- Unit of: Sonyea Group
- Underlies: Cashaqua Shale
- Overlies: Pulteney shale

Lithology
- Primary: Siltstone
- Other: Shale

Location
- Region: New York
- Country: United States

The Rock Stream Formation (or Rock Stream siltstone) is a geologic formation in New York. It preserves fossils dating back to the Devonian period.

== See also ==
- List of fossiliferous stratigraphic units in New York
