= Clinton Group =

Mapped unit of rock in North America

Coordinates: 40°44′05″N 77°46′42″W

- Stratigraphic range: Early Silurian
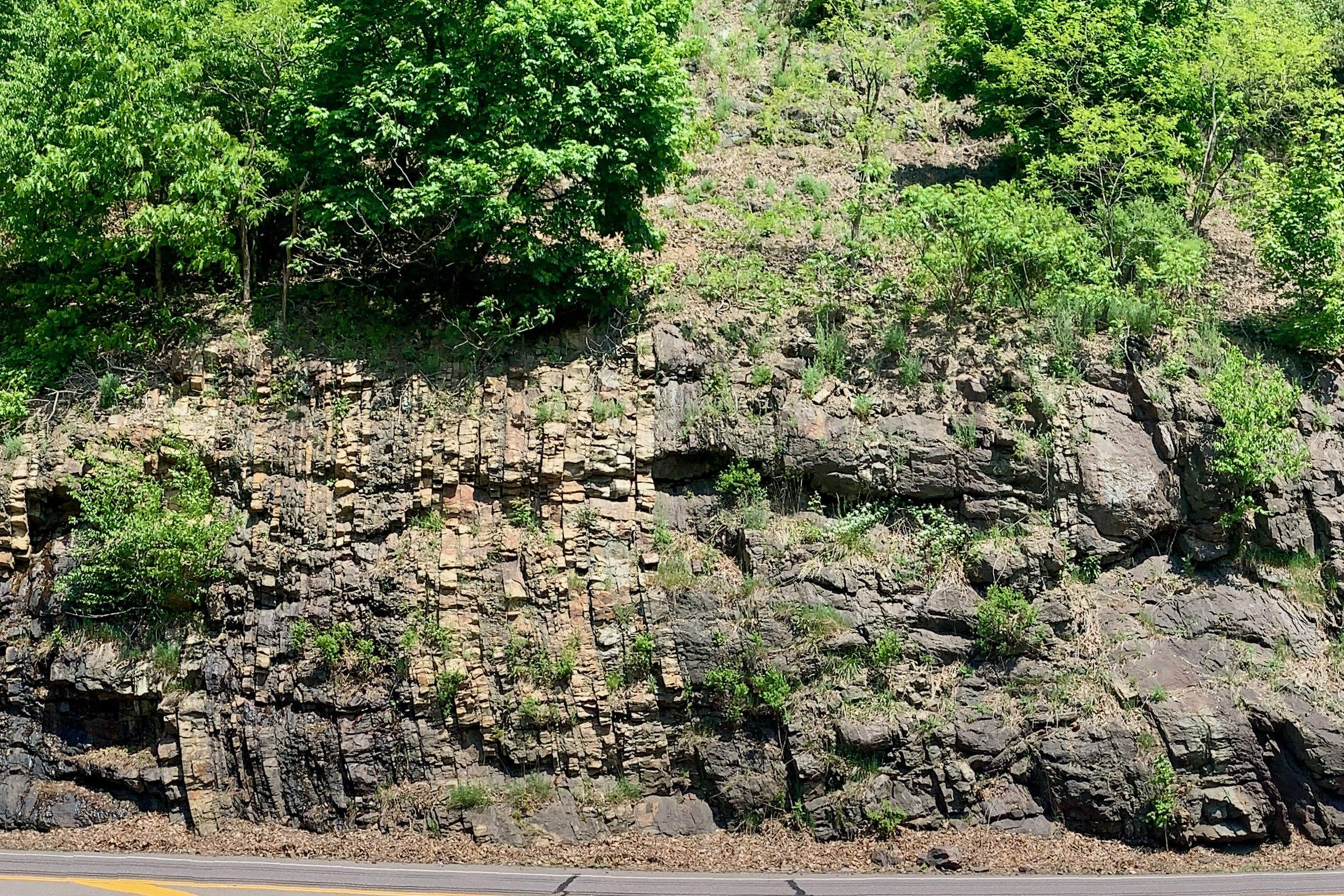
- Rocks of the Clinton Group on the east face of Schuylkill Gap
- Type: Geological formation
- Sub-units: Rochester Shale, Irondequoit Formation, Rose Hill Formation, Keefer Formation
- Underlies: Bloomsburg Formation in Pennsylvania, Lockport Group in New York
- Overlies: Tuscarora Formation in Pennsylvania, Clinch Formation in Virginia, Tennessee, and Maryland, Medina Group in New York
- Thickness: 1640 ft

Lithology
- Primary: sandstone, shale, and limestone
- Other: Ironstone and conglomerate,

Location
- Region: Appalachian Basin of eastern North America
- Country: United States
- Extent: Ohio, Pennsylvania, Maryland, New York, West Virginia

Type section
- Named for: Clinton, New York
- Named by: Lardner Vanuxem (1842)

The Clinton Group (also referred to as the Clinton Formation or the Clinton Shale) is a mapped unit of sedimentary rock found throughout eastern North America. The interval was first defined by the geologist Lardner Vanuxem, who derived the name from the village of Clinton in Oneida County, New York, where several well exposed outcrops of these strata can be found. The Clinton Group and its lateral equivalents extend throughout much of the Appalachian Foreland Basin, a major structural and depositional province extending from New York to Alabama. The term has been employed in Kentucky, Maryland, Michigan, New York, Ohio, Pennsylvania, Tennessee, Virginia, and West Virginia, though in many of these areas the same interval is referred to as the Rose Hill, Rockwood, or Red Mountain Formations. Historically the term "Clinton" has also been assigned to several lower Silurian stratigraphic units in Ohio and Kentucky which are now known to be significantly older than the Clinton Group as it was originally defined. Many parts of this succession are richly fossiliferous, making the Clinton Group an important record of marine life during the early Silurian. Several economically valuable rock-types are found within this interval, though it is perhaps best known as a significant source of iron ore

Stratigraphically, the Clinton Group overlies the coarse siliciclastics of the Medina Group in New York, The Albion Group in the Subsurface of Ohio, the Clinch Sandstone in Virginia and West Virginia, and the Tuscarora Sandstone in Pennsylvania. It is overlain by the shales and carbonates of the Lockport Group in New York, the McKenzie Formation in Pennsylvania, and the Sneedville Limestone in Tennessee. Owing to the great difference in resistivity between the relatively soft, readily weathering Clinton Group and the massive dolomites of the overlying Lockport, the former tends to erode preferentially out from underneath the latter. This has resulted in the formation of numerous cataracts such as Niagara Falls and the High Falls of Rochester, New York, which are but local manifestations of a regional geographic feature called the Niagara Escarpment.

== Description ==
The Clinton Group (or Formation) is a widely traceable, lower Silurian lithostratigraphic unit composed primarily of shale and mudstone, though it encompasses a heterogeneous assemblage of sedimentary rock types, including conglomerate, sandstone, limestone, dolomite, and ironstone. In its designated type area in Clinton, Oneida County, New York the unit is approximately 50 meters (180 feet) thick, and composed primarily of blue-grey mudstone, shale, and sandstone with several discrete ferruginous horizons, known colloquially as "Clinton Ironstones". The lateral equivalent of these beds to the south is the Rose Hill Formation of Pennsylvania, and olive-gray to drab, thin-bedded sandstone.

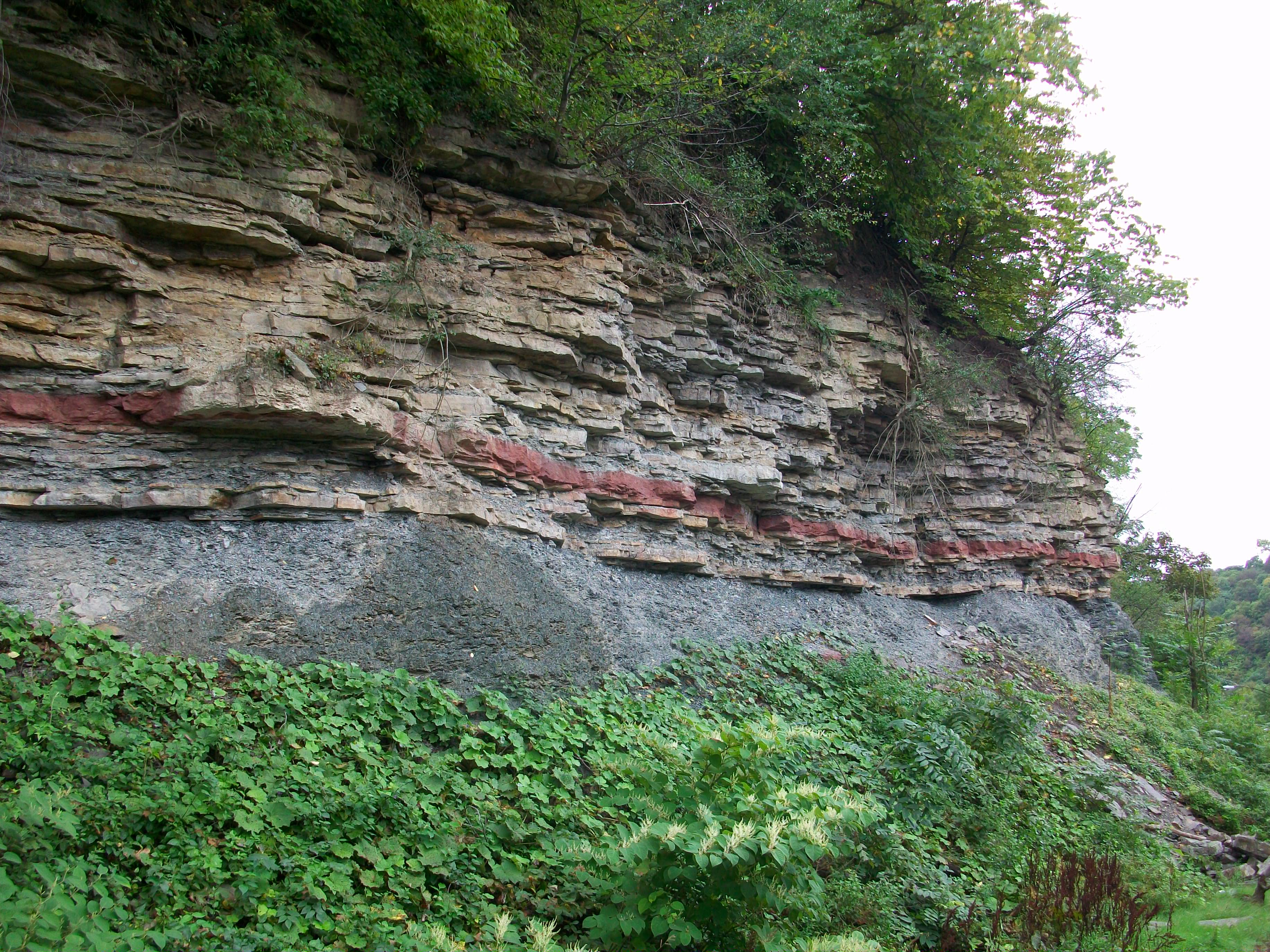
An outcrop of Clinton Group Strata exposed at Seth Greene Drive in Rochester, New York. Pictured is the Reynales Limestone overlying the Maplewood Shale. The prominent bright red band is the Furnaceville (Ironstone) Member of the Reynales.

== Economic uses ==
In Maryland, the Rose Hill Formation contained the Cresaptown Iron Sandstone.

== Age ==
Relative age dating of the Clinton Group places it in the Lower Silurian period. It rests conformably atop the Tuscarora Formation and conformably below the Lower and Upper Silurian Lockport Group and Bloomsburg Formation.

== See also ==
- Geology of Pennsylvania
