= Middlesex Formation =

Geologic formation in the United States

- Stratigraphic range: Frasnian
- Type: Formation
- Unit of: Sonyea Group
- Underlies: Cashaqua Shale or Pulteney shale
- Overlies: Genesee Group
- Thickness: 6–75 feet (23 m)

Lithology
- Primary: Black Shale

Location
- Region: Maryland, New York, Ohio, Pennsylvania, West Virginia
- Country: United States

Type section
- Named for: Town of Middlesex, NY

The Middlesex Formation is a carbon rich black shale geologic formation found in the Appalachian Basin. It represents one of several transgressive events (rising sea levels) during the Late Devonian.

== Description ==
The Middlesex is a laminated, dark grey to black formation comprising mudstone and siltstone. It developed in an anoxic environment. Further evidence of this is the lack of bioturbation. There are also sparse sand and silt layers, suggesting that they were single event deposits.
