= Camarotoechia contracta =

Camarotoechia contracta Temporal range: Devonian

Scientific classification
- Kingdom: Animalia
- Phylum: Brachiopoda
- Class: Rhynchonellata
- Order: Rhynchonellida
- Family: †Trigonirhynchiidae
- Genus: †Camarotoechia
- Species: †C. contracta

Binomial name
- †Camarotoechia contracta (Hall, 1843)

Species of brachiopod

Camarotoechia contracta is a species of brachiopod from the Late Devonian. This articulate brachiopod was discovered in North America, in Warren, Pennsylvania, in strata that is a part of the Chemung Group. This specimen is also recorded in the United States Synopsis of American Fossil Brachiopoda by Charles Schuchert which was printed in 1897.

Currently, a Camarotoechia contracta fossil can be found in the Yale Peabody Museum of Natural History in New Haven, Connecticut.
