= Sonyea Formation =

Geologic group

Sonyea Group
- Stratigraphic range: Frasnian
- Type: Group
- Unit of: Frasnian
- Sub-units: See text
- Underlies: West Falls Group
- Overlies: Genesee Group and Harrell Shale

Lithology
- Primary: Shale
- Other: Siltstone

Location
- Region: Appalachian Basin of eastern North America
- Country: United States
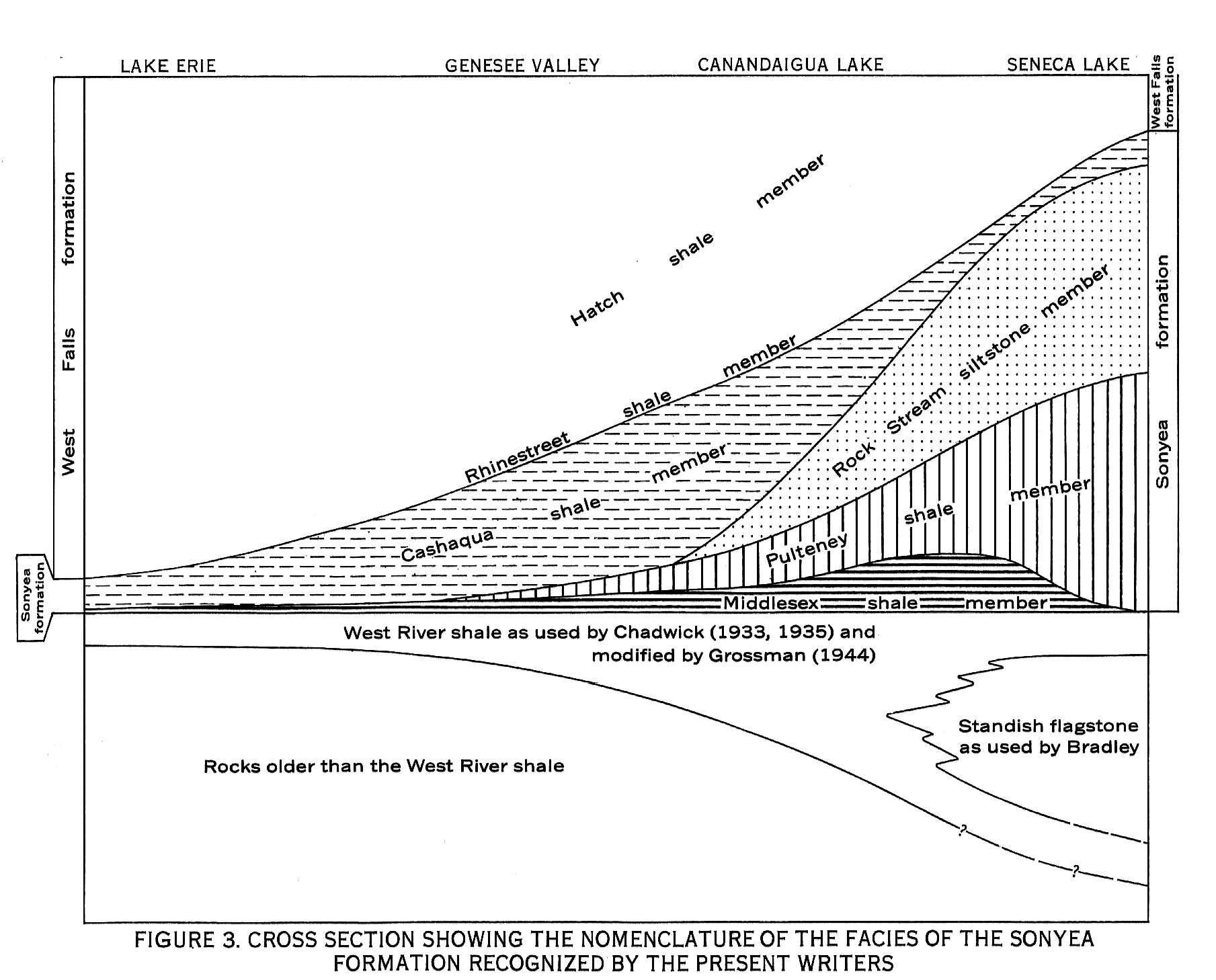
- Stratigraphic cross-section of the Sonyea Formation in New York State

The Sonyea Group is a geologic group in the northern part of the Appalachian Basin. It preserves fossils dating back to the Devonian period.

In the western part, it is divided into the Cashaqua Shale at the top, and the Middlesex Shale at the bottom. In the east, various shale formations are included between the Cashaqua and Middlesex members, including Rye Point Shale, Rock Stream Formation ("Enfield Formation") Siltstone, Pulteney shale, Sawmill Creek Shale, Johns Creek Shale and Montour Shale.

== See also ==
- List of fossiliferous stratigraphic units in Pennsylvania
- Paleontology in Pennsylvania
