= Reynales Formation =

Geologic formation in New York, United States

- Stratigraphic range: Silurian
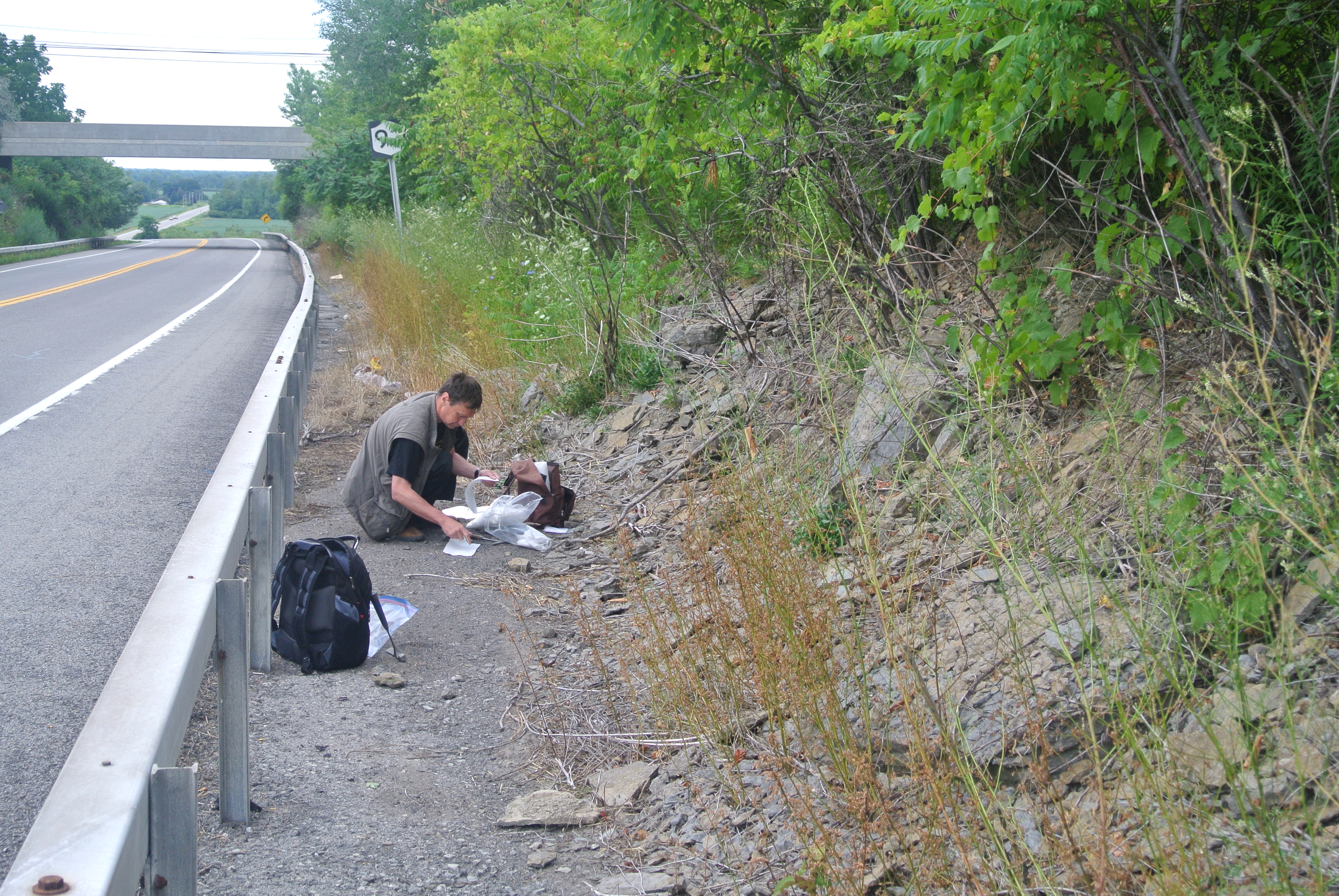
- Paleontologist studying the Reynales Formation (Silurian) in Hickory Corners, New York.
- Type: Formation

Location
- Region: New York
- Country: United States

The Reynales Formation is a geologic formation in New York. It preserves fossils dating back to the Silurian period.

== See also ==
- List of fossiliferous stratigraphic units in New York
