= Java Group =

Geologic formation in the United States

- Stratigraphic range: Late Devonian
- Type: Group
- Sub-units: Pipe Creek Shale; Wiscoy Sandstone Member; Hanover Shale Member
- Underlies: Ohio Shale
- Overlies: West Falls Formation
- Thickness: Up to more than 200'

Lithology
- Primary: Shale
- Other: Siltstone, Sandstone

Location
- Region: Kentucky; New York; Ohio; Pennsylvania; Tennessee; Virginia; West Virginia
- Country: United States

Type section
- Named for: Java Township, Wyoming County, New York
- Named by: Wallace de Witt, Jr. (December 01, 1960)

The Java Group is a Geologic group in New York and Northern Pennsylvania. It is considered geologic formation in Kentucky, Western New York, Ohio, southern and western Pennsylvania, Tennessee, Virginia, West Virginia. In Virginia it is a member of Chattanooga Shale. It dates back to the Devonian period.

== Stratigraphy ==
The Java is made up of cyclical deposits of transgressive and regressive sea levels. Each of these cycles is a separate unit within the Java. These units are as follows Pipe Creek Shale, Wiscoy Formation New York, and Hanover Shale. This group also hosts to two mass extinction events the lower Kellwasser event and the upper Kellwasser event.

The uppermost formation is the Hanover Shale. This consists of laminated gray and black shales and mudstones, some times so thin they are only a few millimeters thick. Sections of the Hanover are bioturbated. There are a few pyritized burrows and structures. The upper Kellwasser bed is also found in this unit. This bed is marked with a fissile hard black shale. Fossils are far from numerous, in the upper parts but are common in the lower sections of the Hanover. They include ostracodes, gastropods, bivalves, goniatites, and some small rugose corals.

The Wiscoy Sandstone (Hartnagel, 1912) generally correlates with the Hanover Shale to the west. It is made up of interbedded sandstone and shale. Studies indicate that the sand sections are not channel sands but more likely sand lobes of a submarine fan structure, transported from the east.

The Pipe Creek shale is a very hard black organic shale. It contains the Lower Kellwasser Bed, a marked mass extinction event of the Devonian.
