= Genesee Formation =

Devonian geologic unit in the Appalachian basin

Genesee Formation (Group)
- Stratigraphic range: Frasnian
- Type: Formation
- Unit of: Frasnian
- Sub-units: West River Shale Member; Genundewa Limestone Member; Ithaca Member; Renwick Shale Member; Sherburne Flagstone Member; Penn Yan Formation; Geneseo Shale
- Underlies: Sonyea Group
- Overlies: Tully Limestone
- Thickness: 9' to 900' generally thinning westward.

Lithology
- Primary: Shale
- Other: Black Shale, Siltstone and Limestone

Location
- Region: New York, Pennsylvania, West Virginia
- Country: United States

Type section
- Named for: Genesee, NY
- Named by: de Witt and Colton, 1959, p. 2815

The Genesee Formation (Group) is a geologic formation in New York. It is equivalent the Harrell Shale in Pennsylvania. It dates back to the Upper Devonian period. It is the basal unit of the Frasnian and Upper Devonian period. The Genesee Formation was defined by de Witt and Colton, 1959 as all strata between the Middlesex Unit of the Sonyea Group and the Tully Formation, where present or the Moscow Formation where the Tully is not present.

== Description ==
The Genesee includes several members. Moving westward towards the Findley and Cincinnati Archs the formation thins to less than 9 feet. To the east it feathers in with coarser grained formations.

== Stratigraphy ==
The Genesee has several members. With coarser clastic material coming mostly from the east there are several members that are feathered to the West River and Penn Yann on the eastern flanks.

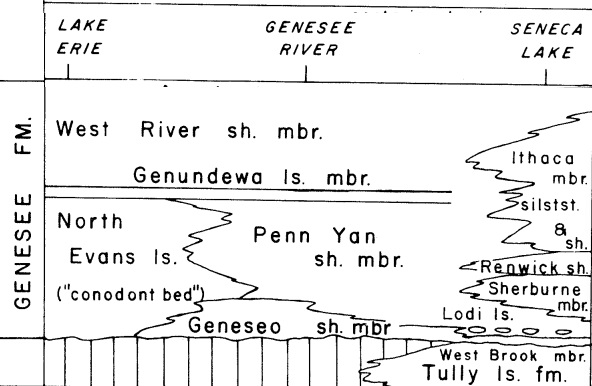
General Stratigraphic Column of Genesee Formation in NY State.

Below are listed the units found within the Genesee.

=== West River Shale Member ===
Clarke and Luther (1904, p. 28) coined the name for the West River. Later, de Witt and Colton, 1959, assigned it to the Genesee formation. The West River is one of the most expansive members of the Genesee making it as far south as West Virginia.

The West River is composed chiefly of shale and mudrocks. The color is usually medium to dark gray. As with most members the grain size increases moving eastward, making the formation silty in the east. Thin beds may be grey black and contain some iron staining.

=== Genundewa Limestone Member ===
The Genundewa is a 12' - 15' limestone bed found at the base of the West River Shale. Originally defined by Clarke (1903), this unit was reevaluated by de Witt and Colton, 1959 and defined at just the singular bed. Other limestone noted previously was found to be micro-concretions with in the Penn Yan.

The Genundewa's lithology is made up of calcareous shale and mud supported limestones. Some beds are made up of a large number up to 70% shells from Styliolina fissurella. The color tends to be darker, grey black to brownish black.

=== Renwick Shale Member ===
The Renwick was originally designated as a member of the Middlesex Formation by Caster (1933, p. 202). Later de Witt and Colton, 1959 were able to demonstrate that it was not part of the Sonyea and Middlesex, but in the Genesee.

=== Sherburne Flagstone Member ===
The name Sherburne was first coined by Vanuxem (1840, p. 381). The unit was defined by de Witt and Colton, 1959. The Sherburne occupies a much narrower footprint east/west then the three larger formations.

The Sherburne has finer clastic material to the west and coarser material to the east. Ranging from clay sized particles forming shales, to fine-grained sand. The bedding is thin to massive. Most bedding is 1 to 12 inches though some areas it can reach 15'

=== Penn Yan Formation ===
The Penn Yan was defined by de Witt and Colton, 1959. Previously it was defined by Grossman (1944, p. 64) as a tongue of the West River Shale. In their publication de Witt and Colton demonstrated that in addition to the Genundewa Limestone, there were several other members separating the Penn Yan from the West River. The Lodi Limestone is located near the base on the Penn Yan near the eastern extent of the unit.

The Penn Yan is predominantly shale. Localized beds and lenses of siltstone can be found in the formation, becoming more frequent and coarser moving eastward. Concretions of lime material can also be found within the unit. The color is light to dark grey. It may be tinted olive to greenish.

==== Fossils ====
- Orbiculoidea lodiensis
- Reticularia laevis
- Ponticeras perlatum

=== Geneseo Shale ===
Geneseo was originally proposed by Chadwick (1920, p. 118) and was defined as all of the "black" shale separating the Genudewan Limestone member and the Moscow Formation. Later the Geneseo was restricted to the lower two brownish black shale beds. Kirchgasser (1975, p. 62) and L. V. Rickard (oral communication., 1974) proposed that only the lower of the two brownish black beds was the Geneseo and the upper bed belongs to the Penn Yan.

The Geneseo tends to be blackish in color. It may also have a brownish, olive, or grayish tint to it as well. Formation that is unexposed to the elements is massive and shows some laminations. When weathered it becomes fissile. Pyrite and Calcite are found either in nodules or as fill in natural fractures. Due to its organic nature it is a source rock for Hydrocarbons, mostly Natural gas.

==== Fossils ====
Due to the anoxic environment necessary for the development of black shales, fossils are rare. The upper beds of the Geneseo do contain some scattered fossils of thin shelled organisms. Predominantly the brachiopod Orbiculoidea lodiensis.
