= Rhinestreet Formation =

Geologic formation in the United States

- Stratigraphic range: Late Devonian; Frasnian; ~380–381 Ma
- Type: Formation
- Unit of: West Falls Group
- Sub-units: Belpre Ash Bed
- Underlies: Angola Formation
- Overlies: Cashaqua Shale

Lithology
- Primary: Black Shale
- Other: Shale, Oil Shale

Location
- Region: New York, Ohio, Pennsylvania
- Country: United States, Canada

Type section
- Named for: Exposures along Rhinestreet north from Naples, Ontario Co., NY.
- Named by: Clarke (1903)

The Rhinestreet Shale is a geologic formation in the Appalachian Basin. It dates back to the Devonian period. The Rhinestreet is an organic or Black Shale found on from the approximately the middle of the Appalachian Basin. Near the Middle of Ohio and Kentucky it reaches the surface on the flank of Cincinnati and Findlay Arches.

== Description ==
The Rhinestreet is composed primarily of black shale because of its organic content. Upwards of 85% of the total formation is made up of black shale. There are thin beds of non-organic gray shale as well as limestone concretions interbedded throughout the formation. Duning the Alleghanian orogeny regional uplifting caused the first set of fracturing. Later during rapid burial from sedimentation the next set of fractures were caused by natural hydraulic-fracturing.
