= West Falls Group =

Geologic group in the Appalachian Basin, U.S.

- Stratigraphic range: Frasnian
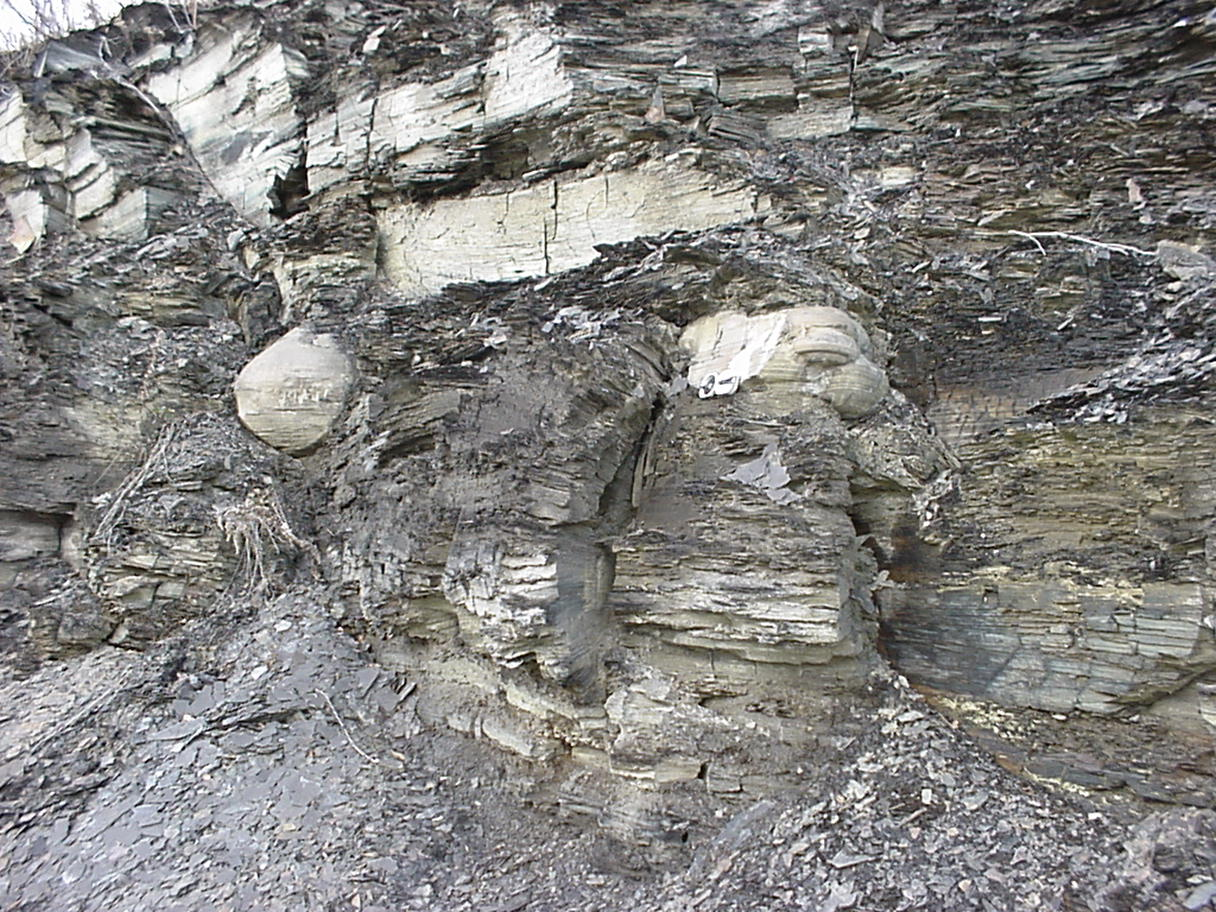
- Fractured concretions in Rhinestreet Shale Formation of West Falls Group
- Type: Geologic Group
- Sub-units: Angola Shale (NY); Nunda Sandstone (NY, PA); West Hill Formation (NY); Gardeau Formation (NY, PA); Grimes Siltstone (NY); Rhinestreet Formation (NY, PA); Walton Formation (NY); Moreland Shale (NY); Millport Shale (NY); Beers Hill Formation (NY); Slide Mountain Formation (NY); Honesdale Formation (NY)
- Underlies: Java Formation
- Overlies: Sonyea Group

Lithology
- Primary: Shale
- Other: Black shale

Location
- Region: Appalachian Basin
- Country: United States
- Extent: Kentucky, New York, Ohio, Pennsylvania, Tennessee, Virginia, West Virginia

Type section
- Named for: West Falls, New York
- Named by: J. Pepper, W. De Witt, and G.W. Colton in 1956

The West Falls Group is a geologic group in the Appalachian Basin. It dates back to the Devonian period. Also stratigraphically equivalent to the Portage Group.

== Description ==
=== Stratigraphy ===
The West Falls Group is a geologic group in New York. It dates back to the Devonian period. Also stratigraphically equivalent to the Portage Group.

The West Falls formation is bounded above by the Java Group and below by the Sonyea Formation. It comprises the Angola Shale and Rhinestreet Shale Members. It was deposited during the Acadian Orogeny and is part of the Salina thrust sheet.

Also known as the West Falls Formation in New York.

=== Geographic distribution ===
The West Falls is recognized in the subsurface from western New York to eastern Tennessee.

=== Lithology ===
The predominant lithology of the West Falls Group is shale. The Rhinestreet Member can be further subdivided into two shale types: a thick, fissile black shale underlies a gray to greenish-gray shale that likely indicates a transitional environment. The Angola member is a gray to greenish-gray shale, easily distinguished by its consistent low gamma ray signature, which is typical of this shale type.

=== Paleontology ===
The West Falls Formation was deposited during the Frasnian stage of the Upper Devonian. Two distinct community types are observed in the group: "a shallower water spiriferacean-rhynchonellide-bivalve species ensemble, and a deeper water assemblage of unattached epibenthic and sessile semi-infaunal brachiopods" (Sutton, McGee).

=== Economic significance ===
Both members of the West Falls Formation have been assessed for oil and gas exploration. The USGS has determined that the average total organic carbon (TOC) in the Rhinestreet Shale is 0.89%; the TOC in the Angola Shale is 1.47%.

The Rathbone shale field in Rathbone, Steuben County, New York was discovered in 1931. 31 wells were drilled in this field, targeting the Angola and Rhinestreet members. Of these, 24 produced natural gas, 4 were dry holes, 2 were plugged and abandoned, and one produced oil. The wells were typically 900 to 1,500 feet (270 to 460 m) in depth, reservoir pressure was 225 pounds per square inch (1,550 kilopascals) and flow rates ranged from 100 to 2,000 thousand cubic feet (2,800 to 56,600 m^{3}) per day.
