= Tully Formation =

Geologic Unit found in the Appalachian Basin

- Stratigraphic range: Devonian
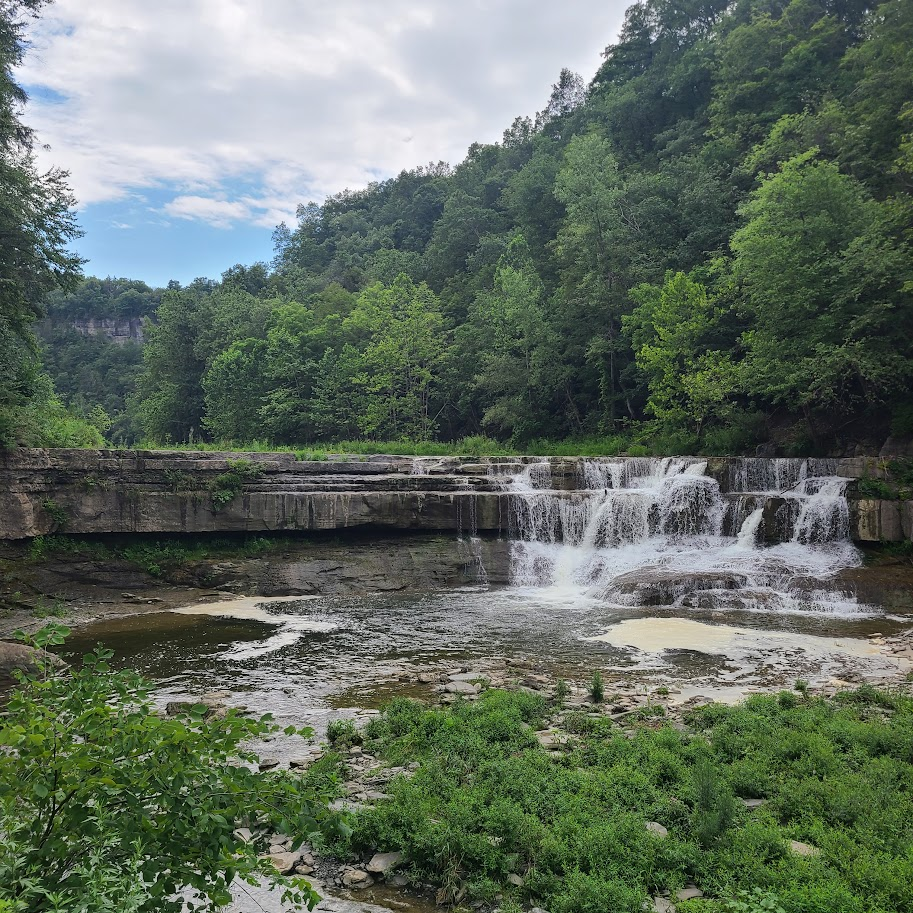
- Tully Formation at Taughannock Falls State Park
- Type: Formation
- Sub-units: New York: New Lisbon Member; Laurens Member; West Brook Member; Pennsylvania: Weissport Member; Brodhead Creek Member; Lehighton Member
- Underlies: Harrell Shale/Genesee Group
- Overlies: Hamilton Group

Lithology
- Primary: Limestone
- Other: Shale, Siltstone, and Sandstone

Location
- Region: Maryland, New York, Pennsylvania, West Virginia
- Country: United States

Type section
- Named for: Tully, NY
- Named by: Vanuxem (1839)

The Tully Formation is a geologic unit in the Appalachian Basin. The Tully was deposited as a carbonate rich mud, in a shallow sea at the end of the Middle Devonian. Outcrops for the Tully are found in New York State and Pennsylvania. It is also found subsurface in western Maryland and northern West Virginia. A number of fossil remains from marine organisms may be found in Tully outcrops.

== Description ==
The Tully is primary made up of limestone. There there are also layers with much higher clay contend resulting in a calcareous shale. To the east the Tully becomes siliciclastic. This is due to sediments being washed in from the Acadian Mountains to the east. By the time the Tully was being deposited the Appalachian Basin had been nearly filled in that the Tully was deposited on a broad planform of rock. The Tully ranges in thickness to less than 1' in western New York to 70'+ thick in central Pennsylvania and 90'+ thick in southwestern Pennsylvania and northern West Virginia.

== Fossils ==
=== Brachiopods ===
Tullypothyridina, Camarotoechia, Mesocostale, Rhyssochonetes, Emanuella, Pseudoatrypa, Spinatrypa, Tylothyris, Mucrospirifer tulliensis, Cyrtina, Echinocoelia, Strophodonta
