= Conneaut Group =

Geologic group in Virginia, US

- Stratigraphic range: Devonian
- Type: Group

Location
- Region: Virginia
- Country: United States

The Conneaut Group is a geologic group in Virginia. It preserves fossils dating back to the Devonian period.

== See also ==
- List of fossiliferous stratigraphic units in Virginia
- Paleontology in Virginia
