= Schoharie Formation =

Geologic formation in the United States

- Stratigraphic range: Devonian
- Type: Formation
- Sub-units: Leeds Mbr; Carlisle Center Mbr
- Underlies: Onondaga Limestone
- Overlies: Esopus Formation

Lithology
- Primary: Siltstone, sandstone
- Other: Limestone

Location
- Region: New York, Pennsylvania, Virginia
- Country: United States

Type section
- Named for: Schoharie, NY

The Schoharie Formation is a Devonian formation found in outcrop in New York, New Jersey, Pennsylvania, and Virginia. Also known as the "Schoharie Grit" in central New York, due to the "gritty" consistency of the formation. The "grit" is describing the silt and sand that is interbedded in the formation

== Description ==
The Schoharie is made up of finer grained siliciclastics and calcareous material, with the formation becoming less calcareous towards the top.

== Stratigraphy ==
The upper section is known as the Leeds Member. It is composed of calcareous mudstones and siltstones which become cherty and more argillaceous moving upwards. Below is the Carlisle Center Member and it consists of laminated and flaggy calcareous mudstones or siltstones. Fossils are more common in the upper Leeds Member. The Schoharie lies comfortably over the Esopus. The boundary between the Schoharie and the Onondaga is gradational.

== Fossils ==
Brachiopods:

Atrypaimpressa (Hall)

Chonetes hemisphericus (Hall)

Elytha fimbriata (Conrad)

Leptaena rhomboidalis (Wilckens)

Spirifer macrus (Hall), T

Trilobite: Synphoria anchiops (Hall)
