= Canadaway Group =

Geologic group in Pennsylvania, US

- Stratigraphic range: Devonian
- Type: Group

Location
- Region: Pennsylvania
- Country: United States

The Canadaway Group is a geologic group in Pennsylvania. It preserves fossils dating back to the Devonian period.

== See also ==
- List of fossiliferous stratigraphic units in Pennsylvania
- Paleontology in Pennsylvania
