= List of fossiliferous stratigraphic units in Pennsylvania =

This article contains a list of fossil-bearing stratigraphic units in the state of Pennsylvania, U.S.

== Sites ==
Group or Formation	Period	Notes
Allegheny Formation	Carboniferous	
Ames Formation	Carboniferous	
Anthracite Formation	Carboniferous	
Antietam Formation	Cambrian	
Bellefonte Formation	Ordovician	
Bloomsburg Formation	Silurian	
Canadaway Group/Canaseraga Formation	Devonian	
Canadaway Group/Cuba Formation	Devonian	
Canadaway Group/Java Formation	Devonian	
Canadaway Group/Machias Formation	Devonian	
Canadaway Group/Rushford Formation	Devonian	
Catskill Formation	Devonian	
Chatham Group/Hammer Creek Formation	Triassic	
Chemung Formation	Devonian	
Cherry Ridge Shale	Devonian	
Conemaugh Group	Carboniferous	
Conemaugh Group/Conemaugh Formation	Carboniferous	
Conemaugh Group/Glenshaw Formation	Carboniferous	
Conewango Group	Devonian	
Conewango Group/Pocono Formation	Devonian	
Conewango Group/Venango Formation	Devonian	
Conneaut Group/Cuba silt shale (Chadakoin)	Devonian	
Conemaugh Group	Carboniferous	
Conemaugh Group/Duquesne Coal	Carboniferous	
Cussewago Formation	Devonian	
Dunkard Group/Greene Formation	Permian	
Dunkard Group/Waynesburg Formation	Permian	
Gatesburg Formation	Cambrian	
Genesee Group/Ithaca Formation	Devonian	
Gettysburg Formation	Triassic	
Glenshaw Formation	Carboniferous	
Hamilton Group/Mahantango Formation	Devonian	
Hamilton Group/Marcellus Shale	Devonian	
Harrell Formation	Devonian	
Helderberg Formation	Devonian	
Jennings Formation	Devonian	
Keyser Limestone	Silurian	
Kinzers Formation	Cambrian	
Llewellyn Formation	Carboniferous	
Lock Haven Formation	Devonian	
Lockatong Formation	Triassic	
Pocono Formation	Devonian	
Mahantango Formation	Devonian	
Manlius Limestone	Devonian	
Martinsburg Formation	Ordovician	
Mauch Chunk Formation	Carboniferous	
Mercer Formation	Carboniferous	
Mifflintown Formation	Silurian	
Monongahela Group/Pittsburgh Formation	Carboniferous	
New Oxford Formation	Triassic	
Newark Group/Gettysburg Formation	Triassic	
Newark Group/Lockatong Formation	Triassic	
Newark Group/New Oxford Formation	Triassic	
Nittany Dolomite	Ordovician	
Old Point Formation	Devonian	
Onondaga Formation	Devonian	
Oswayo Sandstone	Devonian	
Passaic Formation	Triassic	
Pleasant Hill Limestone	Cambrian	
Pocono Formation	Carboniferous, Devonian	
Pottsville Formation	Carboniferous	
Reedsville Group/ Martinsburg Formation	Ordovician	
Rockdale Run Formation	Ordovician	
Rose Hill Formation	Silurian	
Shawangunk Formation	Silurian	
Sonyea Group/Delaware River Formation	Devonian	
Stockton Formation	Triassic	
Stonehenge Formation	Ordovician	
Susquehanna Group/Chemung Formation	Devonian	
Titusville Till		
Tomstown Dolomite	Cambrian	
Venango Formation	Devonian	
Vintage Dolomite	Cambrian	
Warrior Formation	Cambrian	
Washington Formation	Permian	

== See also ==
- Paleontology in Pennsylvania
