= List of fossiliferous stratigraphic units in Maryland =

This article contains a list of fossil-bearing stratigraphic units in the state of Maryland, U.S.

== Sites ==
Group or Formation	Period	Notes
Allegheny Formation	Carboniferous	
Antietam Formation	Cambrian	
Aquia Formation	Paleogene	
Brightseat Formation	Paleogene	
Calvert Formation	Neogene	
Chatham Group/Gettysburg Formation	Triassic	
Chemung Formation	Devonian	
Chesapeake Group/Calvert Formation	Neogene	
Chesapeake/Choptank Formation	Neogene	
Chesapeake/St. Marys Formation	Neogene	
Clinton Group/Keefer Sandstone	Silurian	
Clinton/Rochester Shale	Silurian	
Clinton/Rose Hill Formation	Silurian	
Conemaugh Group	Carboniferous	
Dunkard Group/Greene Formation	Permian	
Foreknobs Formation	Devonian	
Greenland Gap Group/Foreknobs Formation	Devonian	
Jennings Formation	Devonian	
Aquia Formation	Paleogene	
Magothy Formation	Cretaceous	
Marcellus Formation	Devonian	
Matawan Formation	Cretaceous	
McKenzie Formation	Silurian	
Merchantville Formation	Cretaceous	
Mifflintown Formation	Silurian	
Monmouth Formation	Cretaceous	
Nanjemoy Formation	Paleogene	
Onondaga Formation	Devonian	
Pamlico Formation	Neogene	
Pamunkey Group/Aquia Formation	Paleogene	
Pamunkey/Brightseat Formation	Paleogene	
Pamunkey/Nanjemoy Formation	Paleogene	
Arundel Clay	Cretaceous	
Patapsco Formation	Cretaceous	
Patuxent Formation	Cretaceous	
Rockdale Run Formation	Ordovician	
Romney Formation	Devonian	
Severn Formation	Cretaceous	
St. Marys Formation	Neogene	
Stonehenge Limestone	Ordovician	
Talbot Formation	Neogene	
Tonoloway Limestone	Silurian	
Williamsport Sandstone	Silurian	
Wills Creek Limestone	Silurian	

== See also ==
- Paleontology in Maryland
