= Megamolgophis =

Megamolgophis Temporal range: 305–290 Ma

Scientific classification
- Domain: Eukaryota
- Kingdom: Animalia
- Phylum: Chordata
- Order: †Lysorophia
- Genus: †Megamolgophis; Romer, 1952

Type species
- Megamolgophis agostini Romer, 1952

Extinct genus of tetrapods

Megamolgophis is an extinct genus of eel-like tetrapod, possibly belonging to the group Lysorophia. Fossils from this genus have been found in the Allegheny mountains of the eastern United States. The genus is endemic to geological formations of this area, such as the Greene and Washington formations of the Early Permian Dunkard Group, as well as the Pennsylvanian (Late Carboniferous) Conemaugh Group.

If correctly assigned to Lysorophia, members of Megamolgophis would not only be the largest known lysorophians, but also some of the largest lepospondyls in general. In 1952, Alfred Romer suggested that the holotype may have been 1.3 meters (four feet) in length, similar to the length of an average black snake. However, based on the length of the specimen's ribs, Romer also considered it likely that it was much wider and therefore much heavier in life than a black snake, instead being proportionally similar to an eastern diamondback rattlesnake. It is uncertain whether this genus legitimately belongs to Lysorophia, as referred skull material shows notable differences with lysorophian skulls.
