= Kinzers Formation =

Geological formation in Pennsylvania

- Stratigraphic range: Cambrian Stage 4
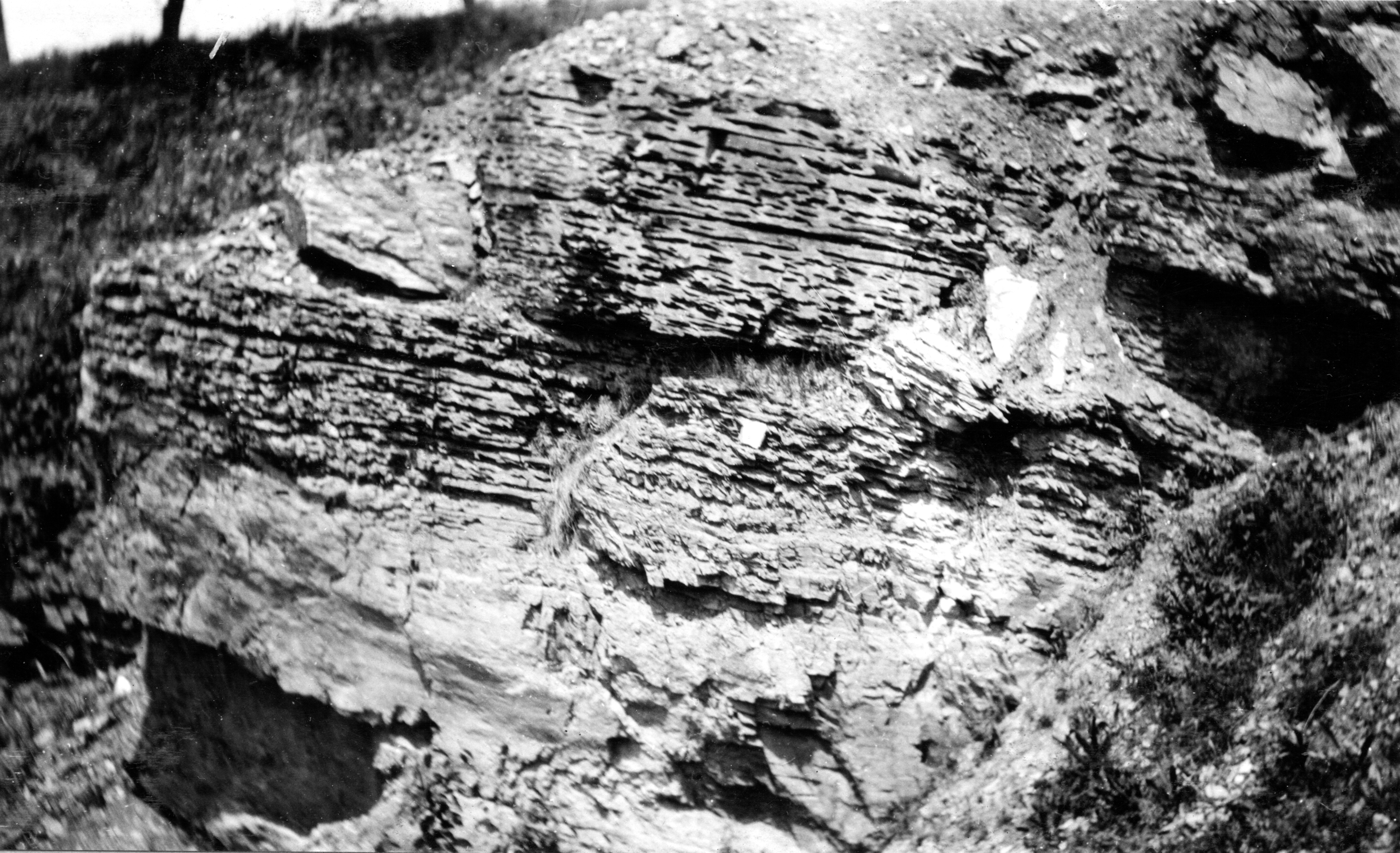
- Reticulately weathered argillaceous-banded limestone of upper member of Kinzers Formation. USGS photo.
- Type: Sedimentary
- Sub-units: Emigsville Mb., York Mb., Greenmount Mb.
- Underlies: Ledger Formation
- Overlies: Vintage Dolomite

Lithology
- Primary: Limestone
- Other: Shale, marble

Location
- Region: Mid-Atlantic United States
- Country: United States
- Extent: Pennsylvania, Maryland, Virginia

Type section
- Named for: Kinzers, Pennsylvania
- Named by: Stose, G.W., and Jonas, A.I.

The Kinzers Formation is a geologic formation in Pennsylvania. It preserves fossils dating back to the fourth stage of the Cambrian Period.

The base of the Kinzers Formation is primarily a dark-brown shale. The middle is a gray and white spotted limestone and, locally, marble having irregular partings. The top is a sandy limestone which weathers to a fine-grained, friable, porous, sandy mass. Wilshusen formally divided the Kinzers into three members along these lines in his 1979 map of York, Pennsylvania. The members are called the Earthy Buff Limestone Member, Pure Limestone Member, and Shale Member.

== Type section ==
Named from exposures at a railroad cut at Kinzers, Lancaster County, Pennsylvania.

== Other outcrops ==
The Kinzers overlies the Vintage Dolomite at the type section of the Vintage at a railroad cut at Vintage, Pennsylvania.

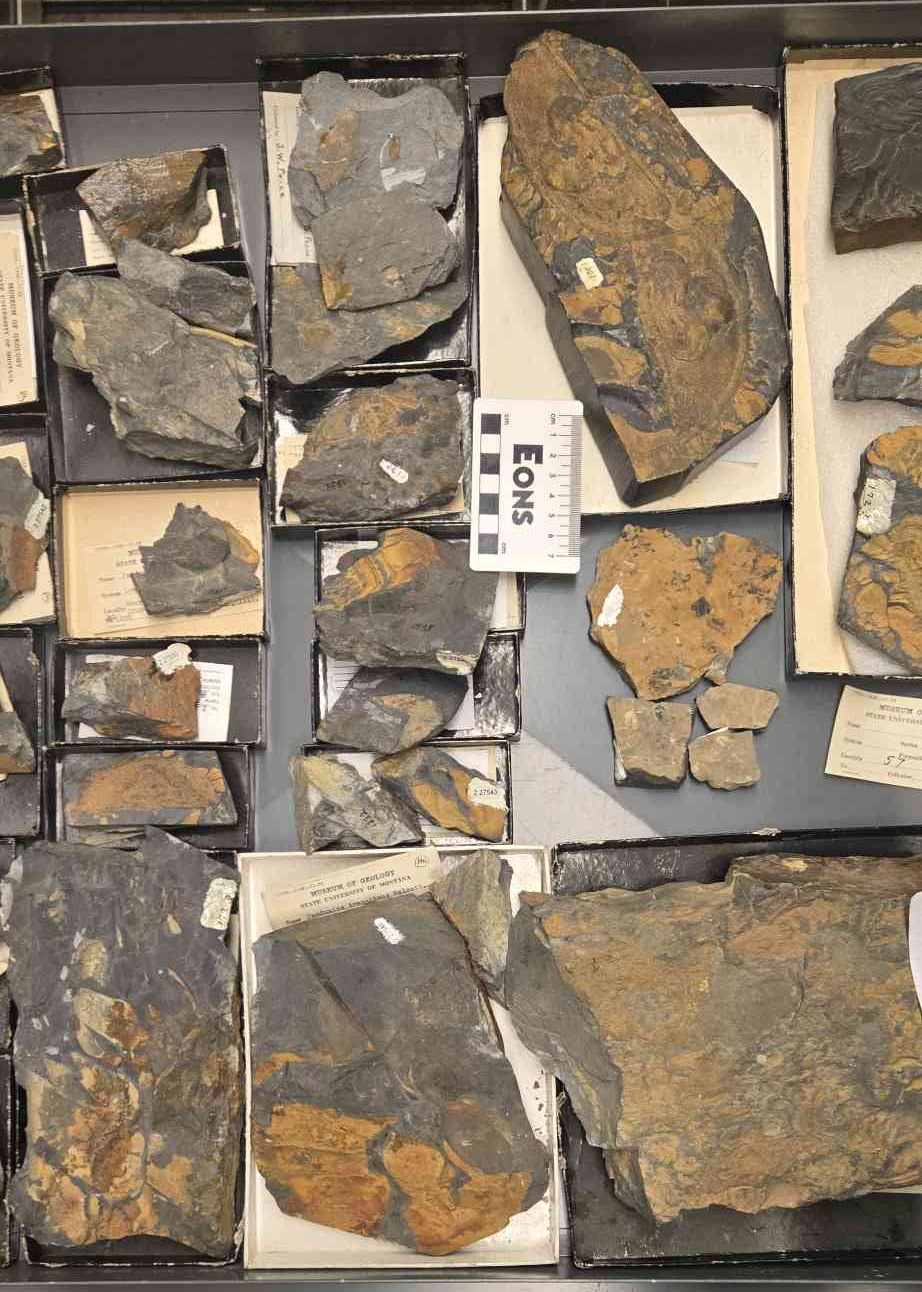
A shelf at the University of Montana Paleontology Center containing various fossils from the Kinzers Formation.

High quality fossil specimens (Lagerstätte) were obtained from the Noah Getz Quarry, one mile north of Rohrerstown, Pennsylvania, but the quarry location is overgrown and disturbed by development. The fossils are from the Emigsville Member, and include the trilobite Olenellus thompsoni, the radiodont Lenisicaris pennsylvanica, the hymenocarine arthropod Tuzoia getzi, the edrioasteroid echinoderm Yorkicystis haefneri, and the hemichordate nest Margaretia dorus. The Kinzers Formation is also notable for preserving one of the most diverse radiodont faunas of the Cambrian period, with at least ten species known, including members of the tamisiocarididae, anomalocarididae, and amplectobeluidae families.

The sponge Hazelia walcotti has also been found in the Kinzers. It is one of few sponges known from the Cambrian period of North America.

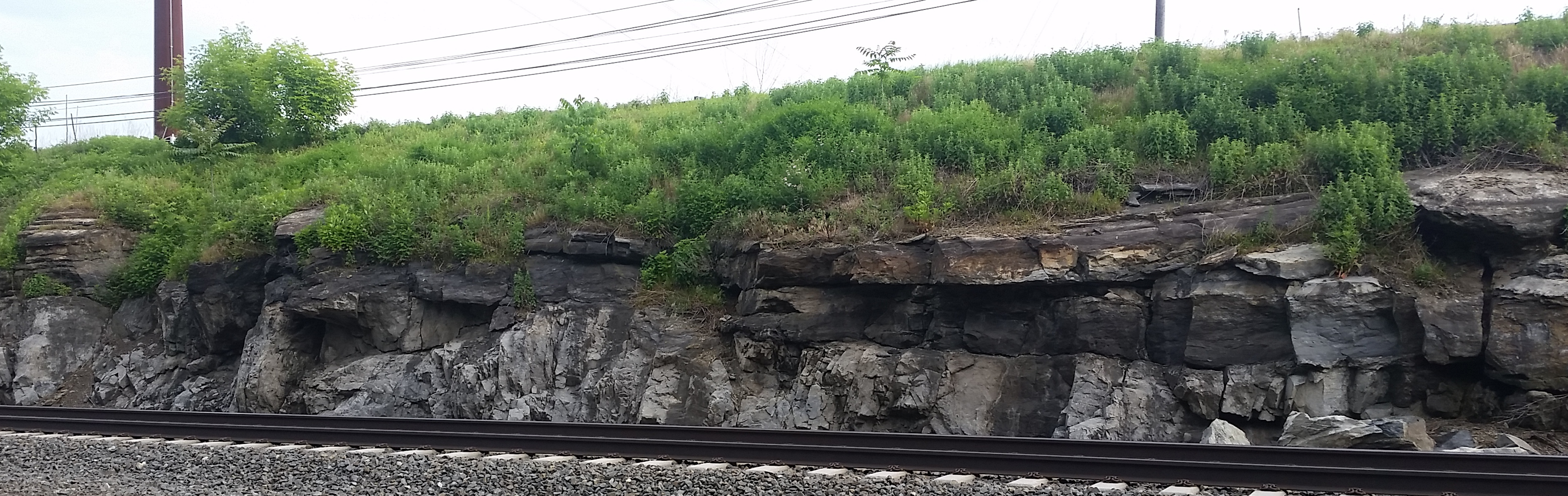
The section at Vintage in 2019. The Kinzers is the darker, layered rock above the lighter Vintage.

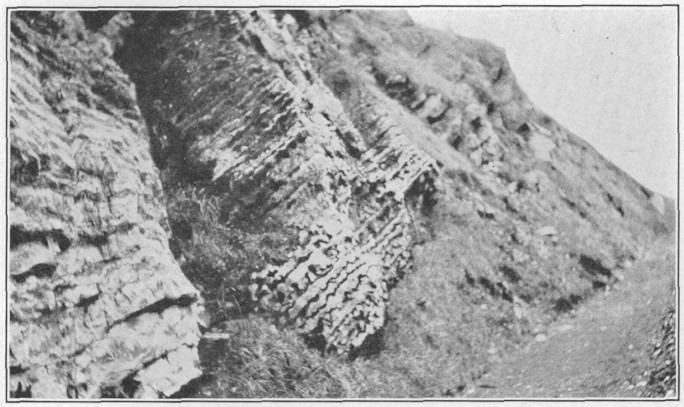
Another view of the type section.

== See also ==
- List of fossiliferous stratigraphic units in Pennsylvania
- Paleontology in Pennsylvania
