= Conestoga Formation =

Geologic formation in Pennsylvania

- Stratigraphic range: Middle Cambrian to Early Ordovician
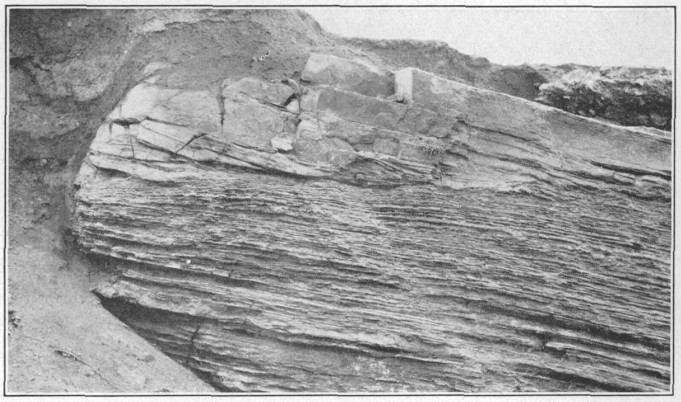
- Thick-bedded crystalline limestone passing into finely laminated slaty limestone typical of the Conestoga, in quarry 1 mile northwest of Bellemont.
- Type: sedimentary, metamorphic
- Overlies: Vintage Dolomite

Lithology
- Primary: limestone
- Other: phyllite, conglomerate

Location
- Region: Pennsylvania
- Country: United States

Type section
- Named by: Knopf and Jonas (1923)

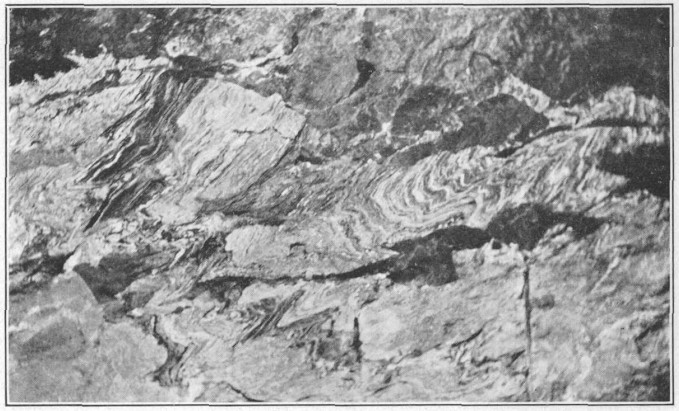
Folded micaceous marble of Conestoga Formation, in a quarry a half-mile northwest of Quarryville

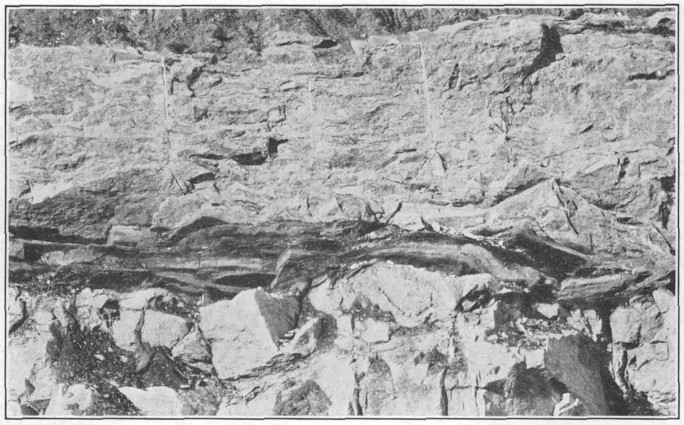
Basal Conestoga (slate and limestone conglomerate), unconformably overlying Vintage Dolomite, Bellemont Quarry

The Conestoga Formation is a geologic formation in Pennsylvania.

== Description ==
Light-gray, thin-bedded, impure, contorted limestone having shale partings; conglomeratic at base; in Chester Valley, includes micaceous limestone in upper part, phyllite in middle, and alternating dolomite and limestone in lower part.

== Type section ==
Named from outcrops along Conestoga River, Lancaster County, Pennsylvania.
