= Ames Limestone =

Geologic formation in the United States

- Stratigraphic range: Carboniferous; ~303.7 Ma
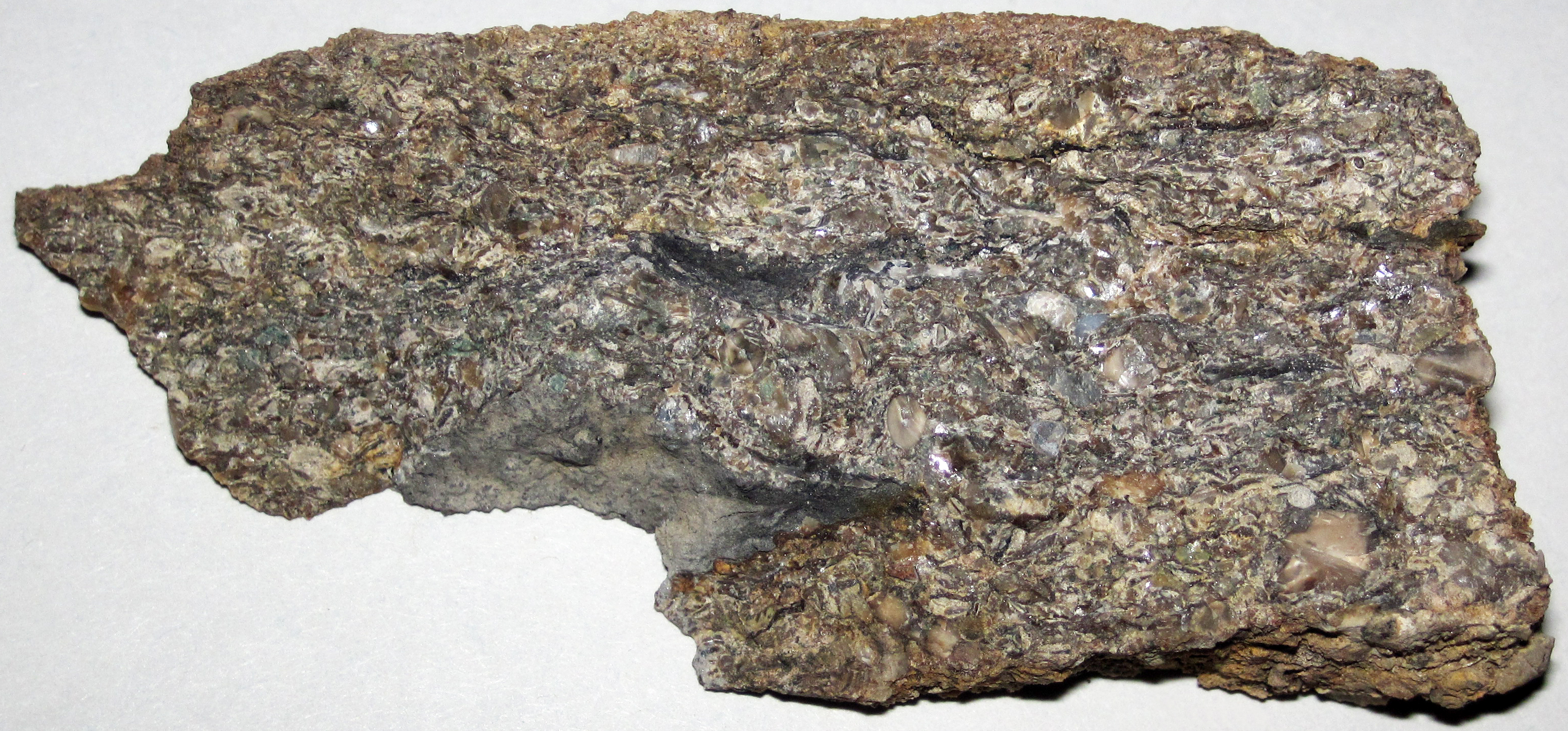
- Fossiliferous Ames Limestone (Morgan County, Ohio)
- Type: Member
- Unit of: Conewango Group
- Sub-units: None
- Thickness: 1 - 4'

Lithology
- Primary: Limestone

Location
- Region: Ohio, Pennsylvania, West Virginia
- Country: United States

Type section
- Named for: Amesville, Ohio

The Ames Limestone is a geologic member in Ohio, Kentucky, Pennsylvania and West Virginia. It is part of the Conemaugh Group. Formerly known as "Crinoidal Limestone" and "Green Fossiliferous Lime", it was renamed to Ames.

Fossils of Echinoderm, Brachiopod, and Gastropoda are commonly found in the Ames.

== Description ==
The Ames is a thin Marker bed of Limestone and/or Fossiliferous limestone. It marks a transition from a predominantly marine environment to predominantly alluvial environment. The Ames serves as a marker for the boundary for the Casselman Formation and the Glenshaw Formation.
