= Casselman Formation =

Geological formation in the United States

- Stratigraphic range: Pennsylvanian
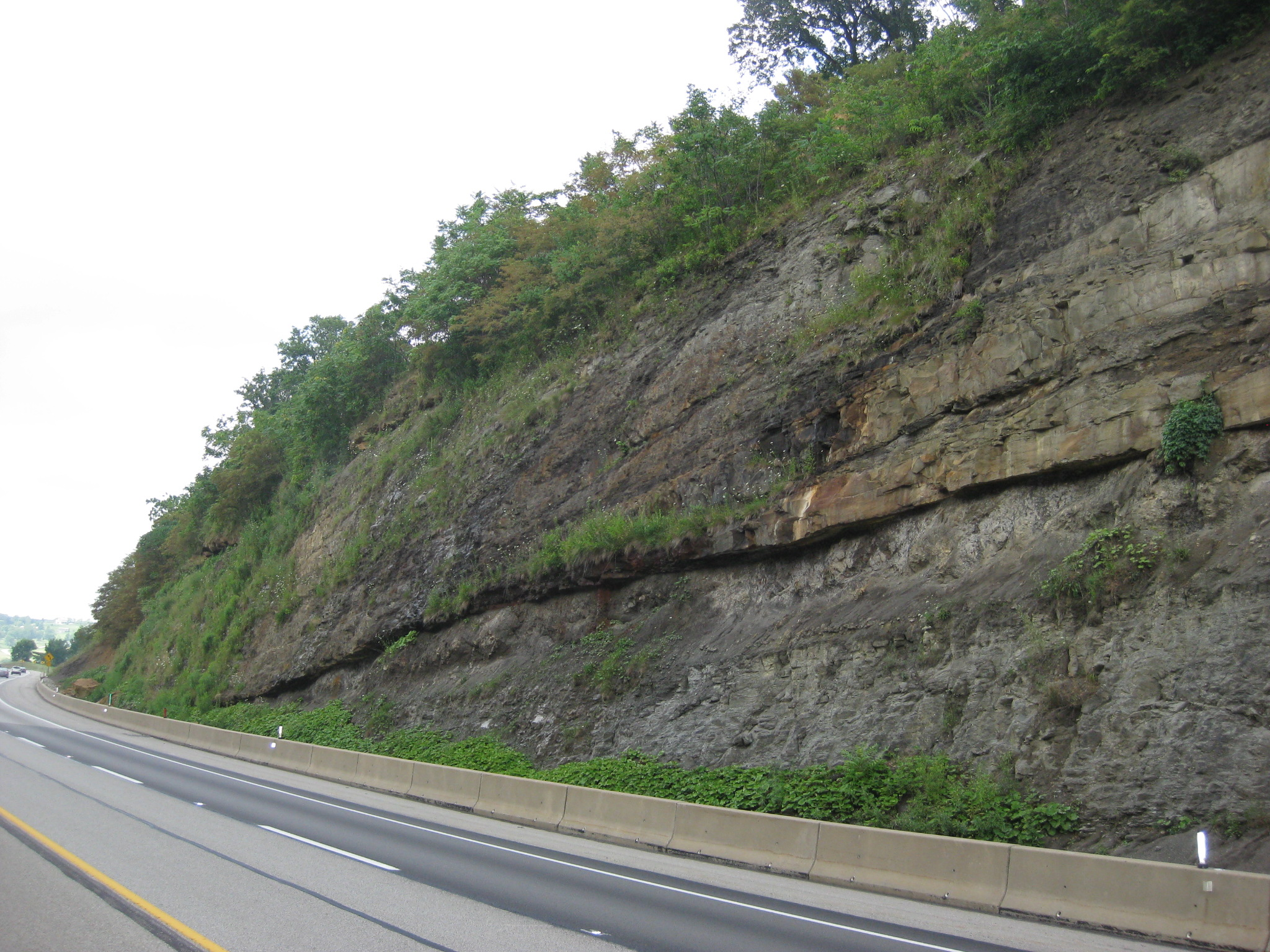
- Outcrop of Casselman Formation at Mile Marker 84.2, Pennsylvania Turnpike
- Type: sedimentary
- Unit of: Conemaugh Group
- Underlies: Monongahela Group
- Overlies: Glenshaw Formation

Lithology
- Primary: shale, siltstone, sandstone, red beds, coal
- Other: limestone

Location
- Region: Appalachian Plateau
- Country: United States
- Extent: Ohio, Pennsylvania, Maryland, West Virginia

Type section
- Named for: Casselman River
- Named by: N. K. Flint, 1965

The Casselman Formation mapped sedimentary bedrock unit in Pennsylvania, Maryland, and West Virginia, of Pennsylvanian age. It is the uppermost of two formations in the Conemaugh Group, the lower being the Glenshaw Formation. The boundary between these two units is the top of the marine Ames Limestone. The Conemaugh Group overlies the Upper Freeport coal bed of the Allegheny Formation and underlies the Pittsburgh coal seam of the Monongahela Group.

== Overview ==
The Conemaugh Group consists of cyclic sequences of shale, siltstone, sandstone, red beds, thin impure limestone, and thin nonpersistent coal. Red beds are associated with landslides.

The thickness of the Conemaugh Group averages about 400 feet in Ohio, and it ranges from 450 feet on the Ohio River in West Virginia to 520 feet in Washington County, Pennsylvania, and then to 890 feet in Somerset County, Pennsylvania.

Fedexia remains are among the fossils that have been recovered from the formation.
