= Venango =

Venango may refer to:

== Places in the United States ==
- Venango, Kansas, an unincorporated community
- Venango, Nebraska, a village
- Venango County, Pennsylvania
- Venango, Pennsylvania, a borough
- Venango Township, Butler County, Pennsylvania
- Venango Township, Crawford County, Pennsylvania
- Venango Township, Erie County, Pennsylvania
- Fort Venango, Pennsylvania, a British fort from 1760 to 1763

== Other uses ==
- USS Venango (AKA-82), a US Navy attack cargo ship
- Venango Regional Airport, Venango County, Pennsylvania, a public airport
- Venango Catholic High School, a private, Roman Catholic high school in Oil City, Pennsylvania

== See also ==
- Venango Formation, a geologic formation in Pennsylvania
- Venango Path, a Native American path in Pennsylvania
