= Conewango Group =

Geologic group in Pennsylvania, US

- Stratigraphic range: Carboniferous; ~Kasimovian-Gzhelian; ~307–301 Ma
- Type: Group
- Sub-units: Casselman Formation, Glenshaw Formation
- Underlies: Monongahela Group
- Overlies: Allegheny Group

Lithology
- Primary: Shale and Clay
- Other: Coal, Limestone, Red Shale, Sandstone

Location
- Region: Maryland, Ohio, Pennsylvania and West Virginia
- Country: United States

The Conewango Group is a Carboniferous aged geologic group in Western and south central Pennsylvania. It consists of two formations the younger Casselman Formation and the older Glenshaw Formation. Stratigraphic work in this geologic group identified several different Upper Devonian faunas. Rock types in the Conewango Group include shale, siltstone, and sandstone.
