= Delaware River Formation =

- Stratigraphic range: Devonian
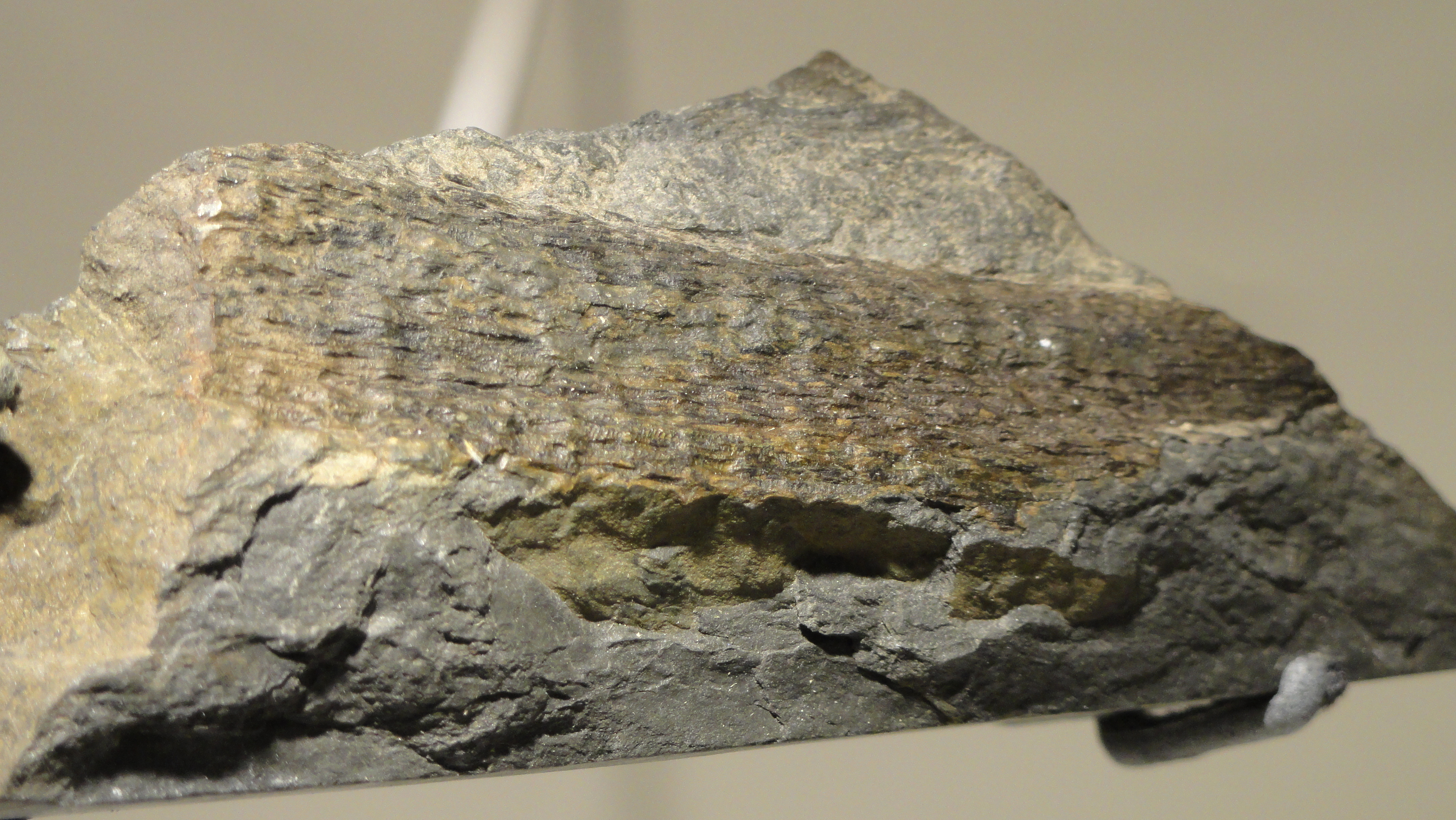
- Colpodexylon deatsii, bark impression, Delaware River Formation, New York
- Type: Formation

Location
- Region: Pennsylvania, New York
- Country: United States

The Delaware River Formation is a geologic formation in Pennsylvania and New York (state). It preserves fossils dating back to the Devonian period.

== See also ==
- List of fossiliferous stratigraphic units in Pennsylvania
- Paleontology in Pennsylvania
