= Mercer Formation =

Geologic formation in Pennsylvania, United States

- Stratigraphic range: Carboniferous
- Type: Formation

Location
- Region: Pennsylvania
- Country: United States

The Mercer Formation is a geologic formation in Pennsylvania. It preserves fossils dating back to the Carboniferous period.

== See also ==
- List of fossiliferous stratigraphic units in Pennsylvania
- Paleontology in Pennsylvania
