= Titusville Till =

Geologic formation in Pennsylvania, United States

- Stratigraphic range: Neogene
- Type: Formation

Location
- Region: Pennsylvania
- Country: United States

The Titusville Till is a geologic formation in Pennsylvania. It is a till deposit preserving fossils dating back to the Neogene period.

== See also ==
- List of fossiliferous stratigraphic units in Pennsylvania
- Paleontology in Pennsylvania
