= Old Point Formation =

- Stratigraphic range: Devonian
- Type: Formation

Location
- Region: Pennsylvania
- Country: United States

The Old Point Formation is a geologic formation in Pennsylvania. It preserves fossils dating back to the Devonian period.

== See also ==
- List of fossiliferous stratigraphic units in Pennsylvania
- Paleontology in Pennsylvania
