= Rockdale Run Formation =

Geological formation in the United States

- Stratigraphic range: Lower Ordovician
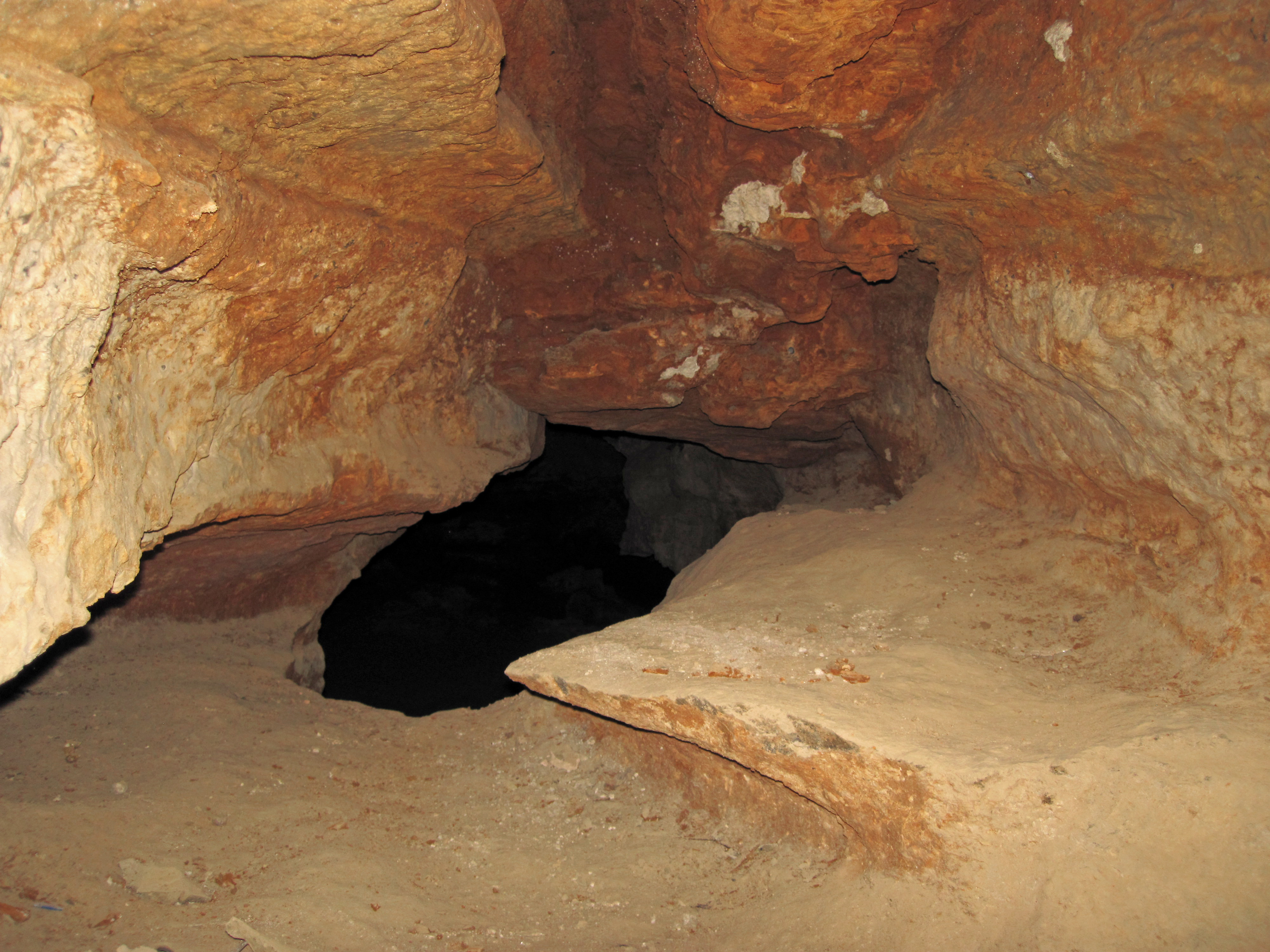
- Rockdale Run Formation in Skyline Caverns, Virginia
- Type: Formation
- Unit of: Beekmantown Group
- Underlies: Pinesburg Station Dolomite
- Overlies: Stonehenge Limestone
- Thickness: 2450 ft

Lithology
- Primary: Limestone
- Other: dolomite, chert

Location
- Region: Maryland, Pennsylvania, Virginia and West Virginia
- Country: United States

The Rockdale Run Formation is a geologic formation in Maryland, Pennsylvania, Virginia and West Virginia. It preserves fossils dating back to the Ordovician period.

== See also ==
- List of fossiliferous stratigraphic units in Maryland
- List of fossiliferous stratigraphic units in Pennsylvania
- List of fossiliferous stratigraphic units in Virginia
- List of fossiliferous stratigraphic units in West Virginia
