= Duquesne Coal =

Coal formation in Pennsylvania and Ohio, United States

- Stratigraphic range: Carboniferous
- Type: Formation

Location
- Region: Pennsylvania, Ohio
- Country: United States

The Duquesne Coal is a geologic formation located in Pennsylvania and Ohio. It preserves fossils dating back to the Carboniferous period. It was named by Percy Raymond for exposures near Duquesne, Pennsylvania.

== See also ==
- List of fossiliferous stratigraphic units in Ohio
- List of fossiliferous stratigraphic units in Pennsylvania
