= Monmouth Formation =

Geologic formation in Maryland, USA

- Stratigraphic range: Cretaceous
- Type: Formation

Location
- Region: Maryland
- Country: United States

The Monmouth Formation is a geologic formation in Prince George's County, Maryland. It preserves fossils dating back to the Cretaceous period.

== See also ==
- List of fossiliferous stratigraphic units in Maryland
- Paleontology in Maryland
