= Vintage Dolomite =

Geologic formation in Pennsylvania, United States

- Stratigraphic range: Cambrian
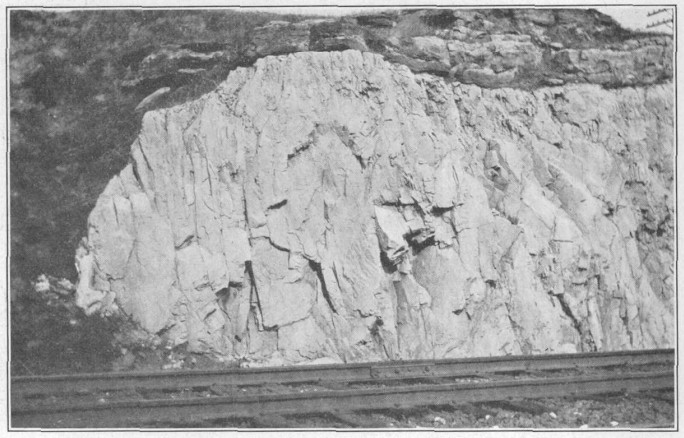
- Upper part of the Vintage Dolomite overlain by Kinzers Shale exposed in cut on the Pennsylvania Railroad near Vintage. This is the type section.
- Type: Formation
- Underlies: Kinzers Formation

Lithology
- Primary: dolomite

Location
- Region: Pennsylvania
- Country: United States

Type section
- Named by: Stose and Jonas (1922)

The Vintage Dolomite is a geologic formation in Pennsylvania. It preserves fossils dating back to the Cambrian period.

== Type section ==
Named from exposures at a railroad cut at Vintage, Lancaster County, Pennsylvania.

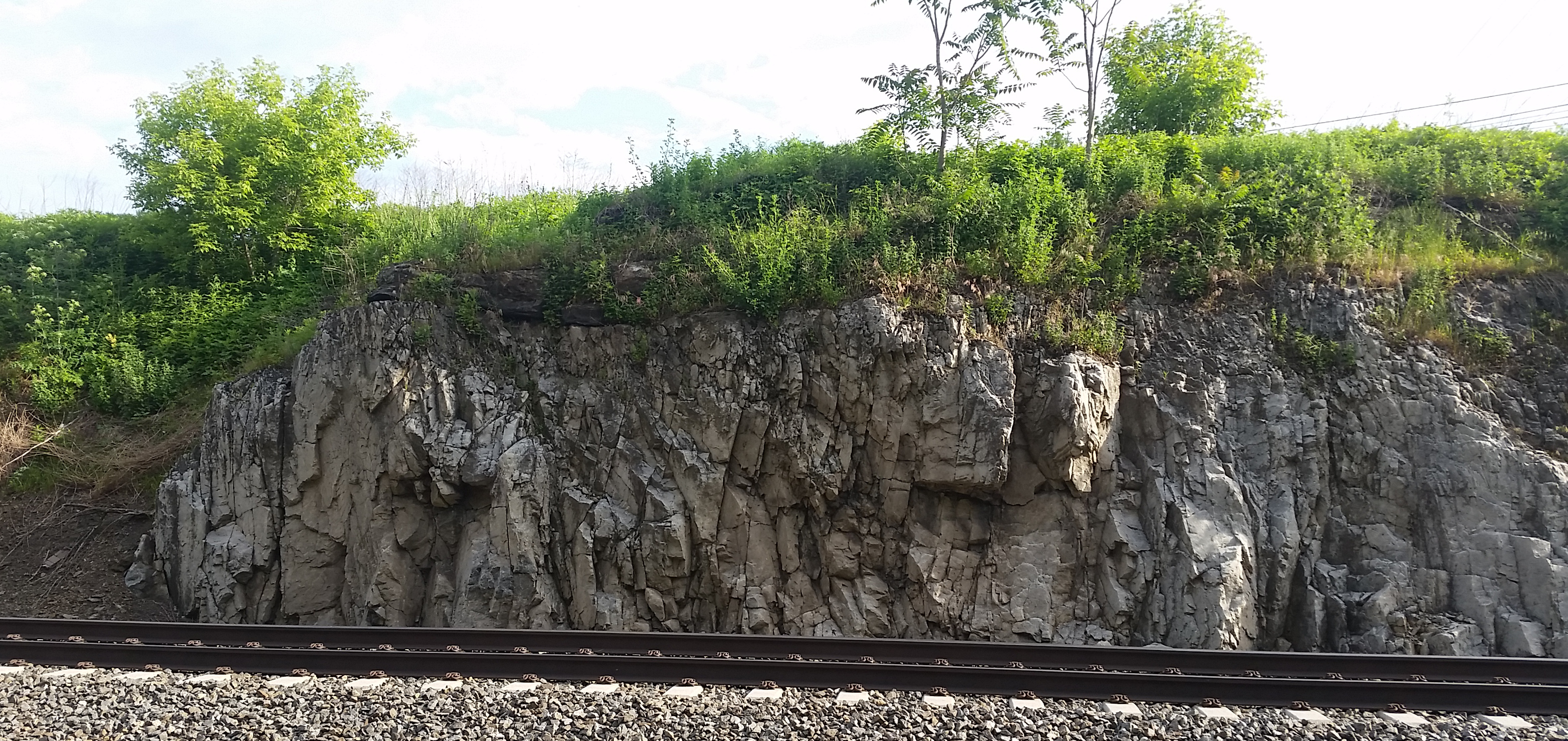
Photo of the type section in 2019. The Kinzers Formation overlying the dolomite is about a meter thick in this photo.

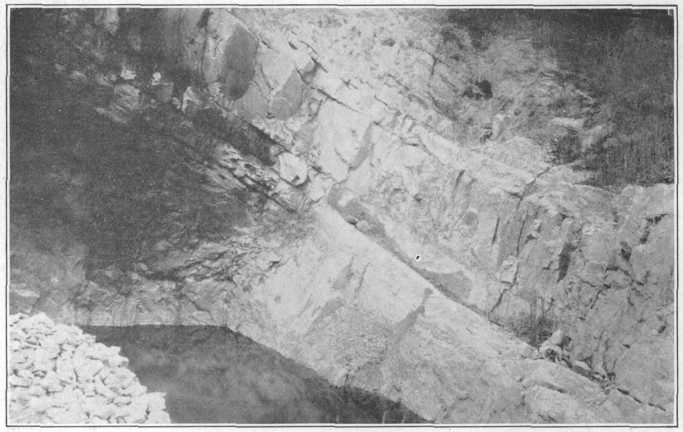
Vintage Dolomite in quarry at Kinzers. Shows well-bedded character of lower part of Vintage dolomite.

== Fossils ==
Salterella conulata species have been found in the upper Vintage Dolomite.

== See also ==
- List of fossiliferous stratigraphic units in Pennsylvania
- Paleontology in Pennsylvania
