= Talbot Formation =

- Stratigraphic range: Neogene
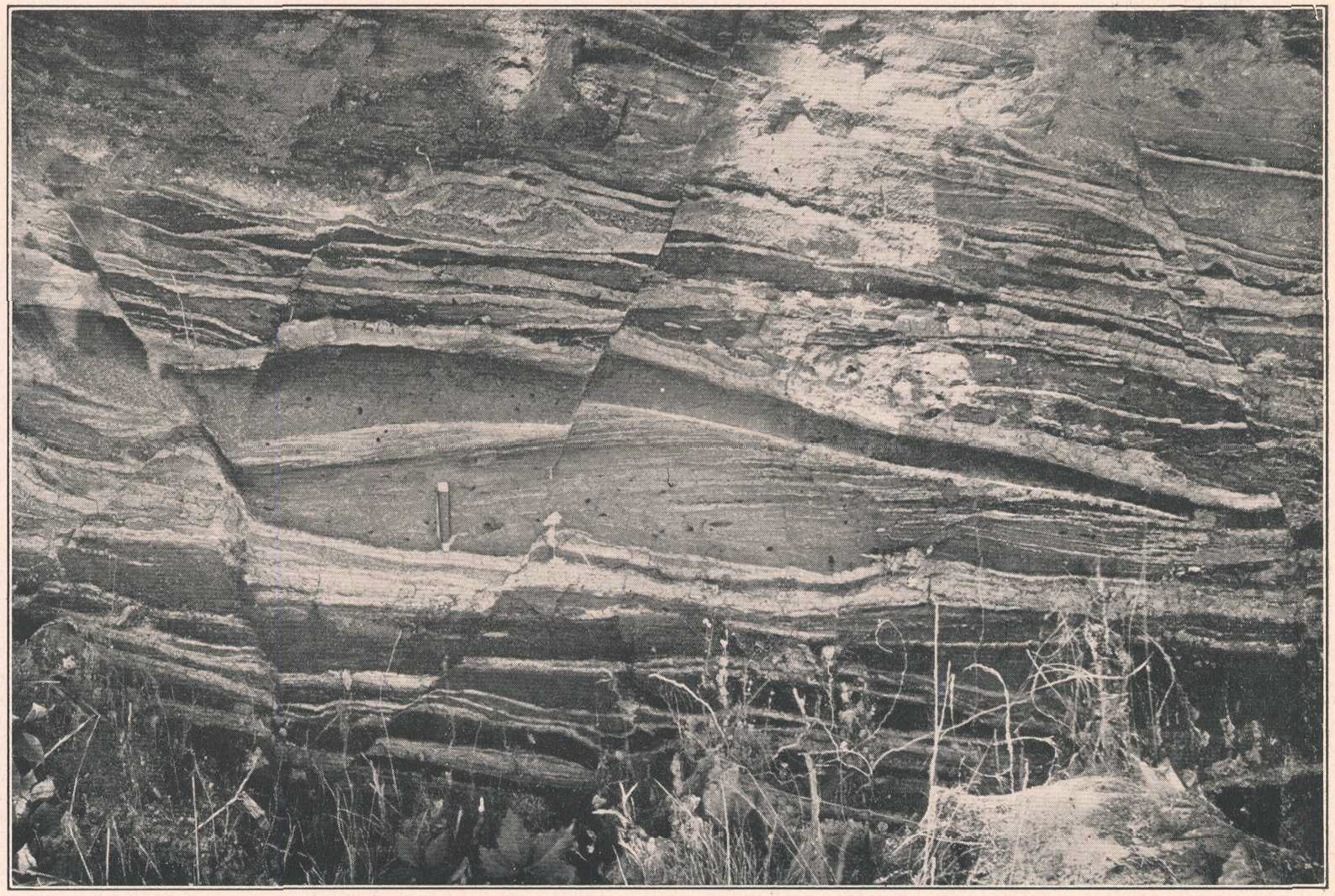
- Minor faulting of interbedded clay and sand of Talbot Formation on Morgan Creek
- Type: Formation

Location
- Region: Maryland
- Country: United States

Type section
- Named for: Talbot County, Maryland
- Named by: G. B. Shattuck (1901)

The Talbot Formation is a geologic formation in that goes along that Atlantic Coastal Plain from Delaware to Florida. It preserves fossils dating back to the Neogene period.

The term is no longer formally recognized but occurs in geologic literature. The term is retained as a geomorphic feature, the Talbot terrace.

== See also ==
- List of fossiliferous stratigraphic units in Maryland
- Paleontology in Maryland
