= Glenshaw Formation =

Geological formation in the United States

- Stratigraphic range: Pennsylvanian
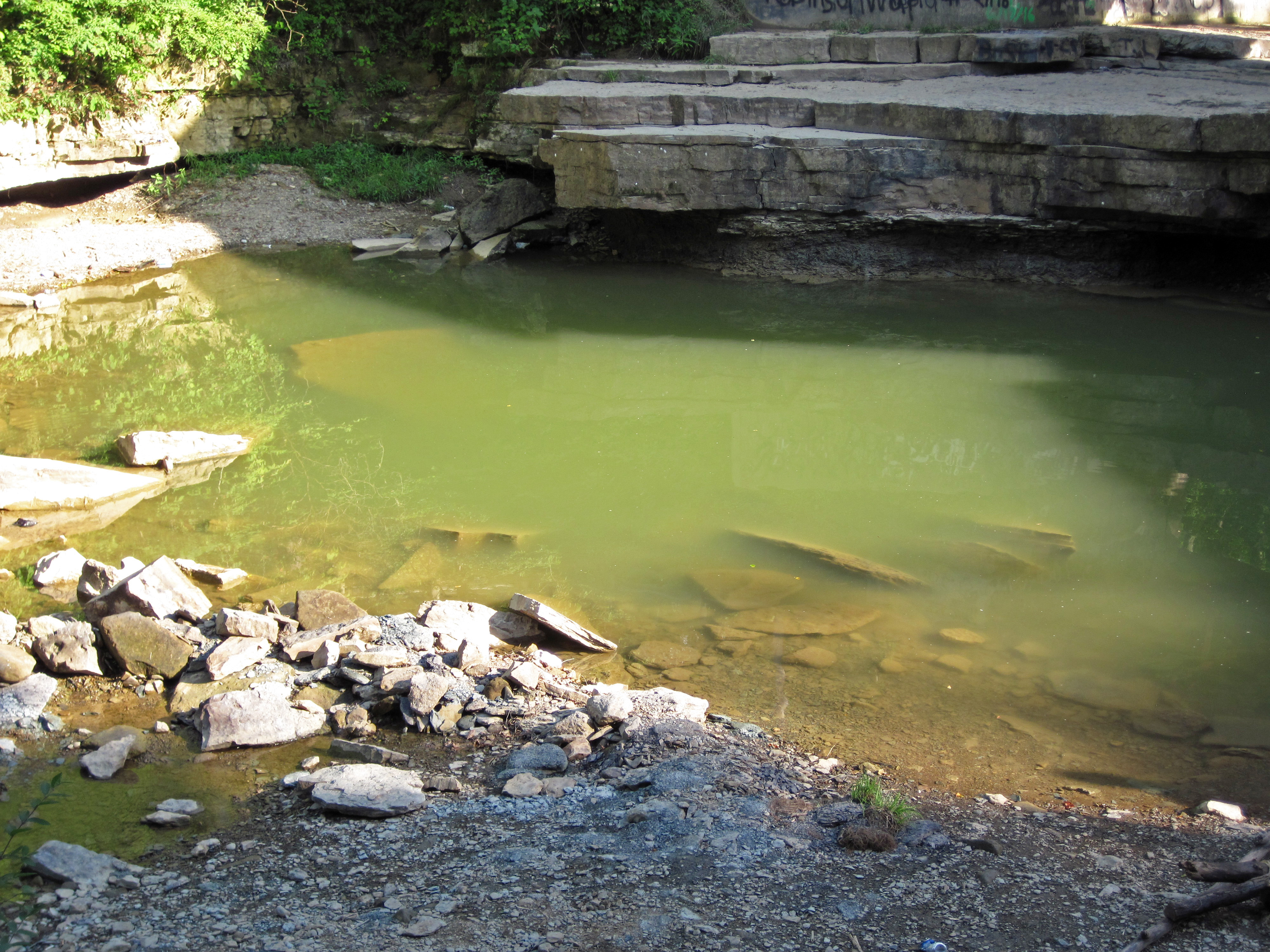
- Outcrops of Brush Creek Limestone, Glenshaw Formation, in Ohio
- Type: sedimentary
- Unit of: Conemaugh Group
- Sub-units: Ames Limestone Member, Mahoning Sandstone Member, Brush Creek Limestone
- Underlies: Casselman Formation
- Overlies: Allegheny Formation

Lithology
- Primary: shale, siltstone, sandstone, red beds, coal
- Other: limestone

Location
- Region: Appalachian Plateau
- Country: United States
- Extent: Pennsylvania, Maryland, West Virginia, Ohio

Type section
- Named by: N. K. Flint, 1965

The Glenshaw Formation is a mapped sedimentary bedrock unit in Pennsylvania, Maryland, West Virginia, and Ohio, of Pennsylvanian age. It is the lower of two formations in the Conemaugh Group, the upper being the Casselman Formation. The boundary between these two units is the top of the marine Ames Limestone. The Conemaugh Group overlies the Upper Freeport coal bed of the Allegheny Formation and underlies the Pittsburgh coal seam of the Monongahela Group.

The Conemaugh Group consists of cyclic sequences of shale, siltstone, sandstone, red beds, thin impure limestone, and thin nonpersistent coal. Red beds are associated with landslides.

The thickness of the Conemaugh Group averages about 400 feet in Ohio, and it ranges from 450 feet on the Ohio River in West Virginia to 520 feet in Washington County, Pennsylvania, and then to 890 feet in Somerset County, Pennsylvania.

The Glenshaw formation was originally mapped in Pennsylvania by Flint, but was extended into West Virginia by Cardwell et al. in 1968. It is also recognized in eastern Ohio.
