= Vintage, Pennsylvania =

Unincorporated community in Pennsylvania, U.S.

- Unincorporated community
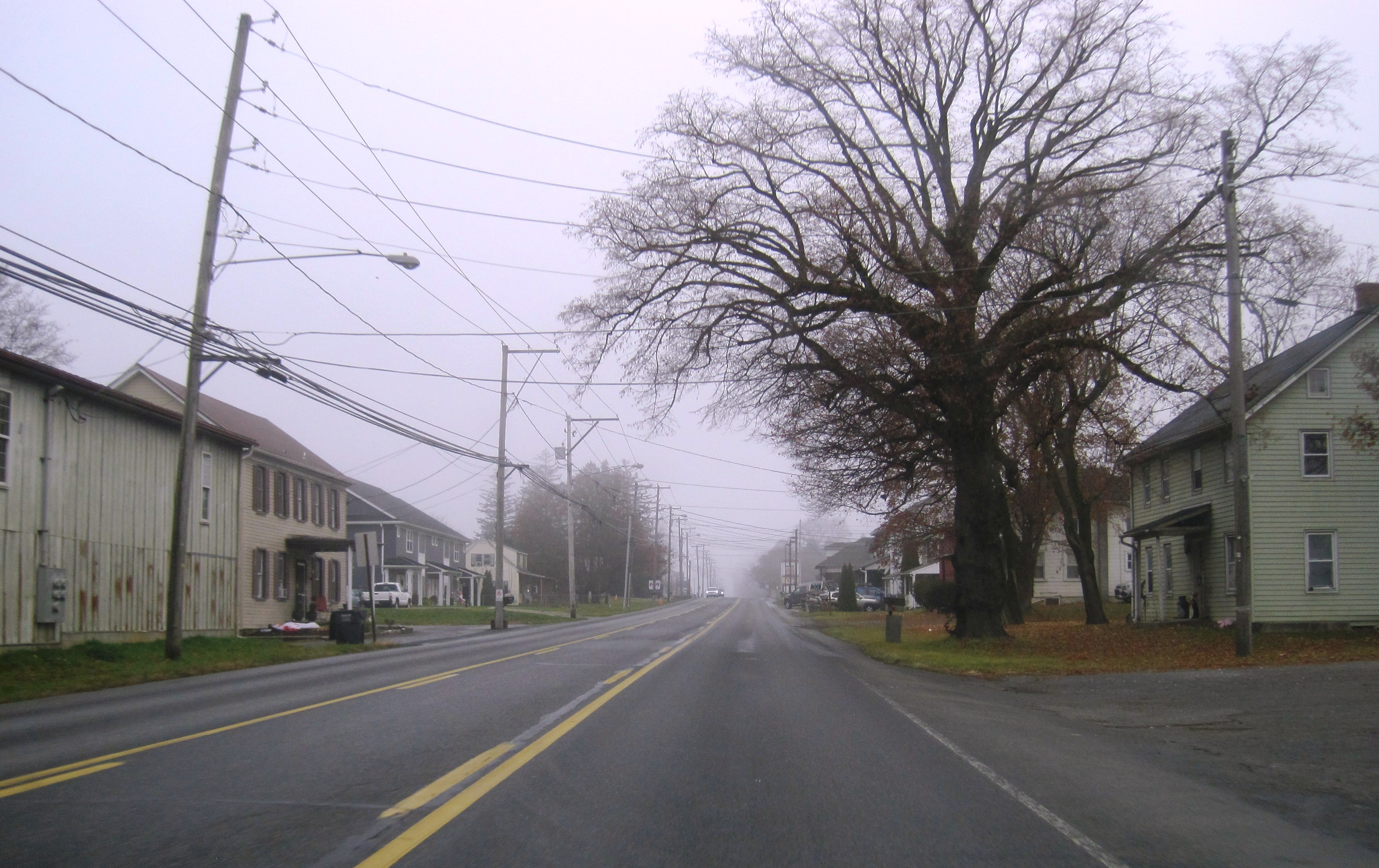
- Westbound US 30 through Vintage

- Location within Pennsylvania Location within the United States
- Country: United States
- State: Pennsylvania
- County: Lancaster
- Township: Paradise Township
- Elevation: 436 ft (133 m)
- Time zone: UTC-5 (Eastern (EST))
  - Summer (DST): UTC-4 (EDT)
- Area code: 717
- GNIS feature ID: 1190436

Vintage is an unincorporated community located in Paradise Township, Lancaster County, Pennsylvania, United States. It is located approximately two miles to the east of the town of Paradise, on U.S. Route 30.

The Paradise Quarry, currently owned and operated by Allan Myers, Inc., is just south of Vintage on McIlvaine Road.

The Vintage Dolomite is named after exposures along the Pennsylvania Railroad near Vintage.
