= Bellemont, Pennsylvania =

Unincorporated community in Pennsylvania, US

Coordinates: 39°59′41″N 76°06′05″W

Bellemont is an unincorporated community located in Paradise Township, Lancaster County, Pennsylvania, United States. It is located approximately one mile to the southeast of the town of Paradise.
