= Washington Formation =

American geologic formation

- Stratigraphic range: Permian
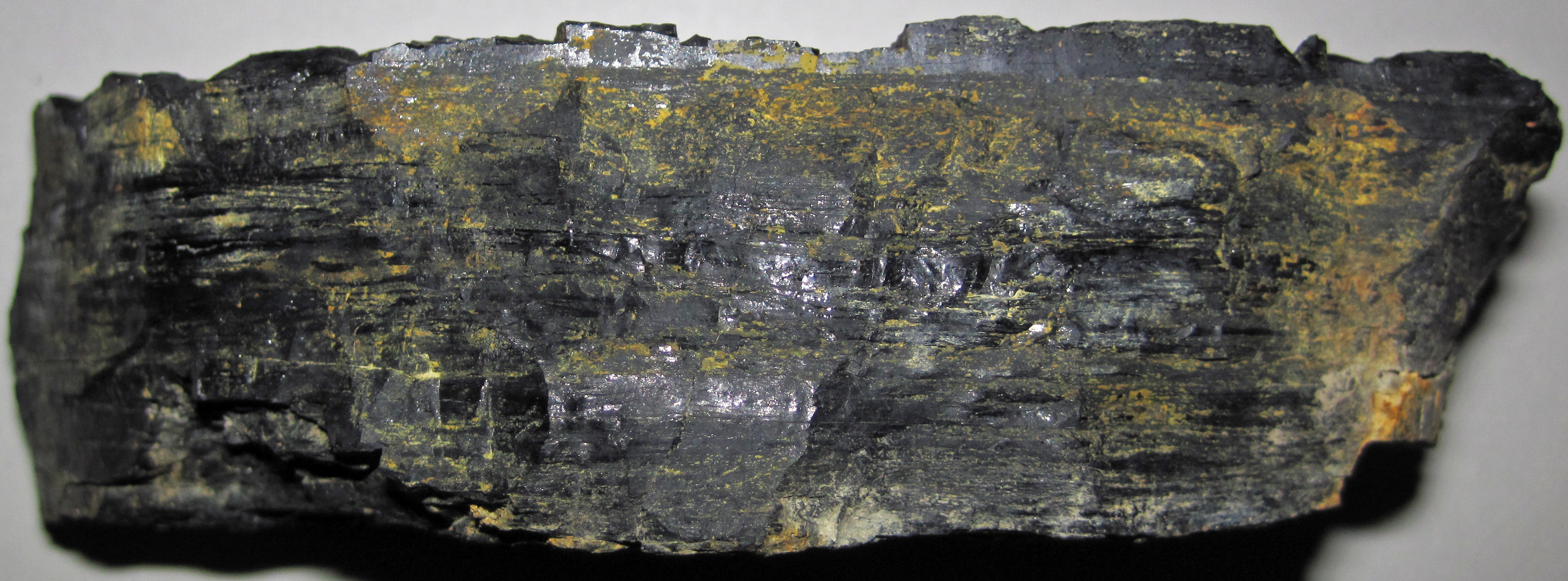
- Bituminous coal (Washington Coal, Upper Pennsylvanian; Ohio)
- Type: Formation
- Unit of: Dunkard Group
- Sub-units: Upper Washington Jollytown coal Hundred sandstone Upper Marietta; Washington “A” coal Middle Washington; Lower Washington; Lower Marietta; Washington (No. 12) coal Little Washington coal Mannington sandstone Waynesburg “A” coal Waynesburg Sandstone; Elm Grove limestone Cassville
- Underlies: Greene Formation
- Overlies: Waynesburg Formation

Lithology
- Primary: limestone, sandstone, coal
- Other: shale

Location
- Region: Ohio and West Virginia
- Country: United States

The Washington Formation is a coal, sandstone, and limestone geologic formation located in Ohio, Pennsylvania and West Virginia. It dates back to the Lower Permian period, with its base at or near the Permian/Carboniferous boundary. The Washington formation and the Dunkard Group as a whole was deposited at a time when the continents were in the process of forming the "Super Continent" Pangaea as well as a gradual drop in sea levels. The result during this period was coals being thinner and impure with high ash content. The limestones found with in the formation are exclusively freshwater deposits.

== Paleofauna ==
The paleofauna of the Washington Formation is considered similar to that of the Texas Red Beds, sharing many fish and tetrapod taxa. Some of the taxa listed suggest an Artinskian age. Lucas et al 2013 discusses the fauna of the formation.

=== Synapsida ===
Synapsids of the Washington Formation
| Genus | Species | Notes |
|---|---|---|
| Dimetrodon | D.limbatus | Stated to be from a large specimen. |
| Edaphosaurus | E.boanerges | A large edaphosaurid. |
| Ophiacodon | O.retroversus | An ophiacodontid. Stated to be large. |
| Sphenacodontia indet. | Indeterminate | An indeterminate sphenacodont. |

=== Reptiliomorpha ===
Reptiliomorphs of the Washington Formation
| Genus | Species | Notes |
|---|---|---|
| Diadectes | D. sp. | A large diadectid. |
| Protorothyris | P.archeri | A protorothyrid. |

=== Amphibia ===
Amphibians of the Washington Formation
| Genus | Species | Notes |
|---|---|---|
| Eryops | E.megacephalus | A large temnospondyl. |
| Acheloma | A.sp | A terrestrial temnospondyl. |
| Trimerorhachis | T.insignis | A fully aquatic temnospondyl. |
| Diploceraspis | D.burkei | An aquatic lepospondyl with large outward growths of the head. |
| Zatrachys | Z.sp | An armored terrestrial temnospondyl. |
| Edops | E.sp | An aquatic temnospondyl. |
| Megamolgophis | M.agostini | A possible lysophorian. |
| Brachydectes | B.sp | A lysophorian. |

=== Selachia ===
Selachians of the Washington Formation
| Genus | Species | Notes |
|---|---|---|
| Orthacanthus | O.texensis | A large selachian. |
| Xenacanthus | X.luederensis | A small selachian. |
| Barbclabornia | B.luederensis | A giant selachian. |

=== Osteichthyes ===
Osteicthyes of the Washington Formation
| Genus | Species | Notes |
|---|---|---|
| Ectosteorhachis | E.sp | A large lobe finned fish. |
| Palaeoniscoidea indet. | Indet. | Indeterminate paleoniscoids. |
| Monongahela | M.sp. | A dipnoan. |
