= Jennings Formation =

Geologic feature in Marylandㅤㅤ

- Stratigraphic range: Devonian
- Type: Formation

Location
- Region: Maryland
- Country: United States

The Jennings Formation is a geologic formation in Maryland. It preserves fossils dating back to the Devonian period.

== See also ==
- List of fossiliferous stratigraphic units in Maryland
- Paleontology in Maryland

== Additional sources ==
- Various Contributors to the Paleobiology Database. "Fossilworks: Gateway to the Paleobiology Database". Archived from the original on 25 March 2022.
