= Dunkard Group =

- Stratigraphic range: Pennsylvanian-Permian
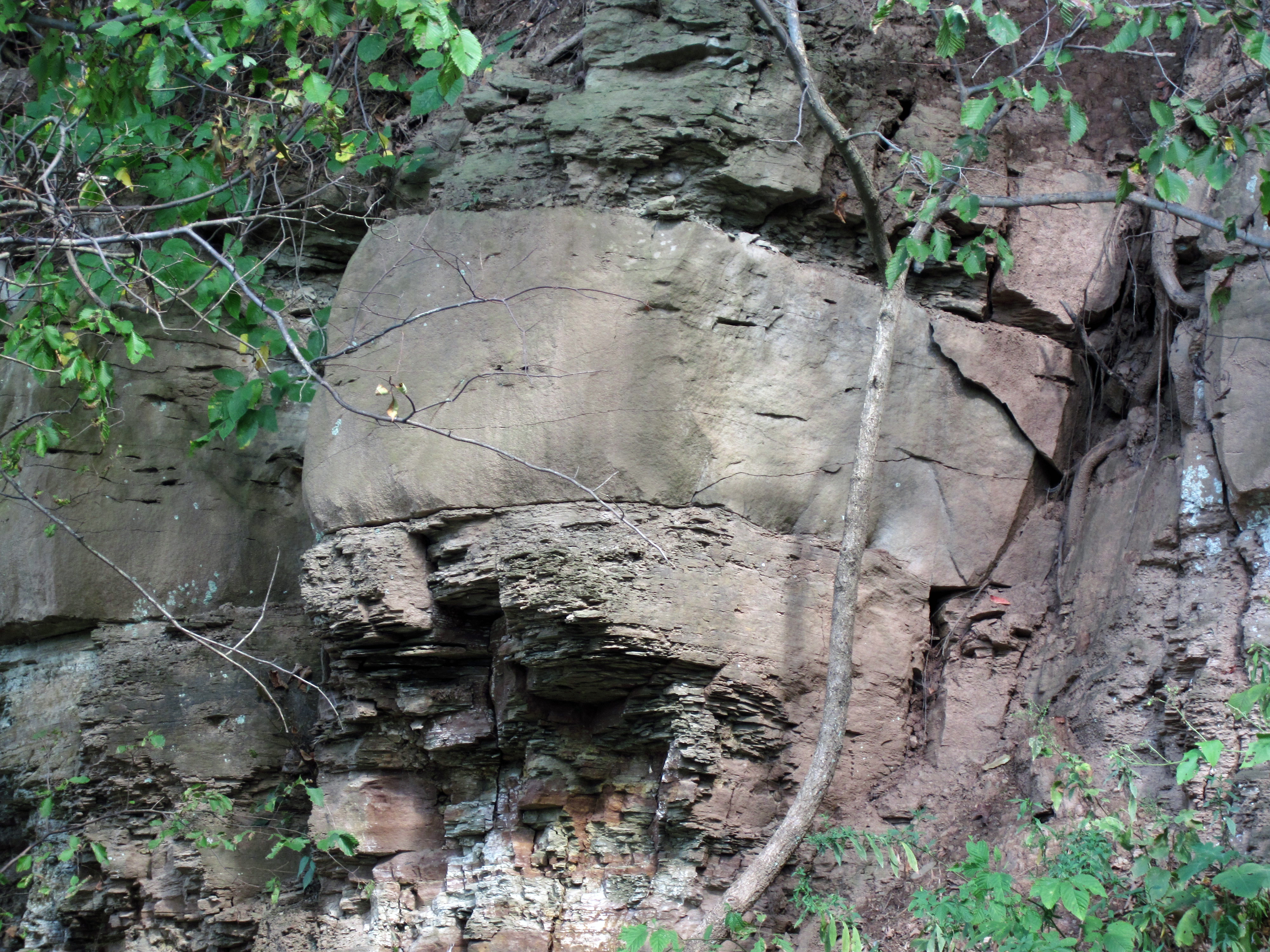
- Sandstone (Greene Formation, Dunkard Group, Lower Permian; Monroe County, Ohio)
- Type: Group
- Sub-units: Greene Formation, Washington Formation, Waynesburg Formation
- Underlies: Igneous intrusives
- Overlies: Monongahela Formation

Lithology
- Primary: Shale, sandstone, siltstone, coal
- Other: Limestone

Location
- Region: Ohio, Pennsylvania, West Virginia, and Maryland
- Country: United States

Type section
- Named for: Dunkard Creek
- Named by: I.C. White in 1891

The Permian Dunkard Group (Pd) is an area of rock, Early Permian in age, in the south of Ohio, southwestern Pennsylvania, West Virginia and the hilltops of the Georges Creek Basin of Maryland. In Ohio, it is found primarily in Washington County. It is notable for being one of the few areas of Permian sediment east of the Mississippi River. In addition, it is the youngest surface rock in the state of Ohio.

== Description ==
It consists of red and green shale, siltstone, and sandstone, with thin lenticular beds of argillaceous limestone and thin beds of impure coal The base of the layer contains thick-bedded, white conglomeratic sandstone. The layer's thickness is greater than 200 feet in Maryland.

The fossils found in the Dunkard Group are similar to ones found in Texas and Oklahoma of similar age.

== Stratigraphy ==
The Dunkard contains three formation. Starting at the base (oldest) is the Waynesburg Formation, Washington Formation, and Greene Formation. The base is marked by the Waynesburg Coal, with the Monongahela Group below. The Washington Coal is found at the base of the Washington Formation and its base marks the boundary between the lower Waynesburg and the Washington formation above. The top of the Upper Washington Limestone marks the line between the Washington Formation and the upper Greene formation.

== Fossil content ==
Portrait	Name
	Dimetrodon
	Ctenospondylus
	Archaeothyris
	Edaphosaurus
	Eryops
	Xenacanthus
	Ophiacodon
	Diploceraspis
	Protorothyris
	Diadectes
	Isodectes
	Brachydectes
	Phlegethontia
	Baldwinonus
	Sagenodus
	Sysciophlebia balteata
