= Venango Group =

Geologic formation in the United States

- Stratigraphic range: Upper Devonian
- Type: Geological group
- Sub-units: Panama Sandstone Member (3rd Sand); Bimber Run Conglomerate Member; Amity Shale; Salamanca Sandstone (2nd Sand); North Warren Shale Member; Sagerstown Shale; Pope Hollow Conglomerate Member; Woodcock Sandstone Member (1st Sand)
- Underlies: Riceville Formation

Lithology
- Primary: Sandstone, Siltstone
- Other: Shale

Location
- Region: New York, Ohio Pennsylvania, West Virginia
- Country: United States

Type section
- Named for: Venango County
- Named by: Carll (1880)

The Venango Group, or Venango Sand is an Upper Devonian aged geological unit found in western Pennsylvania, western New York south east Ohio and central to western West Virginia. The Venango is the geologic unit that was produced after the Drake Well discovered oil in Venango County, Pennsylvania.

== Description ==
The Venango is made gray sandstones, often interbedded, light-gray siltstones, shales, with occasional conglomerate lenses. Colors vary from gray to light gray sandstones and conglomerates, to light blueish or greenish gray siltstones and dark gray to reddish gray shales. The reddish colors tend to be found further east where the Venango interfingers with the Catskill Formation. There are three major sand members of the Venango in ascending order; Panama sand, Salamanca Sandstone and the Woodcock Sandstone. All three have a history of oil production. Between each sandstone member are beds of shale and siltstone.

Informal names for members of the Venango are derived from names given by well drillers over the years. Drillers' nomenclature: Hundred-Foot sand, First Sand, Nineveh, Second Sand, Gordon Stray, Bayard, Elizabeth, Third Sand and Sweet Richard.

== Oil Production ==
After Edwin Drake successfully drill what is generally accepted as the world's first commercial oil well, people flocked to Venango County to strike it rich. This was the world's first oil boom.
