= Waynesburg Formation =

Geological formation in the United States

- Stratigraphic range: Carboniferous
- Type: Formation
- Unit of: Dunkard Group

Lithology
- Primary: Sandstone, siltstone, coal

Location
- Region: West Virginia, Pennsylvania
- Country: United States

Type section
- Named for: Waynesburg, Pennsylvania

The Waynesburg Formation is a coal, sandstone, and siltstone geologic formation in West Virginia and Pennsylvania. It preserves fossils dating back to the Permian period.

== Description ==
The Waynesburg Formation has a complicated history with the name being assigned to up to six different stratigraphic units. It consists of a basal coal bed, an unnamed sandstone member formerly called the Waynesburg Sandstone, and a sandy siltstone member. The basal coal member is considered mineable.

== See also ==
- List of fossiliferous stratigraphic units in West Virginia
