= Greene Formation =

Early Permian formation found in Pennsylvania, West Virginia and Ohio

- Stratigraphic range: Early Permian, Kungurian
- Type: Formation
- Unit of: Dunkard Group
- Overlies: Washington Formation
- Thickness: 200 metres (660 ft)

Lithology
- Primary: shale, mudstone, sandstone
- Other: limestone, coal

Location
- Region: Ohio, West Virginia, Pennsylvania
- Country: United States

Type section
- Named for: Greene County

Greene Formation is a geologic formation located in Ohio, West Virginia and Pennsylvania that has been dated to the Seymouran Land-Vertebrate Faunachron of the Early Permian. It is the youngest formation within the Dunkard Group, putting it right above the Washington Formation stereographically.

== Description ==
The geology of the Greene Formation mostly contains a mix of shaly sandstone and shale with facies containing limestone and coal. Though the currently preserved thickness of the formation is around 200 meters, the top of the formation has been eroded away, making it impossible to tell the full depth of the formation.

== Paleobiota ==
=== Chondrichthyes ===
Genus	Species	Notes	Image
Barbclabornia	B. luedersensis	A large xenocath shark from the Permian of North America. Due to the shape of the dentition, it is believed that it would have been a filter-feeder comparable to whale and basking sharks.	

=== Dipnoi ===
Genus	Species	Notes	Image
Sagenodus	S. sp	A widespread genus of lungfish that shows a transitional phase between the Devonian and Post-Paleozoic lungfish structures. Found at the Clark Hill locality, in the same quarry as Ctenospondylus and Trimerorhachis.	

=== Lepospondyli ===
Genus	Species	Notes	Image
Brachydectes	B. sp	A small lysorophian that was originally assigned to the genus Lysorophus though was later reassigned to the genus Brachydectes.	
Diploceraspis	D. burkei	A diplocaulid and most well-known Nectridean from the formation, it's been suggested that the shape of the head caused by the extreme lengthening of the tabular and squamosal bones of the skull may be convergent to those found in Diplocaulus rather than from a common ancestor.	
Lysorophus	L. dunkardensis	A small lysorophian with a serpent-like body and short limbs, it's questioned if the genus is valid though L. dunkardensis is still currently assigned to the genus.	
Megamolgophis	M. agostinii	A very large lysorophian estimated at a length of 1.3 meters. Like other lysorophians, the animal's limbs were extremely small but unlike others, Megamologophis's vertebral centra were comparatively complicated.	

=== Synapsida ===
Genus	Species	Notes	Image
Ctenospondylus	C. ninevehensis	A large sphenacodontid with sorter neural spines than seen in Dimetrodon, the animal is also an index taxa for the Seymouran LVF.	
Edaphosaurus		A large and widespread edaphosaurid that had spines coming off on the sides of its neural arches, a characteristic of the family. Just like seen in formations in Texas, there is a transition in the species between earlier and later strata of the group. Between the Washington and Greene formations, a shift from E. cf. E. boanerges to E. cf. E. cruciger.	
Ophiacodon	O. cf. O. uniformis	A large and late surviving ophiacodontid known from 10 vertebrae, along with an incomplete left forelimb.	

=== Temnospondyli ===
Genus	Species	Notes	Image
Eryops	E. cf. E. megacephalus	A large eryopid that is common throughout the Dunkard Group that looks most similar to E. megacephalus though this would make it the only member of the family to come from the group.	
Trimerorhachis	T.sp	A medium-sized dvinosaurid with small-poorly ossified limbs, there's not much known about the specimen found in the Greene Formation, only that it was found in the same quarry as the holotype of Ctenospondylus ninevehensis.	
Zatrachys	Z. cf. Z. serratus	A zatrachydid known from a fairly complete skull, though it can't be assigned to a specific species within the genus. This is mainly because of some inconsistences in the sutural lines of the skull table when comparing them to those found in New Mexico.	

=== Tetrapodamorpha ===
Genus	Species	Notes	Image
Ambedus	A. pusillus	A small tetrapodamorph originally classified as a diadectid though later studies have since concluded that the features in the teeth that placed the animal within the group were a result of convergent evolution. It's unknown if Ambedus is even within diadectimorpha.	

=== Plants ===
Genus	Species	Notes	Image
Alethopteris	?A. sp		
Autunia	A. conferta		
Autunia	A. naumannii		
Lepidophylloides	L. sp		
Lodevia	L. oxydata		
Pecopteris	?P. sp		
Rhachiphyllum	R. schenkii		
Sigillaria	S. brardii		
Sigillaria	S. sp.		

== Paleoenvironment ==
The paleoenvironment of the Greene Formation was a lake in a seasonal dry area shown by the large amounts of vertisols, especially when compared to earlier formations in the group. Around the lake there would have been both seed ferns and lycophytes though much fewer in numbers than earlier in the Dunkard Group; being shown by the steady decrease in the amount and depth of coal layers within the group. The overall trends in the paleosols of the Greene Formation are seen in the general transition to more arid climates from the Pennsylvanian to Middle Permian.
