= Pittsburgh coal seam =

Coal bed in the Appalachian Basin

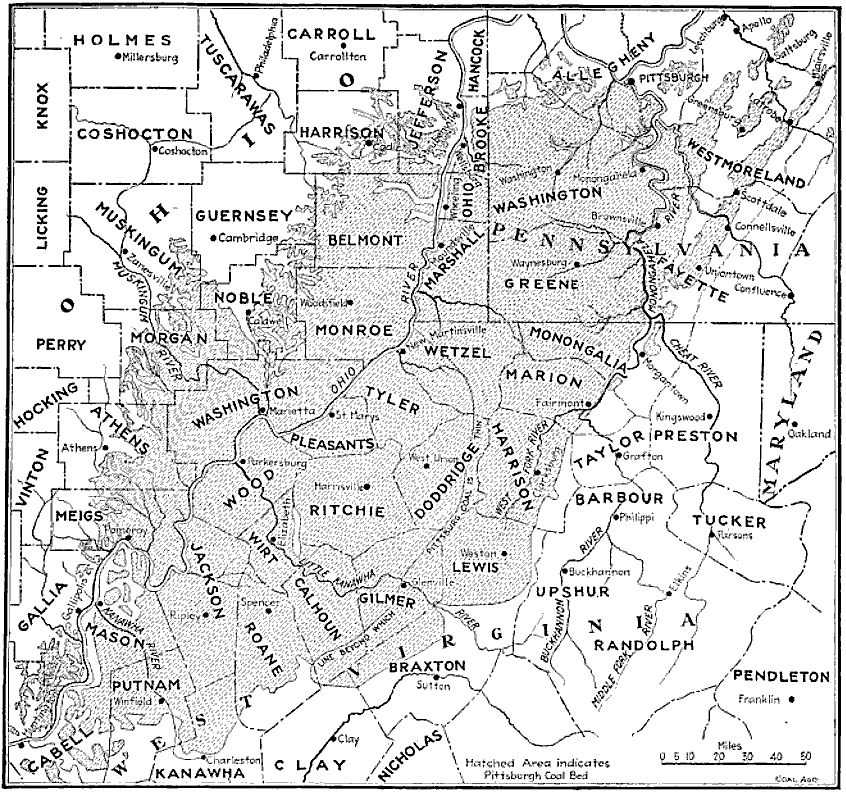
Extent of the Pittsburgh coal seam in Pennsylvania, Ohio and West Virginia, excluding the deposit in Maryland. Note that the southwestern portion of the seam is of negligible economic importance.

The Pittsburgh coal seam is the thickest and most extensive coal bed in the Appalachian Basin; hence, it is the most economically important coal bed in the eastern United States. The Upper Pennsylvanian Pittsburgh coal bed of the Monongahela Group is extensive and continuous, extending over 11,000 mi^{2} through 53 counties. It extends from Allegany County, Maryland to Belmont County, Ohio and from Allegheny County, Pennsylvania southwest to Putnam County, West Virginia.

This coal seam is named for its outcrop high on the sheer north face of Mount Washington in Pittsburgh, Pennsylvania, and it is considered to form the base of the upper coal measures of the Allegheny Plateau, now known as the Monongahela Group. The first reference to the Pittsburgh coal bed, named by H.D. Rodgers of the First Geological Survey of Pennsylvania, was on a 1751 map.

The section of the Pittsburgh seam under the Georges Creek Valley of Western Maryland is known as The Big Vein This is isolated from the rest of the Pittsburgh seam by Savage Mountain (part of the Deer Park anticline), the Negro Mountain anticline, the Laurel Hill anticline, and the Chestnut Ridge anticline. Between these anticlines, the strata containing the Pittsburgh coal have been almost obliterated by erosion. The exception is a small remnant in Somerset County, Pennsylvania, in the Berlin Syncline between Negro Mountain and Savage Mountain.

== Formation ==
The Pittsburgh coal is one of many minable coal beds that were deposited across the Pennsylvanian (late Carboniferous) and Permian (330–265mya) eras in a subsiding foreland basin that was filled in with sediments eroded from an ancient landmass located to the east. The Monongahela Group and other northern and central Appalachian Basin (fig. 1) Pennsylvanian sediments were deposited on an aggrading and prograding coastal plain within a foreland basin adjacent to the Alleghanian fold and thrust belt.

The Pittsburgh coal bed formed during a hiatus in active clastic deposition that allowed for the development of a huge peat mire. The extensively thick peat deposit was destined to become one of the most valuable energy resources in the world. The distribution of some of the sediments, particularly the channel sands, may have been controlled in part by deep, Early Cambrian basement faults that were reactivated during the Alleghany orogeny (Root and Hoskins, 1977; Root, 1995).

Significant parts of the clay layer immediately below the Pittsburgh coal rest on an unconformity, that is, an old eroded surface. For this reason, the Pittsburgh seam is taken as the basal member of the Monongahela Group. The underlying erosion surface is considered the top of the Conemaugh Group, formerly known as the Lower barren measures because this formation contains few coal seams.

The Monongahela is composed mainly of sandstone, limestone, dolomite, and coal, and consists of a series of up to ten cyclothems. During each cyclothem, the land was flooded, allowing the accumulation of marine deposits such as shale, limestone and sandstone. When the sea level fell, coal formed from the remains of swampland. Some of the coal beds in the Monongahela group are erratic, sometimes little more than a black streak in the rock, while others are of commercial importance.

The Pittsburgh coal seam is laterally extensive. It commonly occurs in southwestern Pennsylvania in two benches, and the lower bench can be over six feet thick. The Pittsburgh rider coal bed, which overlies the lower bench, can range from 0 to 3 feet in thickness.

== Exploitation ==
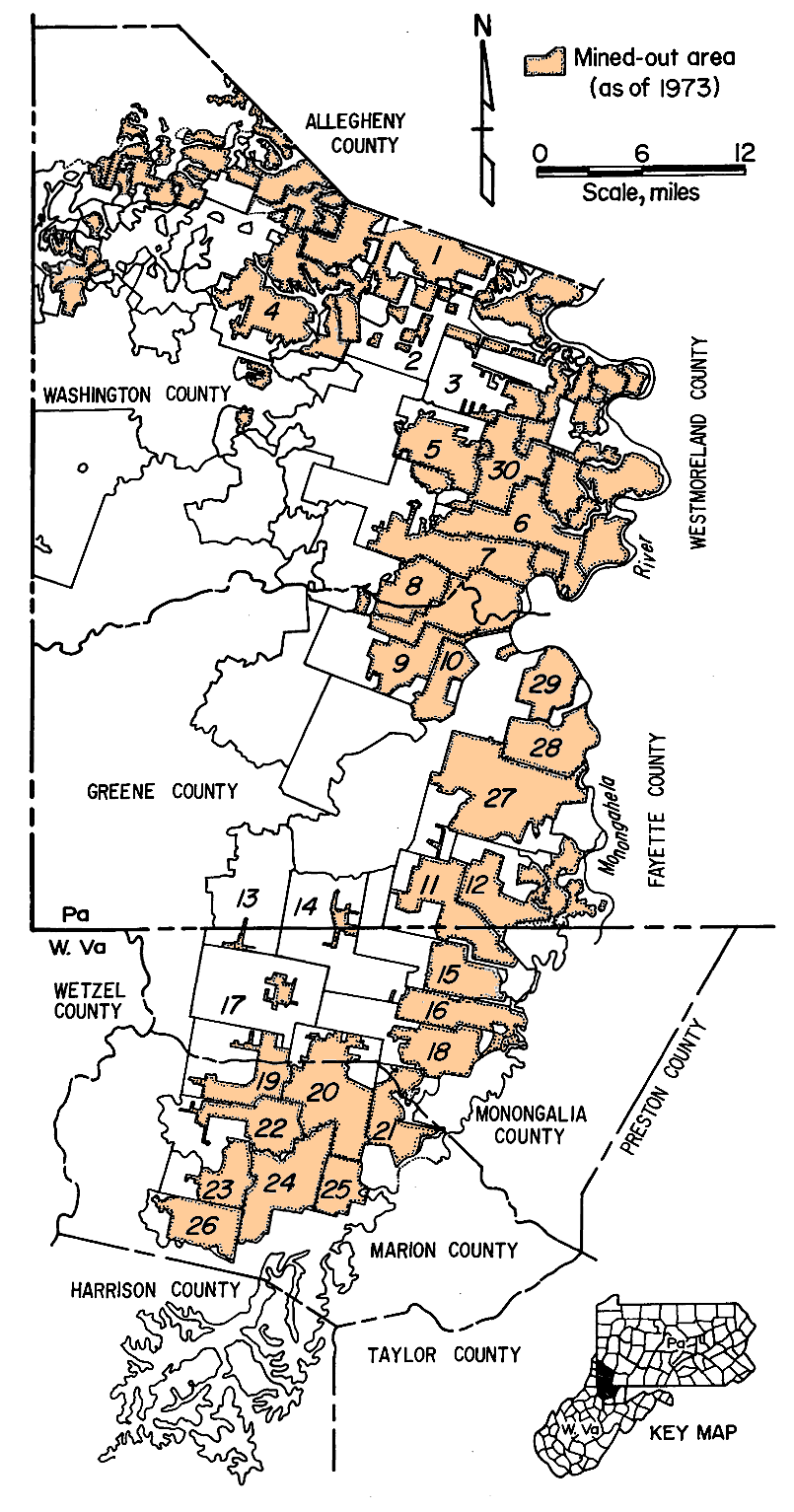
Mined out areas of the Pittsburgh Seam in Pennsylvania and West Virginia as of 1973.

In 1760, Captain Thomas Hutchins visited Fort Pitt and reported that there was a mine on Coal Hill, the original name given to Mount Washington across the Monongahela River from the fort. The coal was extracted from drift mine entries into the Pittsburgh coal seam at outcrop along the hillside about 200 feet above the river. The coal was poured into trenches dug into the hillside, rolled to the edge of the river, and transported by canoe and boats to the military garrison. Sometime around 1765, a fire broke out in this mine, which continued to burn for years, leading to collapse of part of the face of the hill. Mining rights were formally purchased from the chiefs of the Six Nations in 1768, and from this point on, coal fueled the explosive growth of industry in the Pittsburgh Region.

By 1796, coal mines extended along the face of Mount Washington for 300 fathoms (1800 feet), centered across the Monongahela from Wood Street.40°25′55.74″N 80°0′24.08″W By 1814, there were at least 40 coal mines in the Pittsburgh region, worked from adits in the face of the coal seam using room and pillar methods. By 1830, the city of Pittsburgh consumed more than 400 tons per day of bituminous coal for domestic and light industrial use. In the early 19th century, Pittsburgh coal became the city's primary fuel source: about 250,000 bushels (approximately 400 short tons) of coal were consumed daily for domestic and light industrial use. The primary reason for the switch from wood to coal was one of economics. In 1809, a cord of wood cost $2.00 and a bushel of coal cost $0.06, delivered. The coal was plentiful and laborers, working in mines within a mile of Pittsburgh, earned about $1.60 per week and could produce as many as 100 bushels of coal daily.

The Pittsburgh seam was America's principal seam of coal production during the late nineteenth and early twentieth century. Pittsburgh-seam coal was ideally suited to making coke, particularly for iron blast furnaces. It fostered the development of much of southwestern Pennsylvania, particularly a section of the Pittsburgh seam known as the Connellsville district.

Exploitation of the Pittsburgh-seam coal began slowly. Initially, blacksmiths and foundrymen made coal into coke to use in their hearths and small furnaces. During the early nineteenth century, entrepreneurs in western Pennsylvania adapted British coke-making practices to produce coke for local iron works. To make coke, coal is burned under controlled conditions to drive off volatile matter (gases expelled when coal is burned), leaving carbon and ash from the coal fused together in the form of coke. They made coke in turf-covered "mounds," in which coal burned slowly and without oxygen to drive off impurities. The adoption of beehive coke ovens in the 1830s spurred the use of Pittsburgh-seam coal in iron furnaces, and these ovens made better-quality coke than mounds.

Pittsburgh-seam coal, especially the highest-quality coal found in the Connellsville district, was the best coal in America for making coke. When converted into coke, it was sufficiently strong to withstand the weight of iron ore that was piled with coke inside iron furnaces. It has a high proportion of carbon, which accelerates combustion, and a low proportion of impurities, including ash and moisture, which retards combustion. Pittsburgh coal also has a low proportion of sulfur, which is critical to making high-quality iron. In addition, the Pittsburgh seam was located close to Pittsburgh, then the center of the growing American iron and steel industry. Coke had to be transported by water or rail to iron furnaces, and the Pittsburgh seam's proximity to iron furnaces gave the bed another competitive advantage over more distant coal seams that could produce coke.

The mining of Pittsburgh-seam coal boomed off after 1860 as the rapidly expanding iron and steel industry adopted coke. The output of the iron and steel industry burgeoned during the late nineteenth and early twentieth century as demand for steel products surged. To meet the corresponding demand for coke, Pittsburgh-seam mines vastly increased their production from 4.3 million tons of coal in 1880 to a peak of forty million tons in 1916. Most of the pre-1900 growth in coal output occurred in the Connellsville district. However, the iron and steel industry's demand rose so rapidly that it became clear by 1900 that this district could not satisfy demand by itself. During the 1900s and 1910s, mine companies exploited the Lower Connellsville district of the Pittsburgh seam, adding greatly to total output. The growth of Pittsburgh-seam mining was so massive, and so intertwined with coke production for the iron and steel industry, that the late nineteenth and early twentieth century has been called the "Golden Age of King Coal, Queen Coke and Princess Steel."

Beginning in the 1910s, important technological and industrial changes spelled the end of the Pittsburgh seam's importance. By-product coke ovens, which yielded more coke per ton from coal, replaced most beehive coke ovens from 1910 to 1940. By-product ovens utilized coal that was lower quality than Pittsburgh-seam coal, greatly reducing demand for Pittsburgh-seam coal. The Great Depression also contributed significantly to the decline of production. Pittsburgh-seam output continued to fall after a World War II surge as steel mills adopted alternative fuels such as natural gas and oil and improved the energy efficiency of iron furnaces. Another major blow came during the late 1970s and 1980s as the American steel industry closed many steel mills in the Pittsburgh region and elsewhere. The decline of Pittsburgh-seam mining brought large-scale social and economic changes to southwestern Pennsylvania, as unemployment climbed, the region lost population due to out-migration, businesses dependent on coal miners' income folded, and municipalities had declining tax bases.

Despite two centuries of mining, about 16 billion short tons of resources remain, with the largest remaining block in southwestern Pennsylvania and adjacent areas of West Virginia. Much of the remaining resource to the south of Marion County, W. Va., and west through much of Ohio is high in ash and sulfur, and is not likely to be extensively mined in the near future given current economic trends.

=== The Big Vein ===
The Big Vein was discovered in 1804, in an outcrop east of Frostburg, Maryland, but it was not until 1824 that small-scale shipment to Georgetown began. The first mine was the Neff mine, later known as the Eckhart mine 39°39′4.46″N 78°54′1.59″W. Initially, mining was seasonal, confined largely to winter time. Coal was hauled overland to Cumberland, Maryland and then loaded onto flatboats for shipment down the Potomac River during the spring floods. Eckhart Mines, Maryland began as a company town supporting this town, and this mine was merged with other later mines to become what is now Consol Energy.

In 1842, the Baltimore and Ohio Railroad reached Cumberland, followed in 1850 by the Chesapeake and Ohio Canal. These allowed large-scale exploitation.
