= Monongahela Formation =

Geologic formation in West Virginia, Pennsylvania, and Ohio, United States

Monongahela Formation, also Monongahela Group
- Stratigraphic range: Upper Pennsylvanian; Gzhelian; ~300–303 Ma
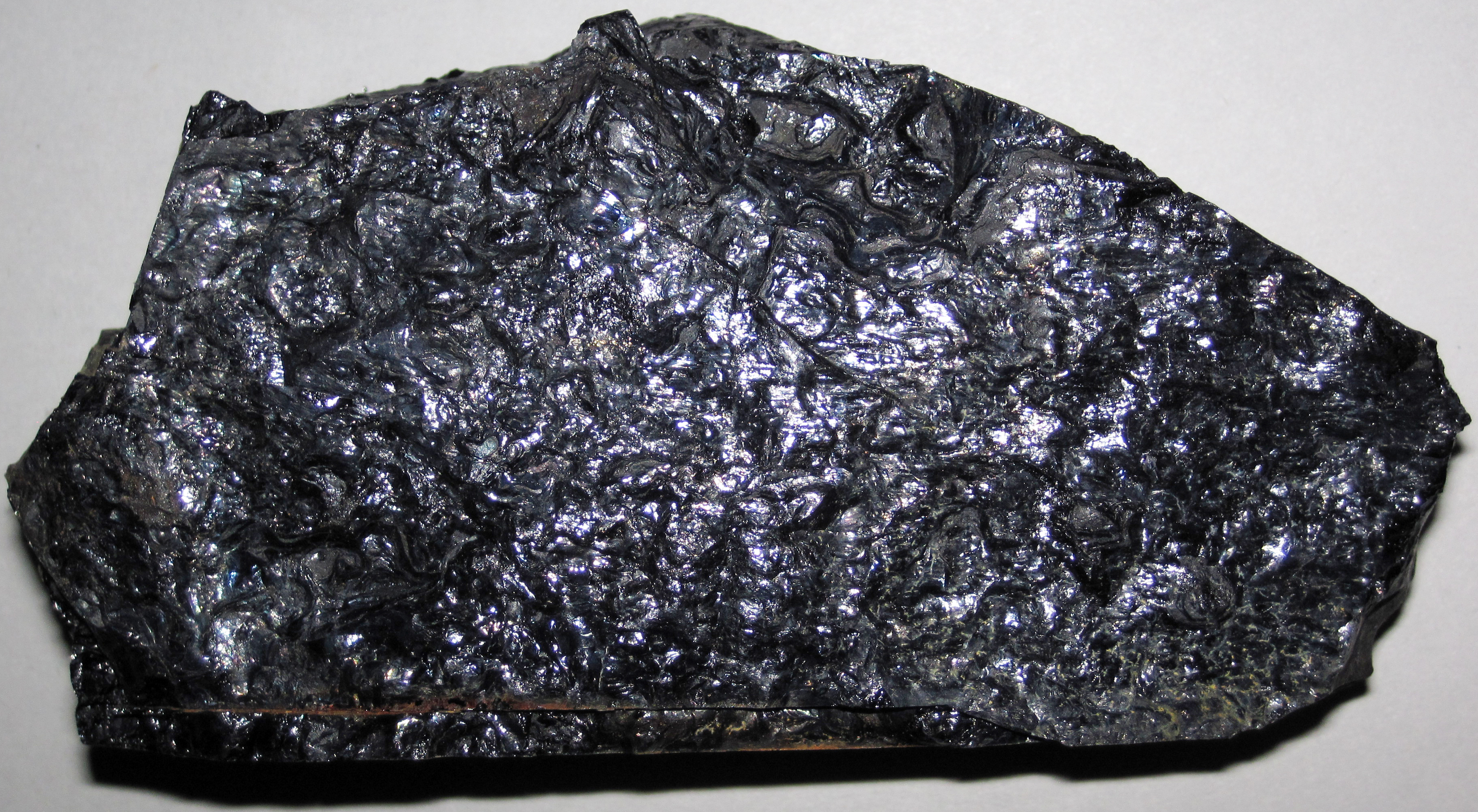
- Coal from the Monongahela Formation
- Type: Group in Ohio, Pennsylvania, parts of West Virginia and Maryland, sometimes also seen as Formation
- Sub-units: Uniontown Formation Waynesburg Coal (No 11. Coal) Gilboy Sandstone Member Little Waynesburg Coal Waynesburg Limestone Member Uniontown Sandstone Member Annabelle Shale Member Uniontown Coal (No. 10 Coal) Uniontown Limestone Member "Great Lime" Fulton Shale Member Pittsburgh Formation Benwood Limestone Member Upper Sewickley Coal Upper Sewickley Sandstone Member Sewickley (Meigis Creek) Coal (No. 9 Coal) Lower Sewickley Sanstone Member Sewickley Limestone Member Cedarville Sanstone Member Redstone-Pomeroy coal (No 8a. Coal) Westone Sanstone Member Pittsburgh coal seam (No 8. Coal)
- Underlies: Washington Formation
- Overlies: Conemaugh Group

Location
- Region: West Virginia, Pennsylvania, Ohio, Maryland
- Country: United States

The Monongahela Formation is a geologic formation in West Virginia, Pennsylvania, Ohio, and Maryland. It is dated to the Carboniferous period. The top of the group is marked by the Waynesburg Coal (No. 11 Coal) and its base is marked by the Pittsburgh coal seam (No. 8 Coal). The Pittsburgh coal is the thickest and most extensive (11,000 sq mi) bituminous coal bed in the Appalachian Basin
