= Conemaugh Group =

Geologic group in the eastern United States

- Stratigraphic range: Pennsylvanian
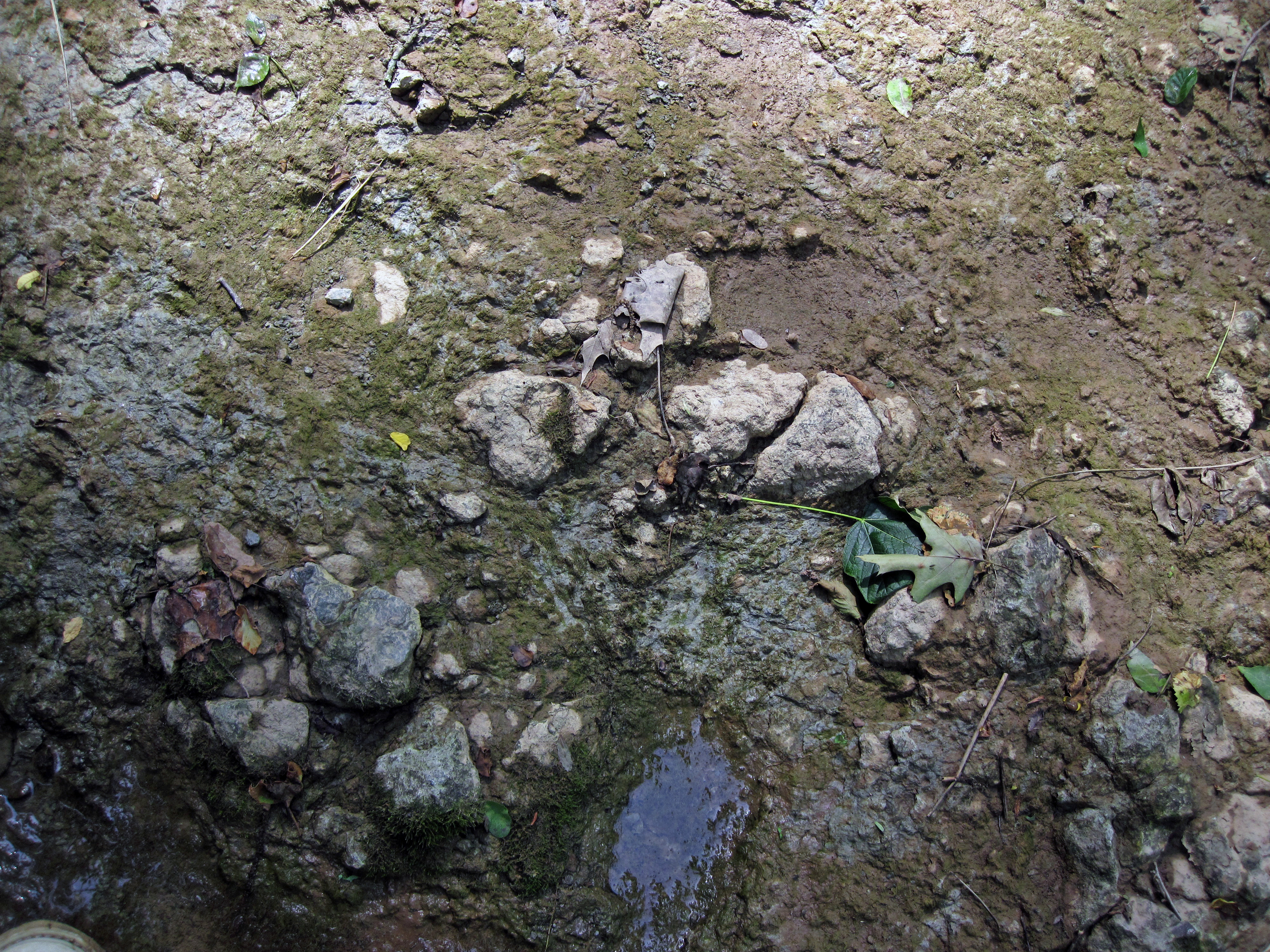
- Pedogenic breccia (Conemaugh Group, Upper Pennsylvanian)
- Type: Group
- Sub-units: Casselman Formation, Glenshaw Formation, Birmingham Shale, Skelley Member
- Underlies: Monongahela Group
- Overlies: Allegheny Formation

Location
- Region: West Virginia, Pennsylvania, Ohio, Maryland
- Country: United States

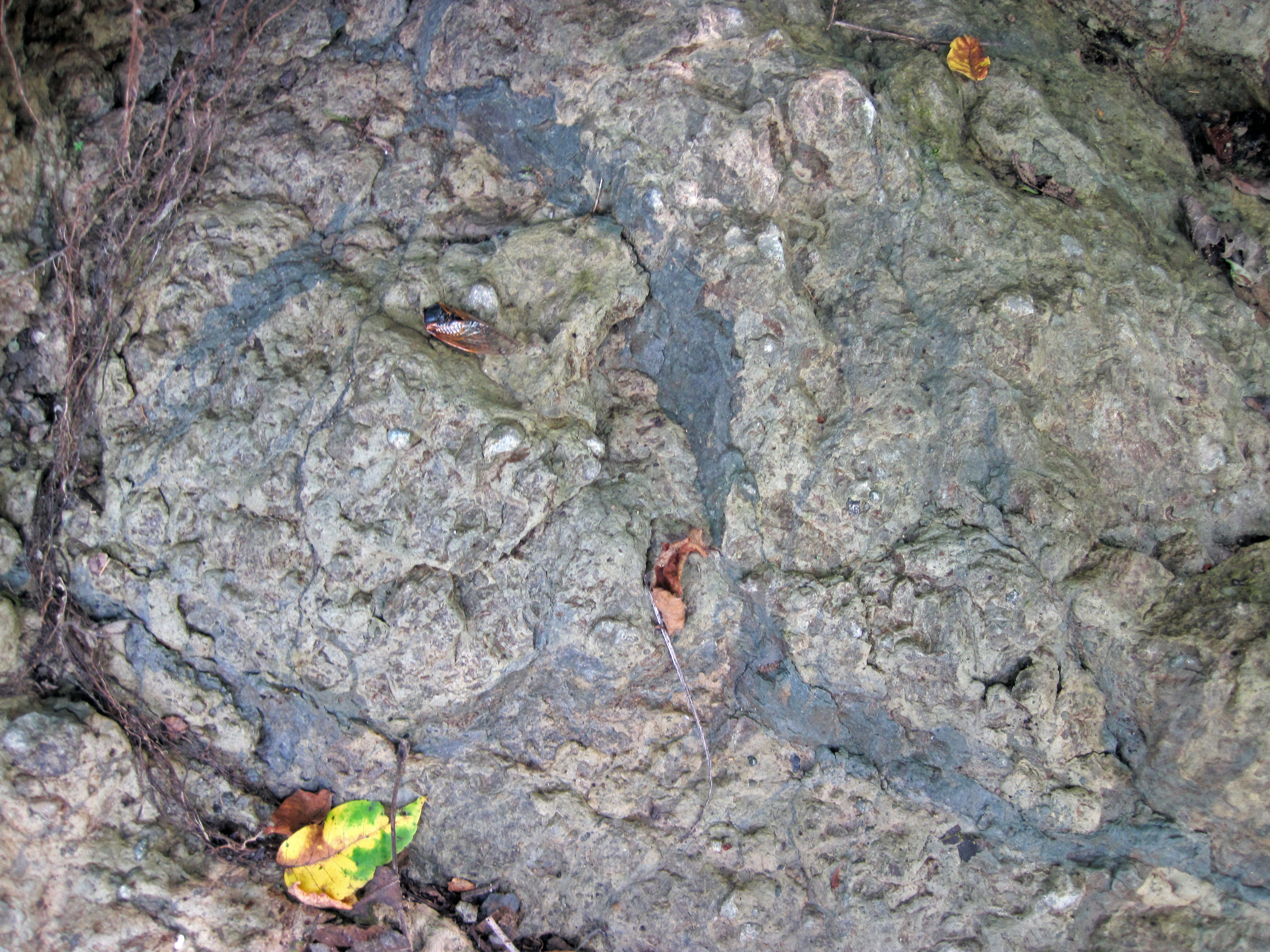
Clay dikes in pedogenic breccia (Conemaugh Group; Caldwell, Ohio)

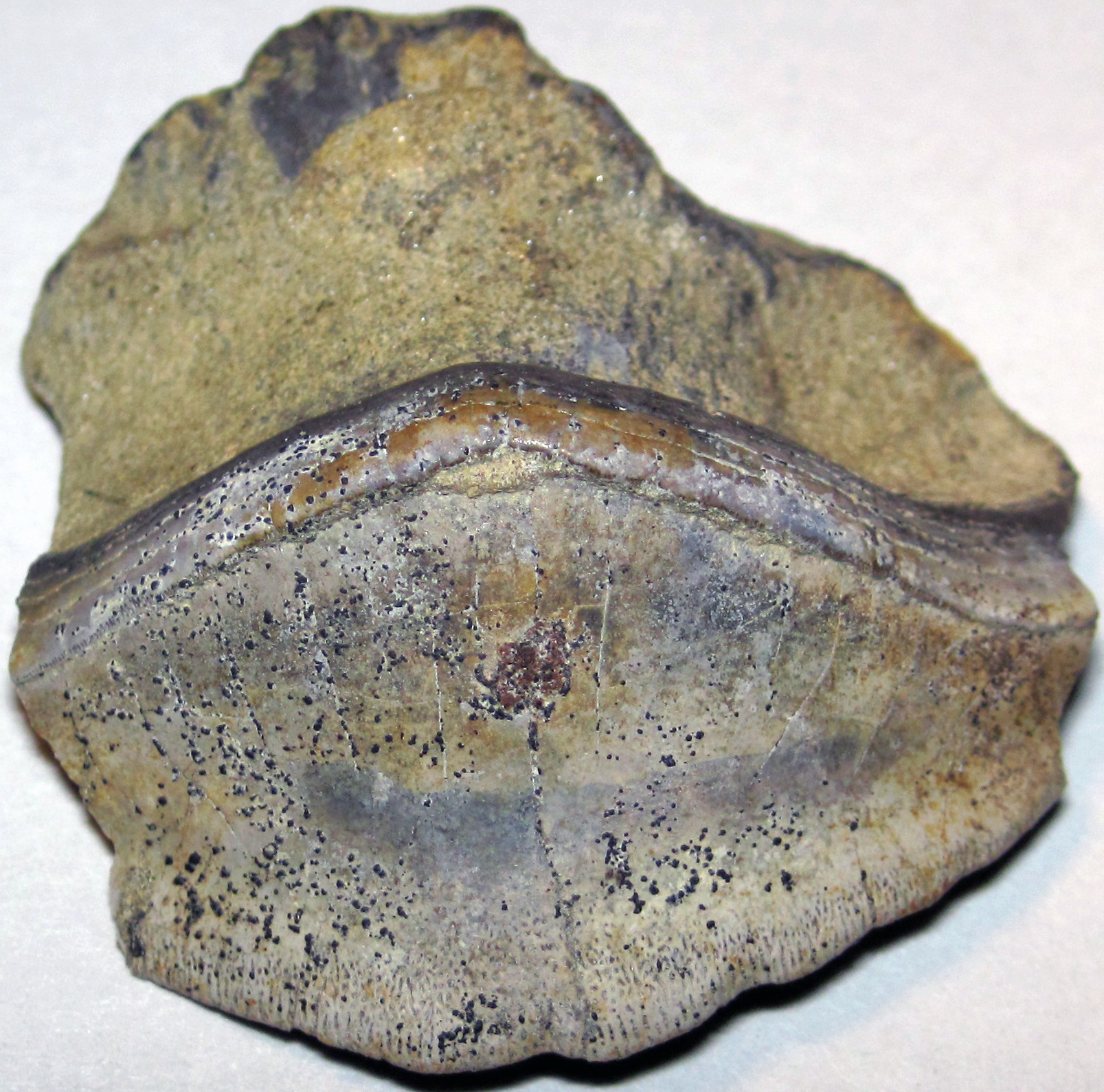
Petalodus ohioensis (fossil shark tooth) (Skelley Member; Noble County, Ohio)

The Conemaugh Group is a geologic group in West Virginia, Pennsylvania, Ohio, and Maryland. It preserves fossils dating back to the Carboniferous period.

== See also ==
- List of fossiliferous stratigraphic units in West Virginia
