= Paleontology in Pennsylvania =

Paleontological research in the U.S. state of Pennsylvania

The location of Pennsylvania

Paleontology in Pennsylvania refers to paleontological research occurring within or conducted by people from the U.S. state of Pennsylvania. The geologic column of Pennsylvania spans from the Precambrian to Quaternary. During the early part of the Paleozoic, Pennsylvania was submerged by a warm, shallow sea. This sea would come to be inhabited by creatures like brachiopods, bryozoans, crinoids, graptolites, and trilobites. The armored fish Palaeaspis appeared during the Silurian. By the Devonian the state was home to other kinds of fishes. On land, some of the world's oldest tetrapods left behind footprints that would later fossilize. Some of Pennsylvania's most important fossil finds were made in the state's Devonian rocks. Carboniferous Pennsylvania was a swampy environment covered by a wide variety of plants. The latter half of the period was called the Pennsylvanian in honor of the state's rich contemporary rock record. By the end of the Paleozoic the state was no longer so swampy. During the Mesozoic the state was home to dinosaurs and other kinds of reptiles, who left behind fossil footprints. Little is known about the early to mid Cenozoic of Pennsylvania, but during the Ice Age it seemed to have a tundra-like environment. Local Delaware people used to smoke mixtures of fossil bones and tobacco for good luck and to have wishes granted. By the late 1800s Pennsylvania was the site of formal scientific investigation of fossils. Around this time Hadrosaurus foulkii of neighboring New Jersey became the first mounted dinosaur skeleton exhibit at the Academy of Natural Sciences in Philadelphia. The Devonian trilobite Phacops rana is the Pennsylvania state fossil.

== Prehistory ==
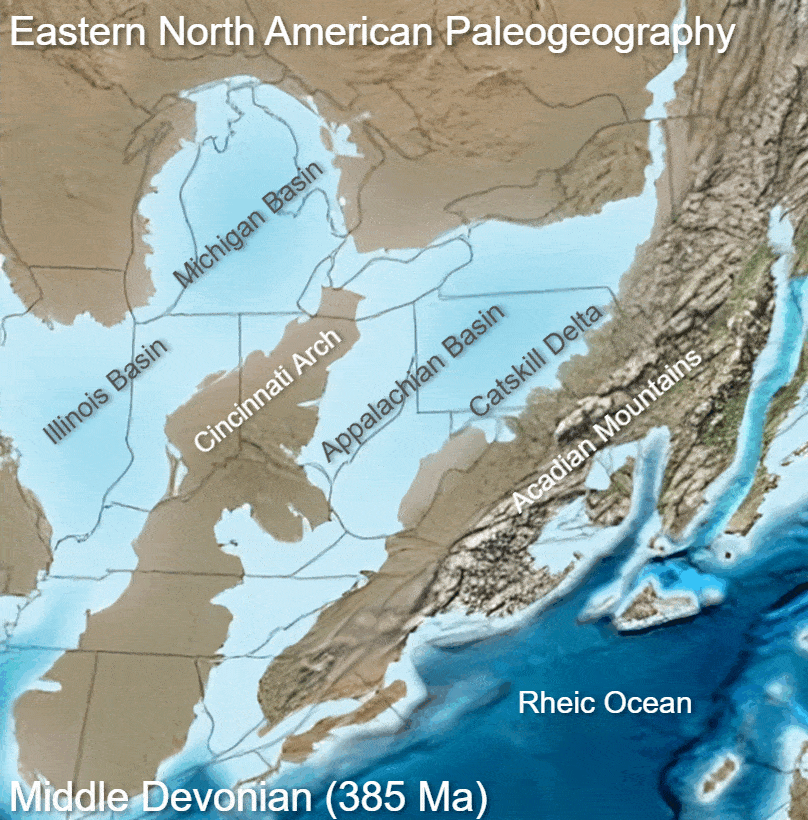
Paleogeographic reconstruction showing the Appalachian Basin area during the Middle Devonian period.

No Precambrian fossils are known from Pennsylvania. As such, the state's fossil record does not begin until the Paleozoic. During the early part of the Paleozoic, Pennsylvania was located near the eastern coast of a continent called Laurentia. Much of the nearby sea covered the state. During the Late Ordovician Pennsylvania was home to brachiopods, bryozoans, crinoids, graptolites, mollusks, pelecypods, starfish, and trilobites. During the following Silurian Period, the fish Palaeapsis bitruncata left remains in Perry County.

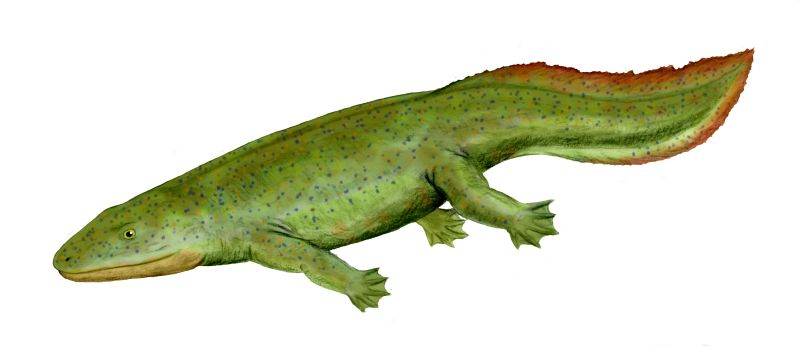
Hynerpeton.

Devonian tetrapods left footprints near Warren in what was once regarded as the oldest evidence for a terrestrial vertebrate, although more recent finds of footprints from Poland currently hold the record. Later Devonian strata preserve primitive fishes and more evidence for early tetrapods. One important fossil site called Red Hill is found along a road cut in Clinton County. It preserves evidence of a floodplain environment that was dominated by the plant Archaeopteris. The early tetrapod Hynerpeton, an important transitional fossil, was described from Red Hill.

The name of the following period, the Carboniferous means "coal-bearing". This period has been nicknamed the "age of amphibians" or the "age of coal swamps". During the Carboniferous period Laurentia joined with another continent called Gondwana. The combined supercontinent is called Pangaea. Also at this time, seawater withdrew from the state. During the Mississippian, a primitive tetrapod left tracks in the Pottsville area. A series of swamps formed where the sea once was. The late Carboniferous Pennsylvanian flora of Pennsylvania included Annularia, Cordaites, Diplothemema, Mariopteris, Neuropteris, Odontopteris, possible Pecopteris orenulata, Pecopteris pennaeformis, Pecopteris plumosa, Sphenophyllum, and possible Sphenopteris. However, the swamps bearing these plants would dry up before the end of the Paleozoic era. A gap in the rock record spans the remainder of the Paleozoic after the end of the Carboniferous because local sediments were being eroded away faster than they were being deposited.

During the Mesozoic, Pangaea began to break apart. The geological forces responsible for the breakup formed large rift valleys in the eastern part of the state. These areas of Pennsylvania were covered in huge lakes during the Late Triassic.

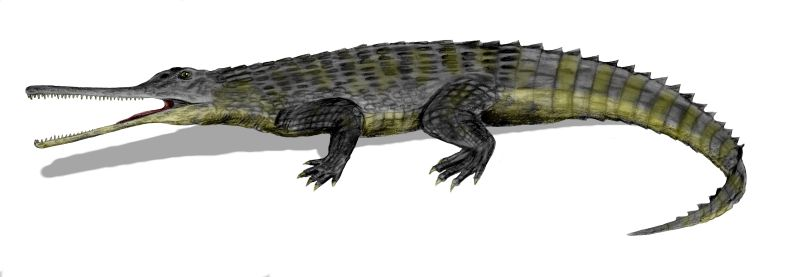
Rutiodon.

Many dinosaur tracks have been discovered in Pennsylvania. Atreipus tracks are known from the Late Triassic Lockatong Formation in Arcola, Gratersford, and Gwynnedd. Grallator tracks have been discovered in the Late Triassic Passaic Formation in Schwenksville. Atreipus tracks are known from the same formation in Gratersford. Ancient crocodilians have left fossils. A genus referred to as Galtonia gibbidens left behind some teeth in the Emigsville area. Rutiodon fossils were preserved in York County along the Little Conewago Creek. Also near Emigsville, two metoposaurs were preserved in what is now a copper mine.

There are few if any rocks from the ensuing Tertiary period of the Cenozoic era in Pennsylvania's geologic record. However, during the Pleistocene, glaciers covered much of the state. Those areas left uncovered formed a tundra dotted with sedges and willows. A fairly complete mastodon was recovered in Marshalls Creek and is currently on display at the state museum.

== History ==
=== Indigenous interpretations ===
One legend told among the Delaware Indians describes the discovery of a fragment of bone left by a monster that had once been killing people near modern Philadelphia in either Pennsylvania or eastern New Jersey. When the hunting party brought the piece of bone back to the village, a wise man encouraged them to set out and find more of the monsters remains. He said that smoking fragments of the bone with tobacco in a small clay spoon could grant wishes like good health for one's children, longevity, or successful hunting. The area where the Delaware hunters supposedly found the ancient bones is the same general region as the earliest dinosaur discoveries in North America. Local dinosaurs include ankylosaurs, Coelosaurus, Dryptosaurus, and Hadrosaurus. Other local reptile fossils include crocodilians and Tylosaurus. This legend likely predates European contact and may have originated prior to 1500. The bones being burnt in the "clay spoon" is a reference to a primitive kind of clay pipe that the local people had abandoned in favor of a design with a deeper bowl by the 17th century. The general lack of any sign of influence by European culture on the tale is also suggestive of its great antiquity.

=== Scientific research ===
One of the earliest notable events in Pennsylvania paleontology was the October 5th, 1787 presentation by Caspar Wistar and Timothy Matlack of a probable dinosaur metatarsal discovered in Late Cretaceous rocks near Woodbury Creek in New Jersey as "'a large thigh bone'" to the American Philosophical Society in Philadelphia. During the Industrial Revolution, Carboniferous-aged coal deposits in Pennsylvania were the sites of serendipitous discoveries of early fossil tetrapod trackways. Such discoveries generally occur when the excavation of coal mines removes the rock underlying the trackway, leaving it exposed on the tunnel's ceiling. Later, during the 1840s, Charles Lyell examined some local purported fossil bird and mammal tracks and found that they were actually petroglyphs left by local indigenous people. Depictions of trace fossils in indigenous rock art are known from throughout North America.

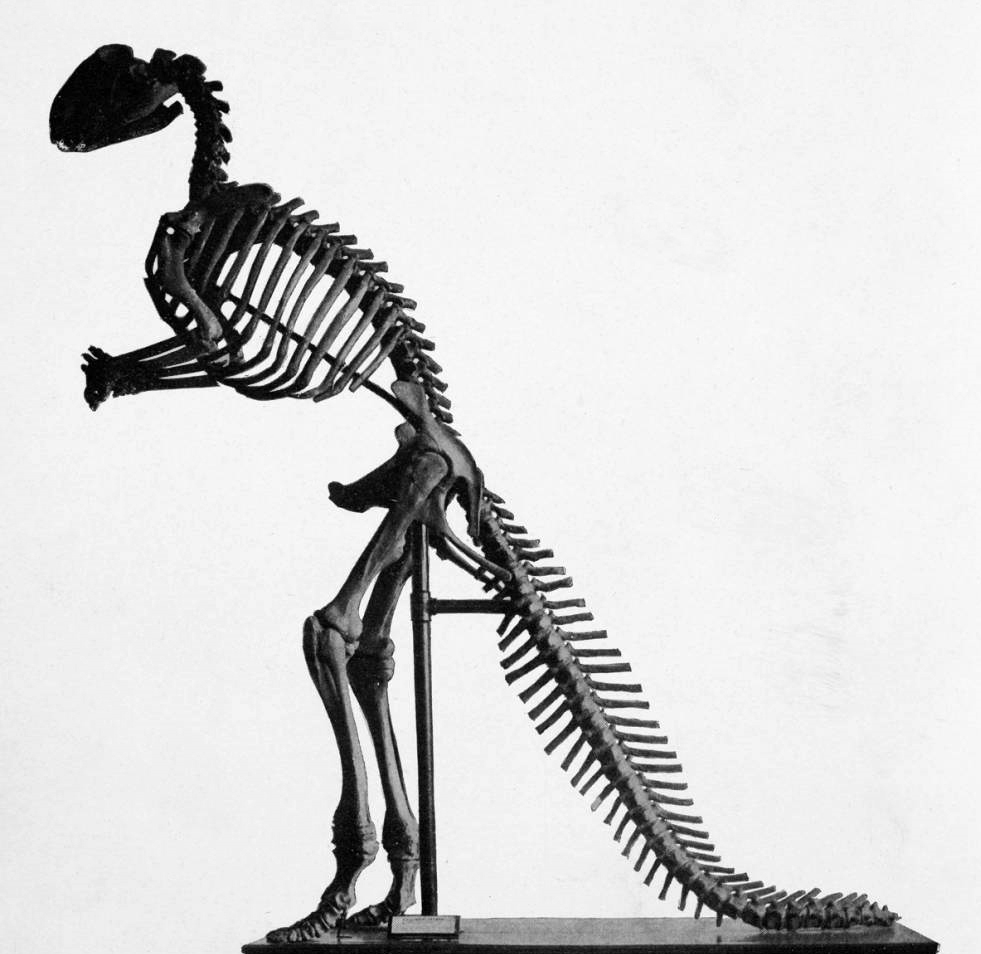
Benjamin Waterhouse Hawkins' mounted Hadrosaurus, the first mounted dinosaur skeleton in the world.

In 1868 Joseph Leidy worked with artist Benjamin Waterhouse Hawkins to mount Hadrosaurus foulkii for the Academy of Natural Sciences of Philadelphia. This became both the first mounted dinosaur skeleton ever mounted for public display but also one of the most popular exhibits in the history of the academy. Estimates have the Hadrosaurus exhibit as increasing the number of visitors by up to 50%. In 1878 Edward Drinker Cope described two dinosaur teeth as belonging to Thecodontosaurus gibbidens. These are the only known dinosaur skeletal remains from Pennsylvania. 1889 Dinosaur tracks were discovered at a small quarry near Goldsboro in York County. These prints were of the ichnogenus Atreipus and preserved in the Late Triassic Gettysburg Formation. Near the end of the 19th century, in 1895, Andrew Carnegie endowed Pittsburgh's Carnegie Museum.

One of the first major fossil finds of the 20th century in Pennsylvania was the 1902 discovery of dinosaur tracks at a fisher's Quarry near Graterford in Montgomery County. Another prominent early 1900s discovery was a lower jaw from the amphibian Calamops was discovered in the Late Triassic Stockton Formation at Holicong. This is the oldest vertebrate fossil from either the Hartford or Newark Basins. In 1923 the Reading Railroad tunnel at Gwynned was converted into an open cut, exposing many Late Triassic fossils. Later, in 1933, two Anchisauripus tracks were discovered near Yocumtown in York County. Dinosaur tracks dating back to the Late Triassic were discovered near the Gettysburg battle sites in 1933.

Bradford Willard of the Pennsylvania Topographic and Geologic Survey discovered a dinosaur footprint in 1934 near New Cumberland while Route 111 was being widened. The track was associated with fern impressions, mudcracks, and raindrop impressions. Dinosaur tracks dating back to the Late Triassic were discovered near the Gettysburg battle sites in 1937. A contemporary news account describes the tracks as being about six inches long being left by animals with a thirty-inch stride length. Some of the tracks were left by chicken-sized individuals. That same year, Elmer R. Haile Jr. collected Late Triassic fossil footprints from the Trostle Quarry near York Springs in Adams County. Among the finds were the dinosaur ichnogenus Atreipus and other reptile ichnogenera like Brachychirotherium and Rhynchosauroides. Another major 1937 discovery was the Atreipus prints found in the Late Triassic Gettysburg Formation rock at York Springs. One of the last major discoveries of the 1930s in Pennsylvania paleontology was the 1939 discovery by Earl L. Poole of a large assemblage of Late Triassic fossil reptile footprints near Perkiomen Creek at a quarry where rock was being excavated for highway material. This site is now known as the Squirrel Hill Quarry.[64] A contemporary newspaper article described the find as including dozens of tracks left by chicken sized animals, about 6 left by a turkey sized one, and a single track left by one about the weight of a horse.

Early in the mid-twentieth century came the 1952 Whilhelm Bock referred some of the Squirrel Hill footprints to the dinosaur ichnogenus Grallator, while the other reptile tracks he didn't think were dinosaurian. That same year Bock described the new ichnospecies Anchisauripus gwynnedensis from Late Triassic rocks exposed at the Reading Railroad at Gwynned. In 1988, the Devonian trilobite Phacops rana was designated the Pennsylvania state fossil. In 1994, the teeth originally designated Thecodontosaurus gibbidens by Cope were renamed Galtonia gibbidens.

== People ==
=== Births ===
- Edward Drinker Cope was born in Philadelphia on July 28, 1840.
- Childs Frick was born in Pittsburgh in 1883.
- William More Gabb was born in Philadelphia on January 16, 1839.
- Joseph Leidy was born in Philadelphia on September 9, 1823.
- Paul S. Martin was born in Allentown in 1928.

=== Deaths ===
- Edward Drinker Cope died in Philadelphia on April 12, 1897, at age 56.
- William More Gabb died in Philadelphia on May 30, 1878.
- Joseph Leidy died in Philadelphia on April 30, 1891, at age 67.
- Charles M. Wheatley died in Phoenixville on May 6, 1882, at age 60.

== Natural history museums ==
- Academy of Natural Sciences, Philadelphia
- Carnegie Museum of Natural History, Pittsburgh
- Delaware County Institute of Science, Media
- Earth & Mineral Sciences Museum and Art Gallery, University Park, State College
- Everhart Museum, Scranton
- North Museum of Natural History and Science, Lancaster
- State Museum of Pennsylvania, Harrisburg
- Reading Public Museum, West Reading
- Wagner Free Institute of Science, Philadelphia

== Notable clubs and associations ==
- Delaware Valley Paleontological Society

== See also ==
- Paleontology in Maryland
- Paleontology in New Jersey
- Paleontology in New York
- Paleontology in Ohio
- Paleontology in West Virginia
