= List of mapped rock formations in Pennsylvania =

The following is a list of the mapped bedrock units in Pennsylvania. The rocks are listed in stratigraphic order.

System	Group name	Formation name	Member name	Map symbol
Triassic	Newark Group	Passaic Formation		Trp
Triassic	Newark Group	Lockatong Formation		Trl
Triassic	Newark Group	Stockton Formation		Trs
Permian	Dunkard Group	Greene Formation		Pg
Permian	Dunkard Group	Washington Formation		Pw
Pennsylvanian	Conemaugh Group	Casselman Formation		φcc
Pennsylvanian	Conemaugh Group	Glenshaw Formation		φcg
Pennsylvanian		Allegheny Formation		φa
Pennsylvanian		Llewellyn Formation		φl
Pennsylvanian		Pottsville Formation		φp
Mississippian		Mauch Chunk Formation		Mmc
Mississippian		Pocono Formation (Burgoon Formation)		Mp (Mb)
Mississippian/Devonian		Spechty Kopf Formation		
Mississippian/Devonian		Rockwell Formation		
Mississippian/Devonian		Huntley Mountain Formation		
Devonian		Catskill Formation		Dck
Devonian		Brallier Formation		Db
Devonian		Harrell Formation		Dh
Devonian	Hamilton Group	Mahantango Formation		Dmh
Devonian	Hamilton Group	Marcellus Formation		Dm
Devonian		Onondaga Formation		Do
Devonian		Old Port Formation		Dop
Devonian		Old Port Formation	Ridgeley Member	Dr
Devonian/Silurian		Keyser Formation		DSk
Silurian		Tonoloway Formation		Sto
Silurian		Wills Creek Formation		Swc
Silurian		Bloomsburg Formation		Sb
Silurian		Mifflintown Formation		Sm
Silurian	Clinton Group	Keefer Formation		Sk
Silurian	Clinton Group	Rose Hill Formation		Srh
Silurian		Tuscarora Formation		St
Silurian		Shawangunk Formation		Ss
Ordovician		Juniata Formation		Oj
Ordovician		Bald Eagle Formation		Obe
Ordovician		Reedsville Formation		Or
Ordovician		Martinsburg Formation		Om
Ordovician	Trenton Group	Coburn Formation		
Ordovician	Trenton Group	Salona Formation		
Ordovician	Trenton Group	Nealmont Formation		
Ordovician		Benner Formation		Om
Ordovician		Bellefonte Formation		Obf
Ordovician		Axeman Formation		Oa
Ordovician		Nittany Formation		On
Ordovician		Stonehenge/Larke Formation		Osl
Cambrian		Warrior Formation		Cw
Cambrian		Chickies Formation		Cch
Cambrian/Ediacaran		Wissahickon Formation		CZw
Mesoproterozoic Era		Baltimore Gneiss		Ybg

Note: Some of the Formations are laterally equivalent in age. They are listed in order from West to East in this case.

== See also ==
- Geology of Pennsylvania
