= Bald Eagle Mountain =

Mountain in central Pennsylvania, US

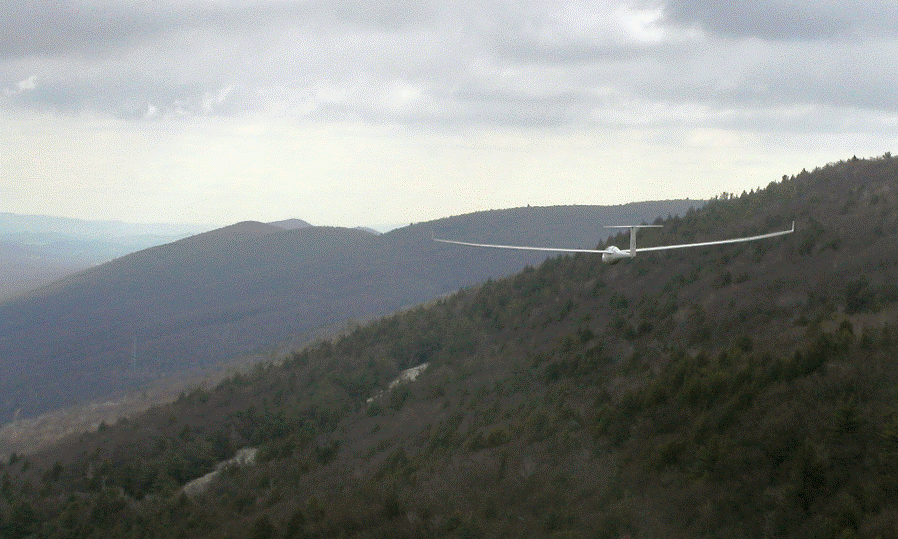
- A Scimitar glider ridge soaring on Bald Eagle Mountain near Lock Haven, Pennsylvania

Highest point
- Elevation: 2,112 ft (644 m)
- Coordinates: 41°07′36″N 77°21′04″W

Geography
- Location within Pennsylvania
- Location: Pennsylvania, U.S.
- Parent range: Appalachian Mountains
- Topo map: USGS Jersey Shore (PA) Quadrangle

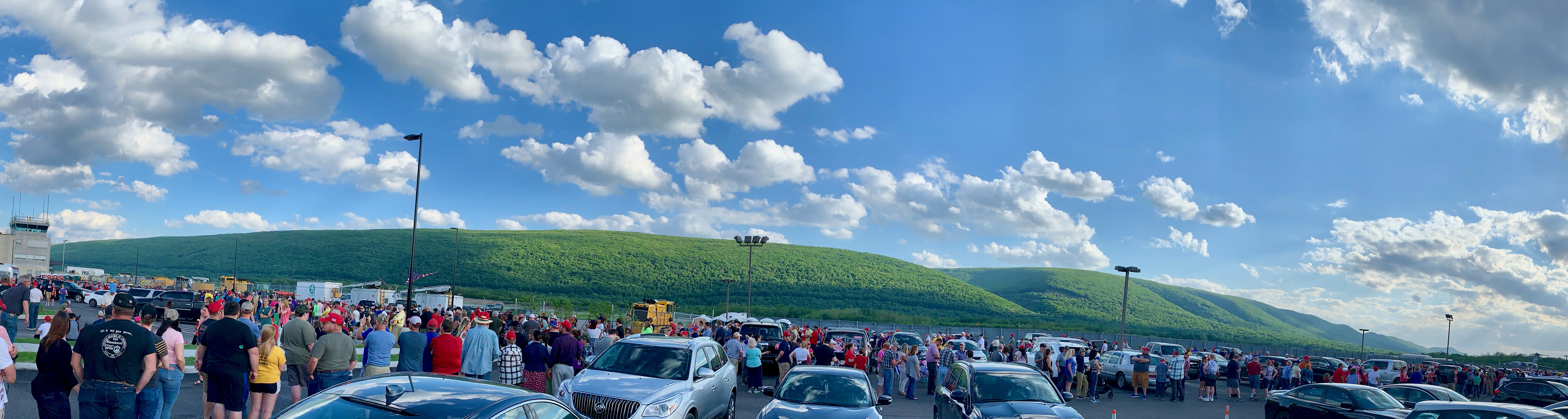
Bald Eagle Mountain in Lycoming County shown in May 2019

Bald Eagle Mountain – once known locally as Muncy Mountain – is a stratigraphic ridge in the Ridge-and-Valley Appalachians of central Pennsylvania, United States, running east of the Allegheny Front and northwest of Mount Nittany. It lies along the southeast side of Bald Eagle Creek and south of the West Branch Susquehanna River, and is the westernmost ridge in its section of the Ridge-and-Valley Appalachians. The ridge line separates the West Branch Susquehanna Valley from the Nippenose and White Deer Hole valleys, and Bald Eagle Valley from Nittany Valley.

Bald Eagle Mountain lies in the central portion of Centre County, the southern portion of Clinton County, and the southern portion of Lycoming County, and the ridge line forms part of the border between Blair County and Huntingdon County. It runs from the water gap formed with Brush Mountain by the Little Juniata River at Tyrone, to the bend in the West Branch Susquehanna River just east of Williamsport, a distance of approximately 60 miles (97 km).

The Julian and Unionville Pikes are paved roads that cross the ridge near State College, along with U.S. Route 322 and Interstate 99 which pass through the now enlarged wind gap known at Skytop. Most other major road crossings are through water gaps, including Interstate 80 which passes through Curtin Gap east of Milesburg. Other water gaps in the ridge are formed by Spring Creek on the south edge of Milesburg and by Fishing Creek at Mill Hall (where U.S. Route 220 crosses). U.S. Route 15 crosses through a wind gap south of Williamsport near Bald Eagle Mountain's eastern end.

Bald Eagle Ridge is popular with soaring birds and glider pilots ridge soaring along its slopes. This ridge is part of a chain of ridges that stretch southwest to Tennessee. It is one of the best sites in the eastern United States for viewing the migration of the golden eagle. The Ridge Soaring Gliderport lies at the foot of this ridge between Julian and Unionville.

A mature oak and hickory forest covers Bald Eagle Mountain.

== Geology ==
Bald Eagle Mountain is in the western part of the Ridge and Valley province of the Appalachian Mountains. Brush Mountain and the neighboring Nittany Mountain and Tussey Mountain ridges are part of the same Paleozoic anticline, the limbs of which consist of the older Ordovician Bald Eagle Formation (sandstone), Juniata Formation (interbedded sandstone and shale), and younger Silurian Tuscarora Formation (dominantly quartzite).

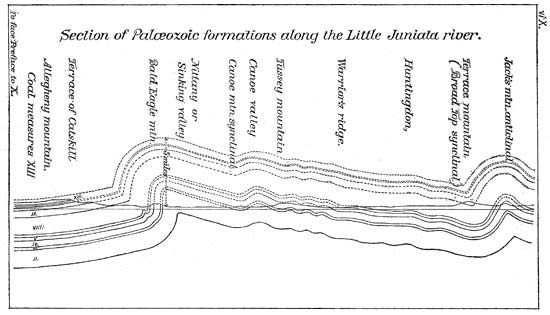
Geologic cross section along the Little Juniata River

During the Alleghanian orogeny, these layers folded up with the underlying and overlying layers into the Nittany Arch. The arch was a Himalayan-scale mountain that towered above what is now Nittany Valley, where the oldest rock layers from deep within the eroded mountain are now exposed. Younger rocks from the outer layers of the arch are exposed on the west side of the ridge in the Bald Eagle Valley, with the youngest across the valley at the foot of the Allegheny Front. These sedimentary rock layers were tipped almost vertical on the side of the ancient mountain where Bald Eagle Mountain now lies.

The Tuscarora Quartzite is more resistant to erosion than Bald Eagle sandstone, and both are more durable than the Juniata Shale sandwiched in between. Softer rock layers on either side of these eroded, leaving the double crested Bald Eagle Mountain ridge, with a depression between the higher western and slightly lower eastern ridge lines. On the neighboring ridges that formed the opposite slope of the ancient mountain, the same three rock layers are exposed in reverse order, with the oldest rocks near the hinge of the fold. Since the rock layers on these ridges are not vertical, the Tuscarora Formation underlies a much higher crest, and the Bald Eagle Formation creates a series of lower "terraces" broken by small ravines.

The southeast slope of the ridge is underlaid by Juniata Formation sandstone. The northwest slope of the ridge, where the rock layers are near vertical, exposes a series of rock layers, from summit to foot, or older to younger: Clinton Group sandstone and shale, Mifflintown Formation shale and limestone, Bloomsburg Formation shale, siltstone, sandstone, and mudstone, Wills Creek Formation shale, siltstone, limestone, and dolomite, Tonoloway Formation limestone, Keyser Formation limestone, Old Port Formation Shriver chert, Mandata shale, Corriganville chert, New Creek limestone and Ridgeley Member sandstone, and Onondaga Formation calcareous shale.

The Bald Eagle sandstone is laced with pyrite veins, and when exposed to air and water, these minerals produce sulfuric acid, contaminating both surface runoff and groundwater. Construction of Interstate 99 where it crosses Bald Eagle Mountain has been delayed since 2004 by complaints from the Pennsylvania Department of Environmental Protection about acidic runoff from pyritic rock excavated from this formation. The planned I-99/I-80 interchange further north in the Nittany Valley at the foot of the ridge was redesigned to avoid excavating contaminated rock from the same formation.

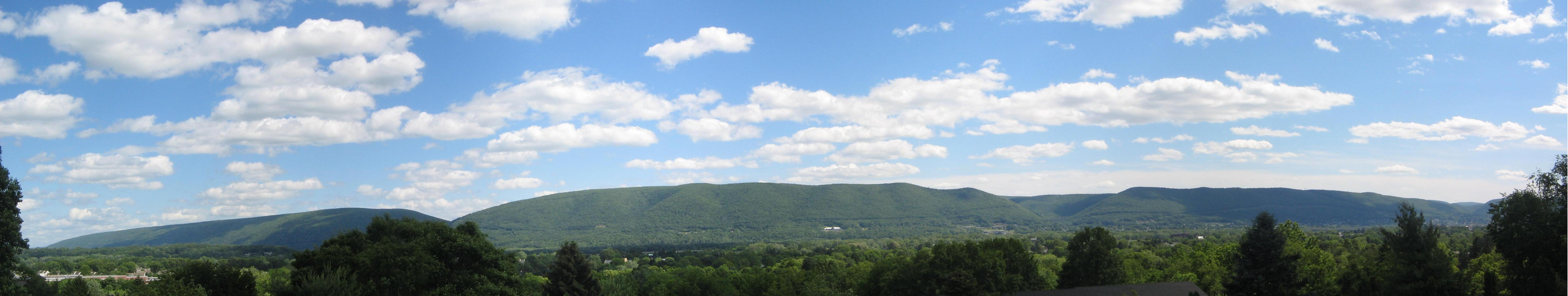
Bald Eagle Mountain, looking south from a hill in Loyalsock Township just east of Williamsport in Lycoming County. The eastern end of the mountain is at far left, with the wind gap where US Route 15 crosses it at the middle left and the water gap from Hagermans Run above South Williamsport at middle right.

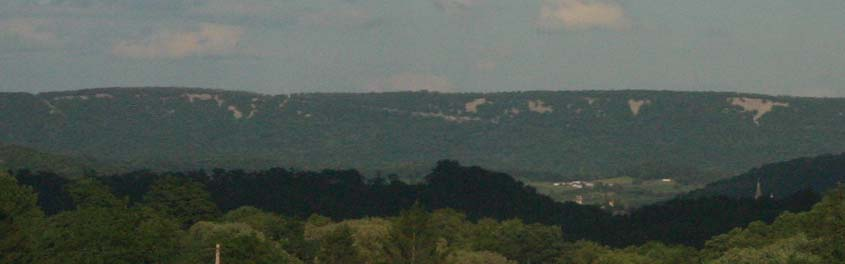
Gray areas are periglacial boulder fields on the mountainside in this view facing east

== See also ==
- List of mountains of the Alleghenies
