= Geology of New York (state) =

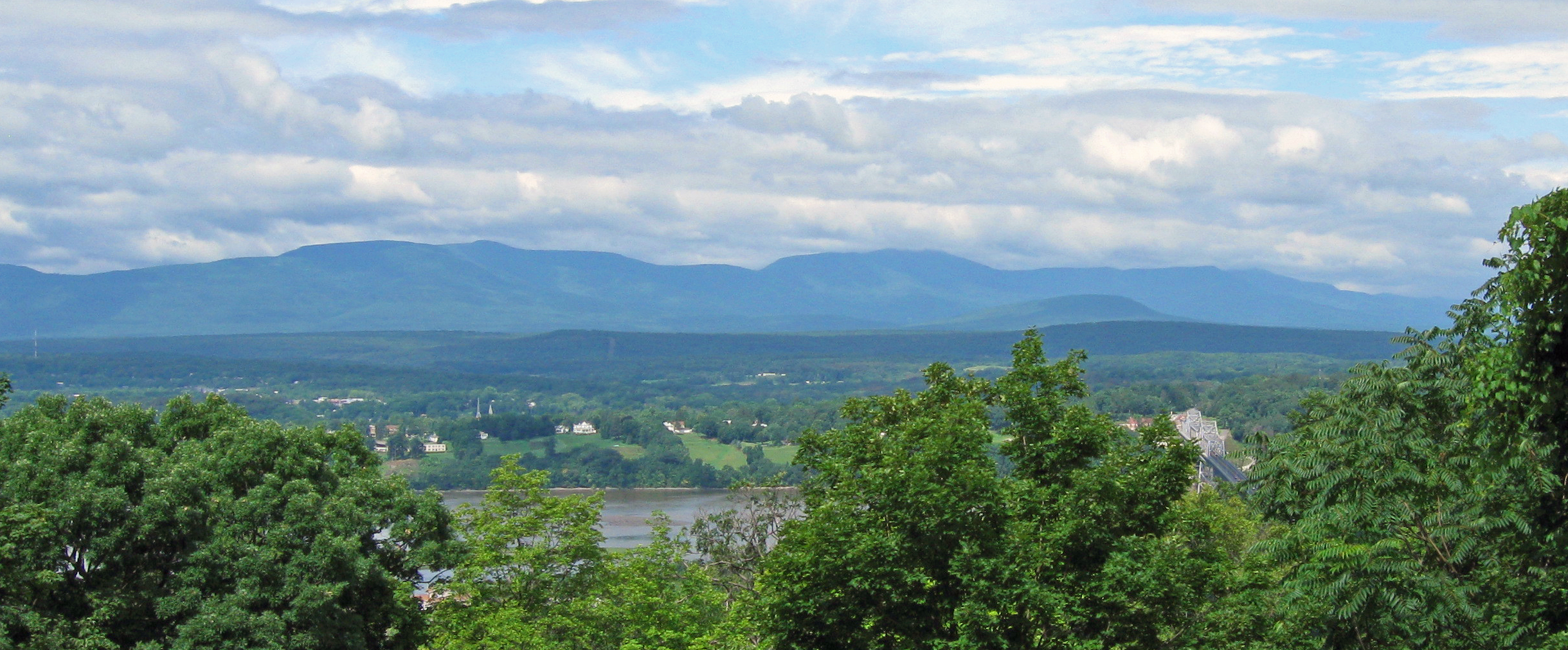
Catskill Escarpment from Olana State Historic Site across Hudson River

The geology of the State of New York is made up of ancient Precambrian crystalline basement rock, forming the Adirondack Mountains and the bedrock of much of the state. These rocks experienced numerous deformations during mountain building events and much of the region was flooded by shallow seas depositing thick sequences of sedimentary rock during the Paleozoic. Fewer rocks have deposited since the Mesozoic as several kilometers of rock have eroded into the continental shelf and Atlantic coastal plain, although volcanic and sedimentary rocks in the Newark Basin are a prominent fossil-bearing feature near New York City from the Mesozoic rifting of the supercontinent Pangea.

== Stratigraphy, tectonics and geologic history ==
The igneous and metamorphic crystalline basement rock of New York formed in the Precambrian and are coterminous with the Canadian Shield. The Adirondack Mountains, Thousand Islands, Hudson Highlands, and Fordham gneiss, along with outcrops in the Berkshires just over the state line in Massachusetts, are part of the Grenville Province, a large piece of continental crust which accreted to the Canadian Shield and underlies much of Quebec, Ontario as far west as Lake Huron and as far east as Labrador. These rocks date to 1.3 to 1.1 billion years ago in the Proterozoic and formed from lime mud, sand and clay on coastal barrier islands as well as evaporites in intervening lagoons.

The Avalonian mountain building event 575 million years ago in the Neoproterozoic is poorly understood but deformed and metamorphosed the Hudson Highlands and Manhattan Prong.

=== Paleozoic (539-251 million years ago) ===
New York constituted a continental margin in the Paleozoic as multi-cellular life became common. As the proto-Atlantic Ocean opened, a marine transgression in the Cambrian and Ordovician flooded much of the region, with the Potsdam Sea transgressing westward.

A reversal in mantle convection currents around 445 million years ago, in the Middle Ordovician, launched the Taconic orogeny and closed the Iapetus Ocean. Crustal shortening caused a large section of continental crust in the west to thrust beneath the crust to the east, resulting in partial melting and the creation of an island arc. This complex tectonic situation produced intense folding, fracturing, thrust faults and large landslides which are now preserved in the Taconic Mountains. It also led to the intrusion of the Cortlandt and Croton Falls igneous complexes, in the vicinity of Peekskill.

The current day Taconic Mountains are the stubs of towering ancient mountains, as evidenced by high-pressure metamorphism indicating that extant rocks were buried under miles of overburden, which subsequently eroded. The sedimentation pattern changed from gradual deposition toward the east to much more rapid sedimentation to the west, filling in the Queenston Delta from the late Ordovician onward into a shallow sea. At the end of the Taconic orogeny, an unconformity appears with the uplift and erosion of the massive delta.

In the Silurian and Devonian, new sediments covered the erosional surface, beginning with the white quartz pebbles of the Shawangunk conglomerate. Crustal stretching created a series horst and graben features, which remain in the Adirondacks as well as in the Mohawk, Hudson and Champlain areas. Down-dropped grabens preserved Ordovician rock from erosion.

Between 375 and 335 million years ago, the proto-Atlantic Ocean closed, forming the supercontinent Pangaea. The Acadian orogeny formed a massive range, much taller than the heavily eroded Taconics further to the east. Rocks in what is now eastern New York as far west as the Adirondacks was "overprinted" with new mineral assemblages forming due to deformation that had begun in the Taconic orogeny.

The newly formed mountains rapidly eroded and shed sediments, even as uplift continued. A massive apron of sediment formed the Catskill Delta to the westward, burying much of the Taconics and filling in a shallow sea. The Catskill Mountains formed through erosion of the debris field from the Acadian mountains.

The Peekskill granite intruded after the orogeny, in Westchester County, between 335 and 320 million years ago. Around 250 million years ago, the final Appalachian mountain orogeny, the Alleghanian orogeny occurred. Geologists debate whether gentle east–west folds in the Alleghany Plateau are remnants of this orogeny.

=== Mesozoic (251-66 million years ago) ===
The Newark Lowlands of the Newark Basin extends into New York between the Hudson Highlands and the Manhattan Prong. The basin formed beginning 220 million years ago during the late Triassic as Pangea rifted apart. Failed rift basins like the Newark Basin filled with thick sequences of sediment. The Stockton Formation is the lowest unit, with feldspar rich sandstone and conglomerate alternating with layers of shale mudstone. A rift valley lake deposited the mudstone and black shale of the middle unit—the Lockatong Formation—which holds extremely well preserved fossilized freshwater fish. This is, in turn, is overlain by the red-brown shale mudstone and sandstone of the Brunswick Formation which merges with the Hammer Creek Conglomerate. Because rifting thinned the crust, magma upwelled and intruded the basin, producing the feldspar and pyroxene dominant diabase of the Palisades Sill and an almost pure layer olivine up to six meters thick. The sill intruded 195 million years ago in the Early Jurassic. Cooling of the melt led to columnar fracture giving its column-like appearance. Fractional crystallization of what may have been the same magma also left behind the Ladentown Basalt. Lakeshore mud preserved the footprints of a predatory coelophysis in New York along with fossilized fish, clams and arthropods.

Offshore of New York is the Fall Zone Peneplain, an area of much more ancient crystalline rocks that forms the slowly sinking continental shelf of eastern North America. Eroded nearly flat, this surface began to be covered by the current sediments of the Atlantic coastal plain beginning in the Jurassic. In fact, the current basement rocks date to a time span between the Proterozoic and early Jurassic. Recent geologic research has revealed the Baltimore Canyon Trough, a long basin south of Long Island filled with up to 12 kilometers of rock. Sedimentary rocks are about six kilometers thick in the Long Island Platform. Some of the thinnest sediments are only 600 meters thick at Fire Island.

A research well, COST B-3 drilled 130 kilometers off of Long Island in the Baltimore Canyon Trough, encountering two-kilometer thick rocks from the Cretaceous. Most rocks offshore are marl with some clay and limestone. The green mineral glauconite is particularly common.

=== Cenozoic (66 million years ago-present) ===
Aside from sediments produced or moved by glaciers, rivers and streams during the last 2.5 million years of the Quaternary, Cenozoic rocks are extremely rare in New York. A small Oligocene lignite deposit near Brandon, Vermont may extend into New York. Several kilometers of rock eroded and deposited offshore in the Atlantic coastal plain and eastern North American continental shelf.

Drilling offshore of New Jersey and Long Island indicates Cenozoic sediments 130 meters thick reaching up to 1.5 kilometers thick near the edge of the continental shelf. The biggest increase in thickness took place during the Miocene. Deeply weathered saprolite soils formed throughout the region, with small remnants found in New York City, the Adirondacks, and Catskills during highway construction.

Rivers responsible for transporting sediment out of the region were significantly rechanneled or filled with sediments during the Pleistocene glaciations. The Erian River once downcut Middle Devonian shales, feeding into the Erie Basin while the Ontarian River eroded Ordovician shales into the Ontario Basin. The Sound River has been inferred as an eastward flowing river replaced by Long Island Sound.
