= Syncline =

Geological fold

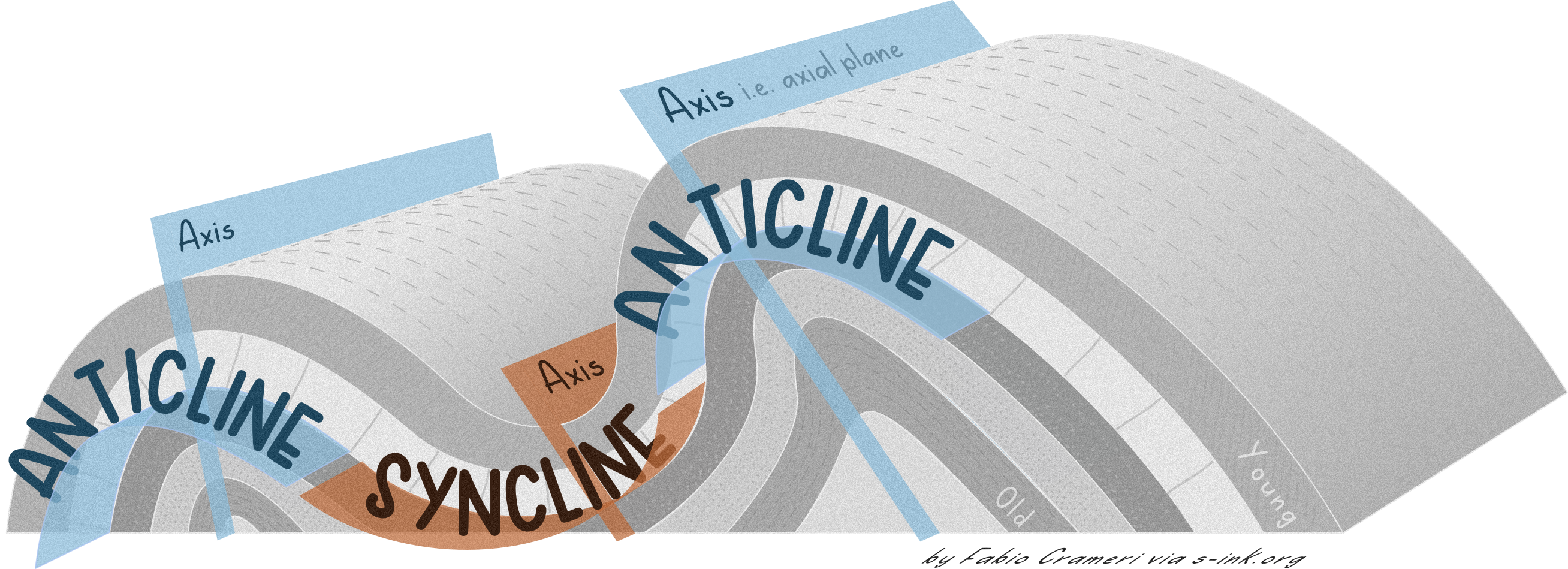
A syncline is a fold of rocks with younger rock layers closer to the center of the structure, whereas an anticline is the inverse of a syncline.

In structural geology, a syncline is a fold with younger layers closer to the center of the structure, whereas an anticline is the inverse of a syncline. A synclinorium (plural synclinoriums or synclinoria) is a large syncline with superimposed smaller folds. Synclines are typically a downward fold (synform), termed a synformal syncline (i.e. a trough), but synclines that point upwards can be found when strata have been overturned and folded (an antiformal syncline).

== Characteristics ==
On a geologic map, synclines are recognized as a sequence of rock layers, with the youngest at the fold's center or hinge and with a reverse sequence of the same rock layers on the opposite side of the hinge. If the fold pattern is circular or elongate, the structure is a basin. Folds typically form during crustal deformation as the result of compression that accompanies orogenic mountain building.

== Notable examples ==
- Powder River Basin, Wyoming, US
- Sideling Hill roadcut along Interstate 68 in western Maryland, US, where the Rockwell Formation and overlying Purslane Sandstone are exposed
- Forêt de Saou syncline in Saou, France
- Southland Syncline in the southeastern corner of the South Island of New Zealand, including The Catlins and the Hokonui Hills
- Strathmore Syncline, Scotland
- Wilpena Pound, Flinders Ranges, South Australia
- Fort Valley, Shenandoah County, Virginia
- Hondo Syncline in the Picuris Mountains of New Mexico, an example of an overturned syncline
- Afikpo syncline, Nigeria
- Table Mountain, South Africa
- Fairfield Basin, New South Wales, Australia

== Gallery ==
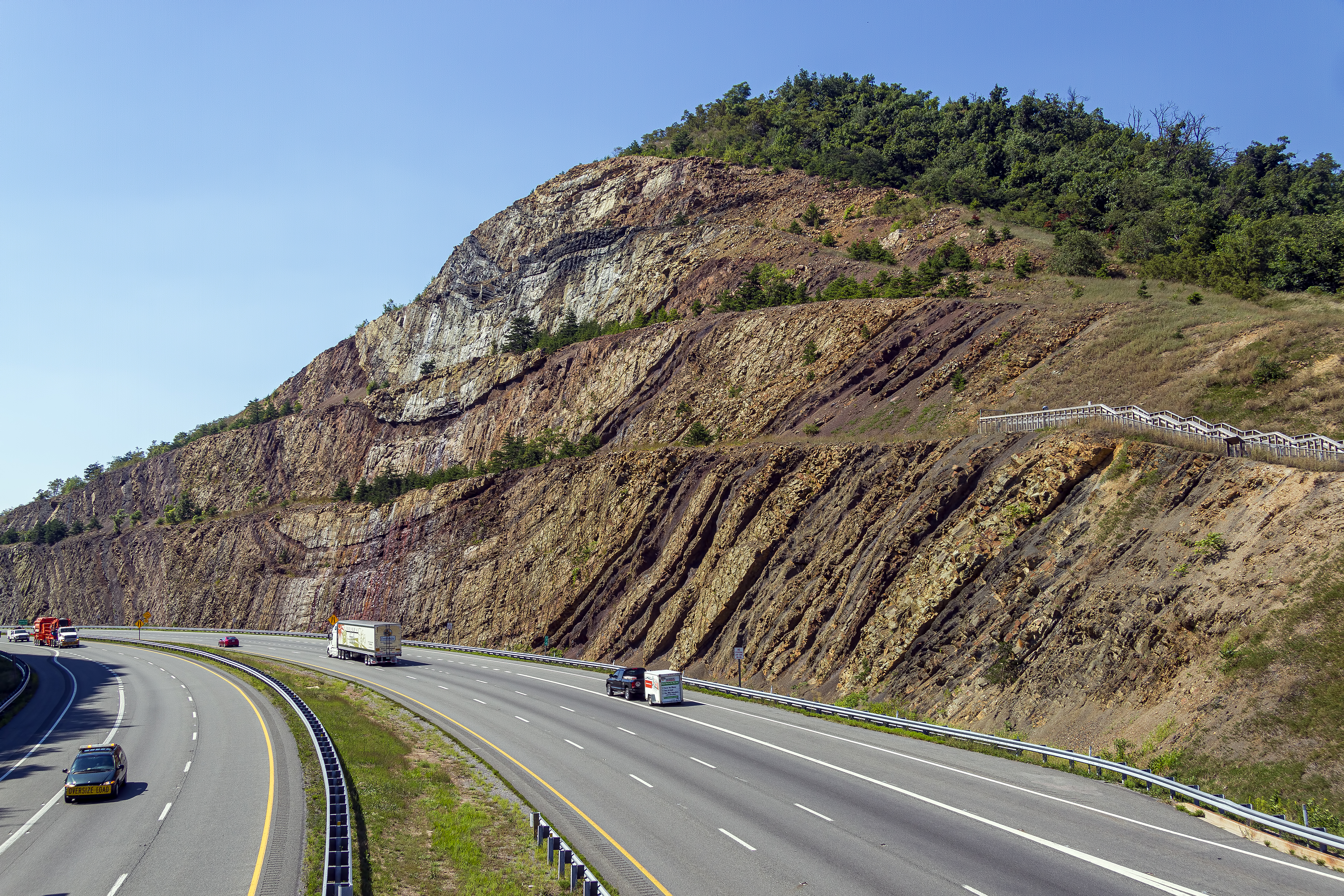
Syncline exposed in Sideling Hill roadcut

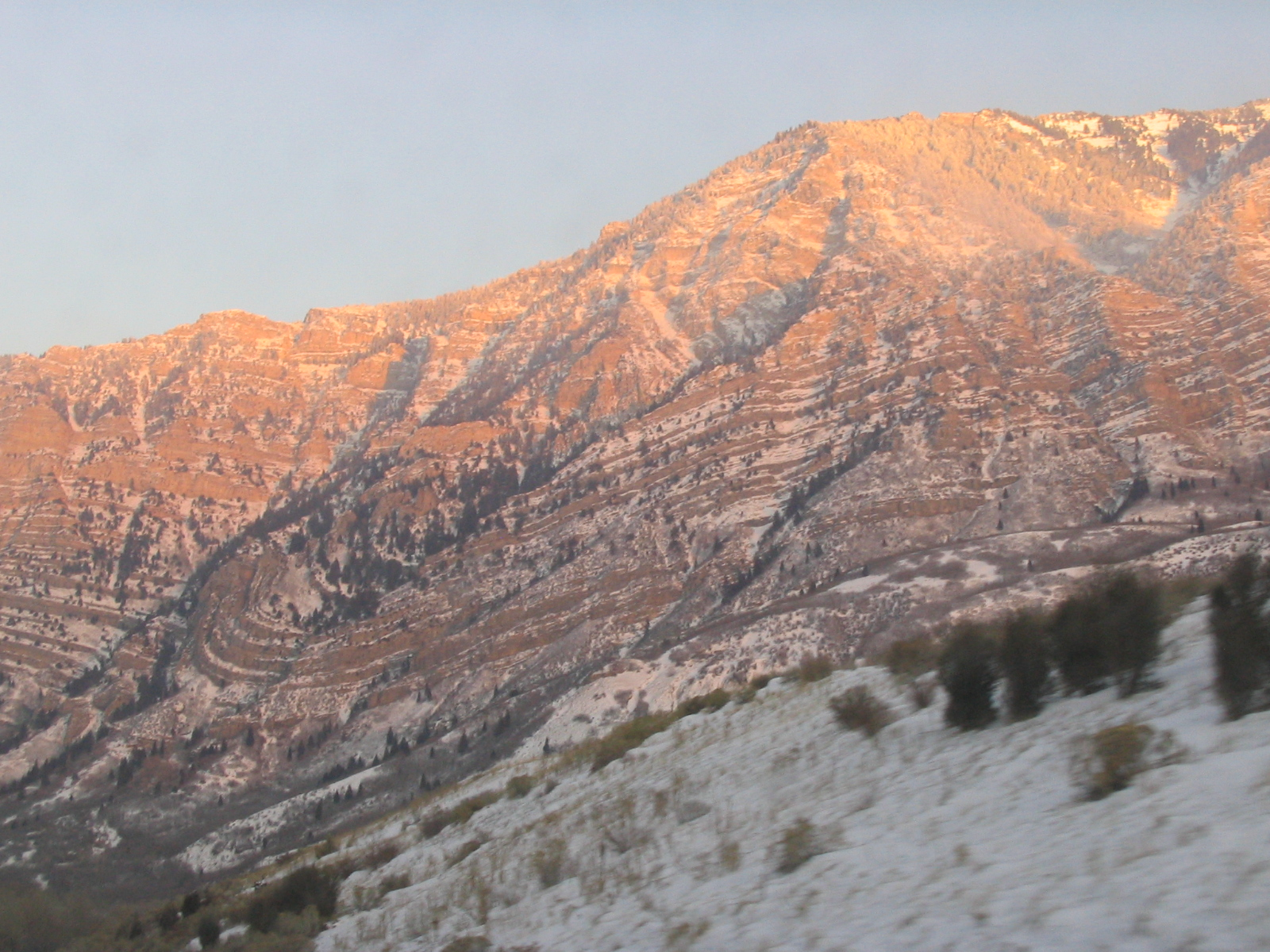
Snow-dusted syncline in Provo Canyon, Utah

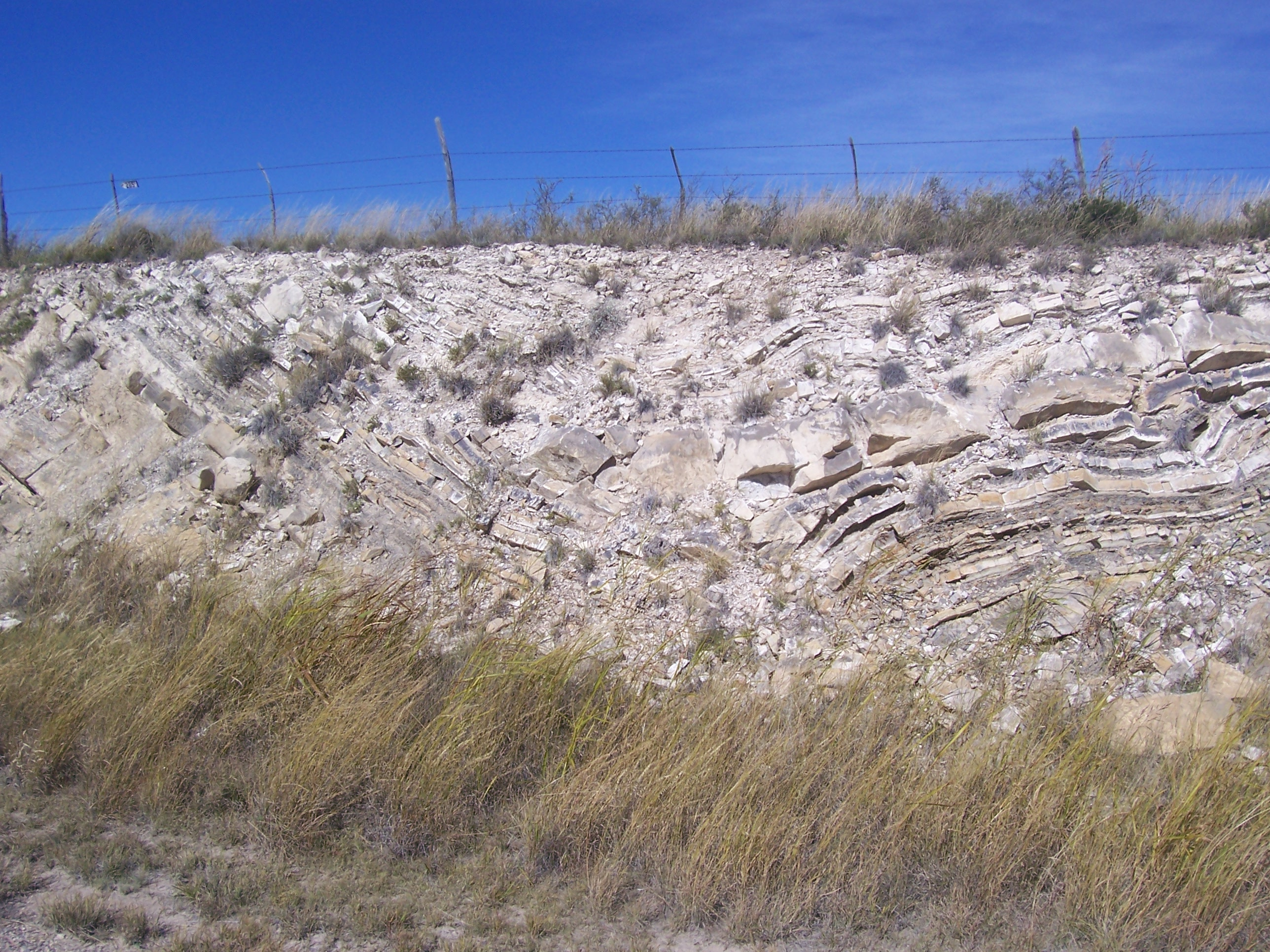
Road cut near Fort Davis, Texas showing a syncline

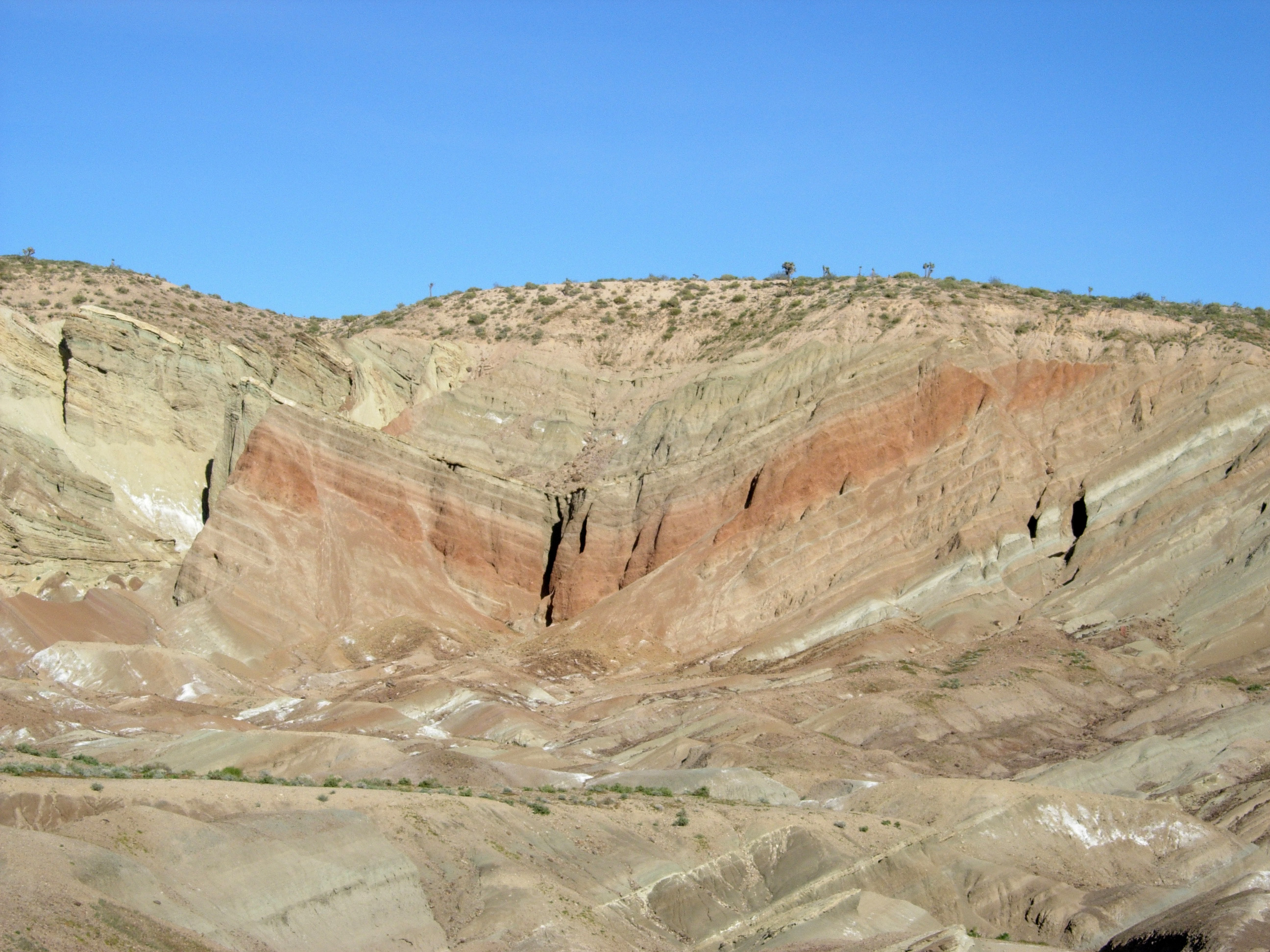
Rainbow Basin Syncline in the Barstow Formation near Barstow, California

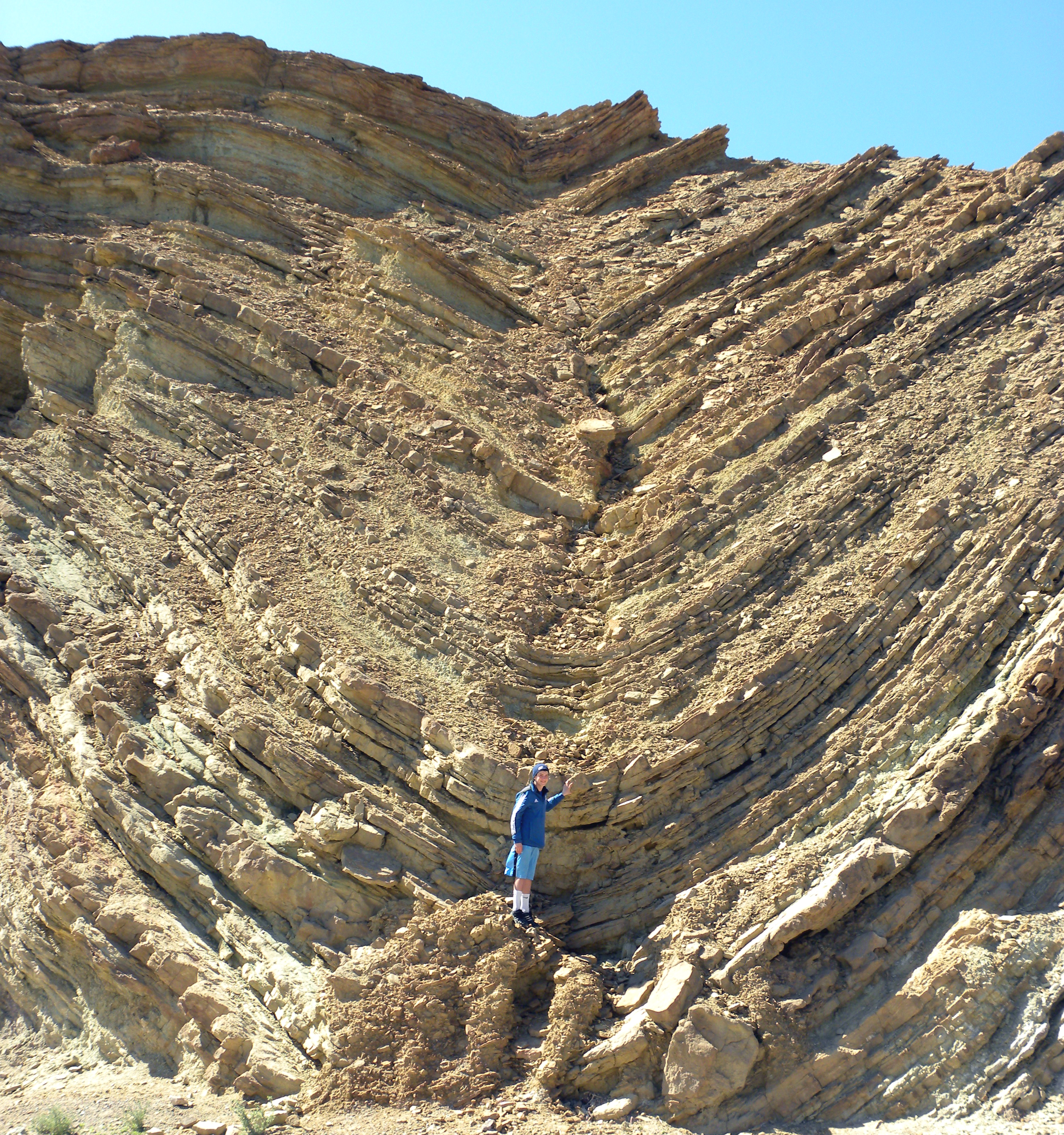
Syncline in the lower parking lot of Calico Ghost Town; the ductile folding is at the base and the brittle is above.

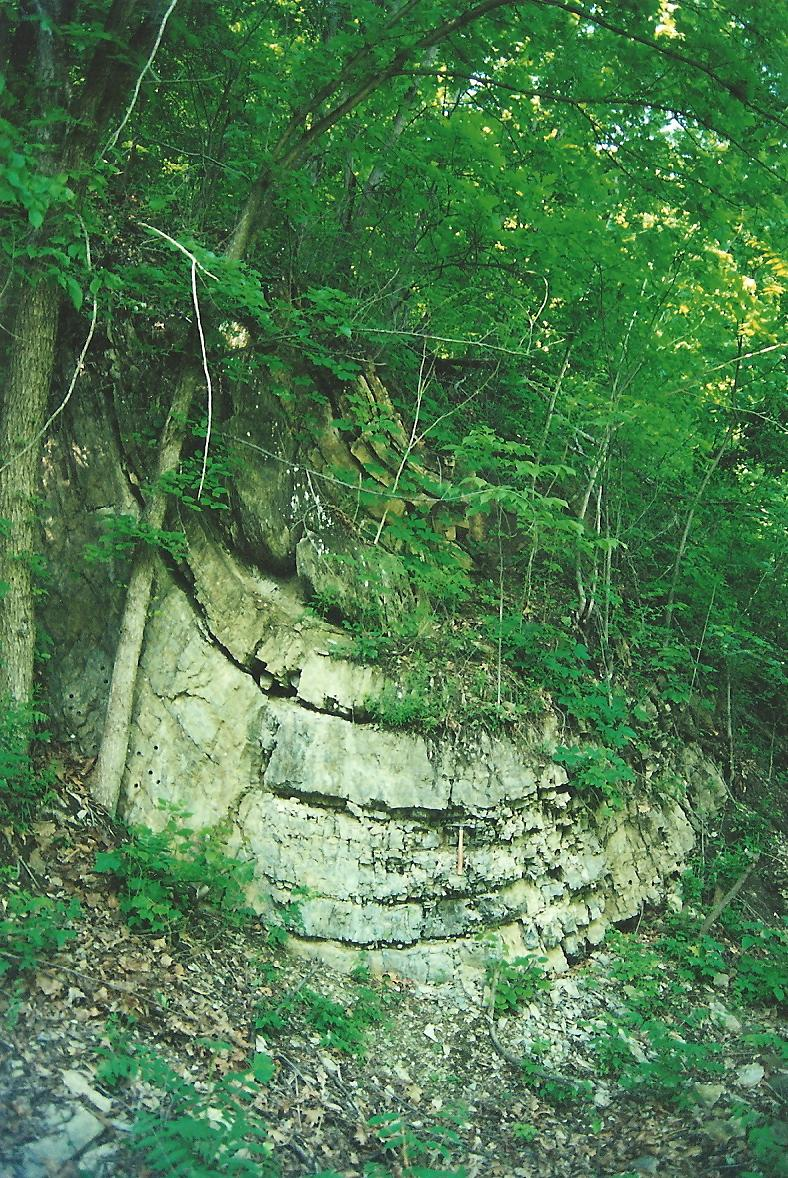
Synclinal fold in Silurian Wills Creek Formation or Bloomsburg Formation at Roundtop Hill (Maryland)

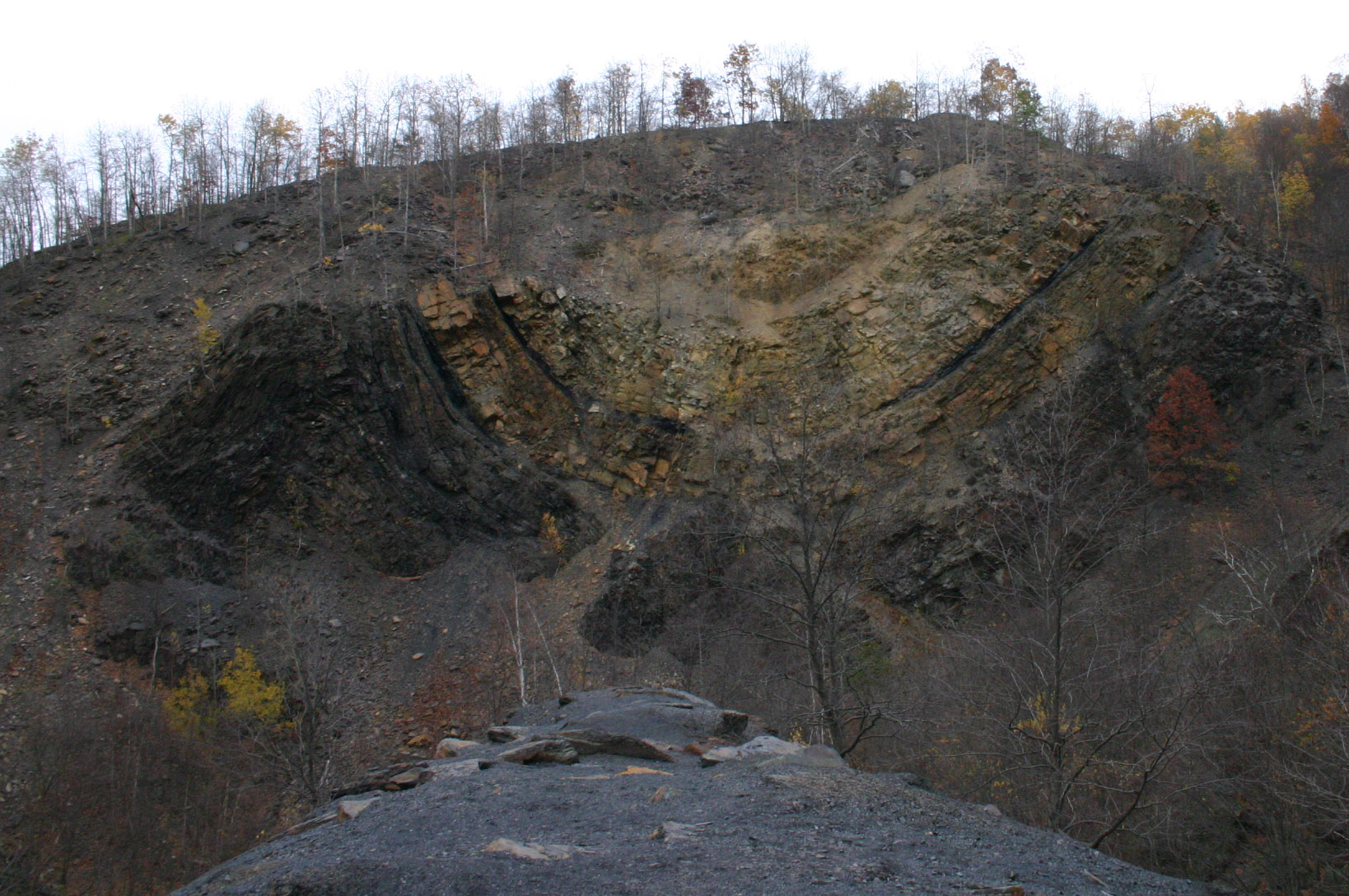
East wall of Bear Valley Strip Mine, near Shamokin, Pennsylvania

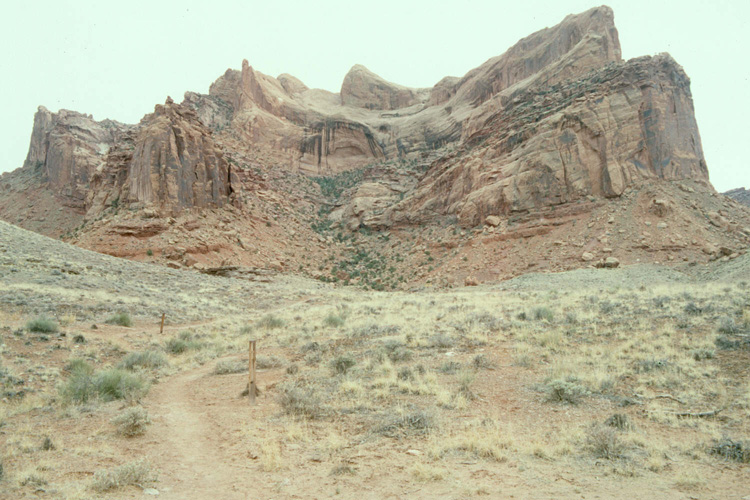
Syncline in Navajo Sandstone, Upheaval Dome, Canyonlands National Park, Utah

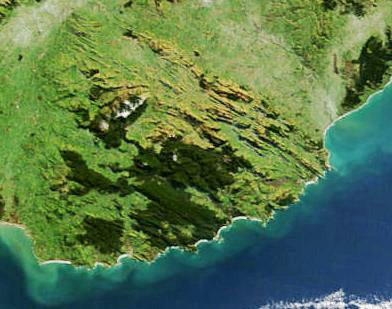
Satellite view of part of New Zealand's Southland Syncline, showing parallel folds running northwest–southeast

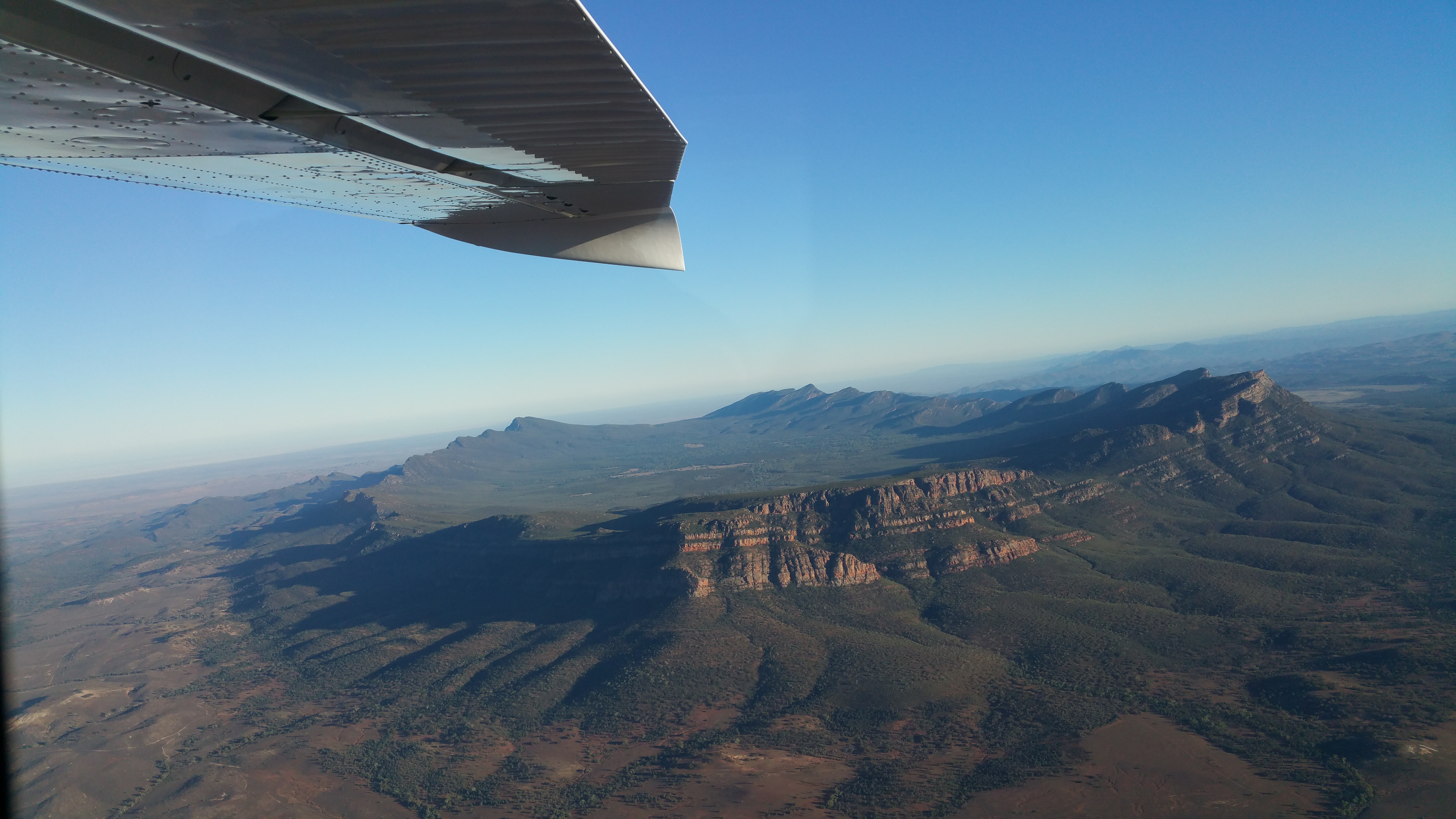
Wilpena Pound, a synclinal basin in the Flinders Ranges of South Australia

== See also ==
- Homocline
- Monocline
- Ridge-and-Valley Appalachians
- Structural basin
