= Roundtop Hill (Maryland) =

- Location within Maryland

Highest point
- Elevation: 1,358 feet (410 m)
- Prominence: 650 feet (200 m)
- Coordinates: 39°41′N 78°19′W

Geography
- Location: Washington County, Maryland, U.S.
- Parent range: Allegheny Mountains, part of the Ridge-and-Valley Appalachians
- Topo map(s): USGS Hancock (PA and MD) Quadrangle

Roundtop Hill is a mountain in Washington County, Maryland, southwest of the town of Hancock. The elevation at the summit is 1,358 feet (410 m).

== Geography ==
Unlike surrounding mountains, Roundtop Hill is not part of an extended ridge system, and is only about 2 miles (3.2 km) in length. It is located just under 1 mile (1.6 km) from the crest of Tonoloway Ridge, about 3.5 miles (5.6 km) southwest of Hancock. Its presence causes a large bend in the Potomac River, which curves around its eastern slope. Much of the eastern face is part of the Chesapeake and Ohio Canal National Historical Park and the canal bed and tow path pass along the narrow bank at its base.

== Geology ==
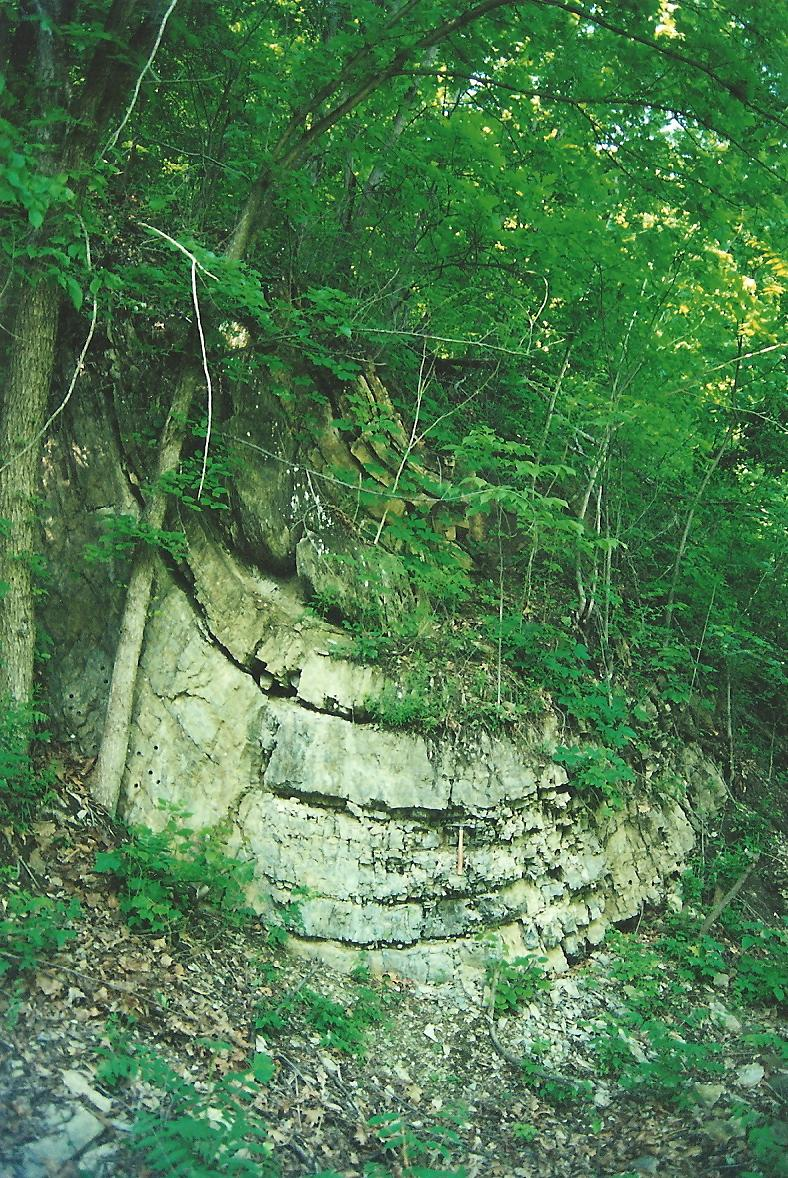
Synclinal fold

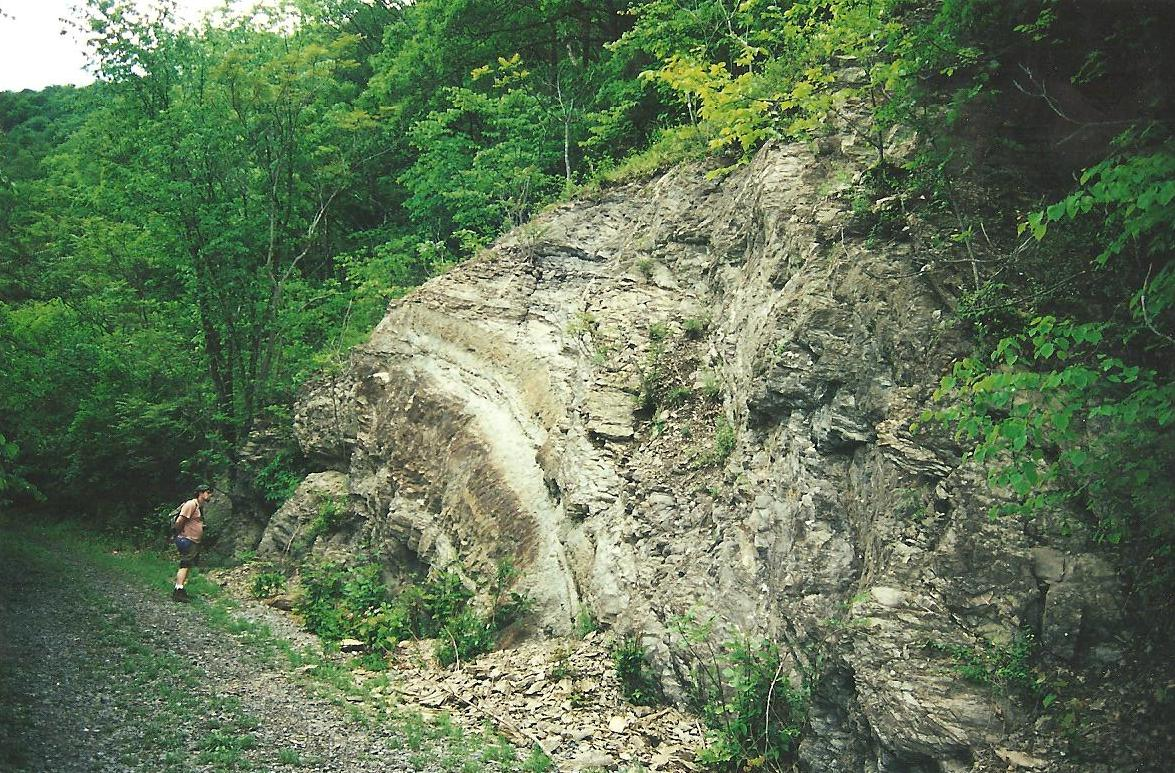
Anticlinal fold

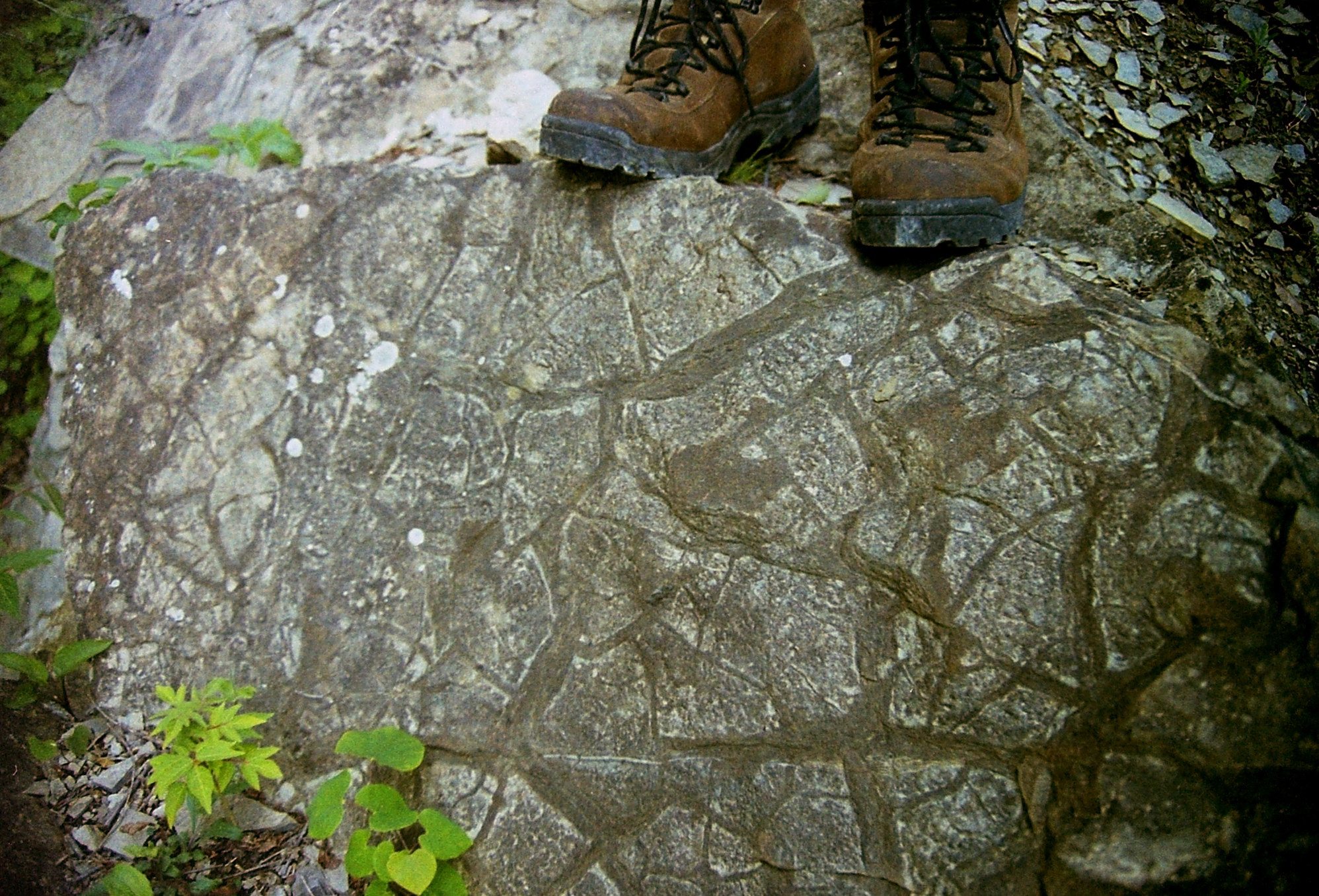
Preserved mudcracks at Roundtop Hill

Outstanding outcrops of the Silurian Wills Creek Formation and underlying Bloomsburg Formation are exposed along the old railroad grade at Roundtop Hill. Examples of folding, formation of cleavage, thrust faulting, and the deformation of bedded rocks are visible. About 500 feet of strata are exposed.
