= Taconic unconformity =

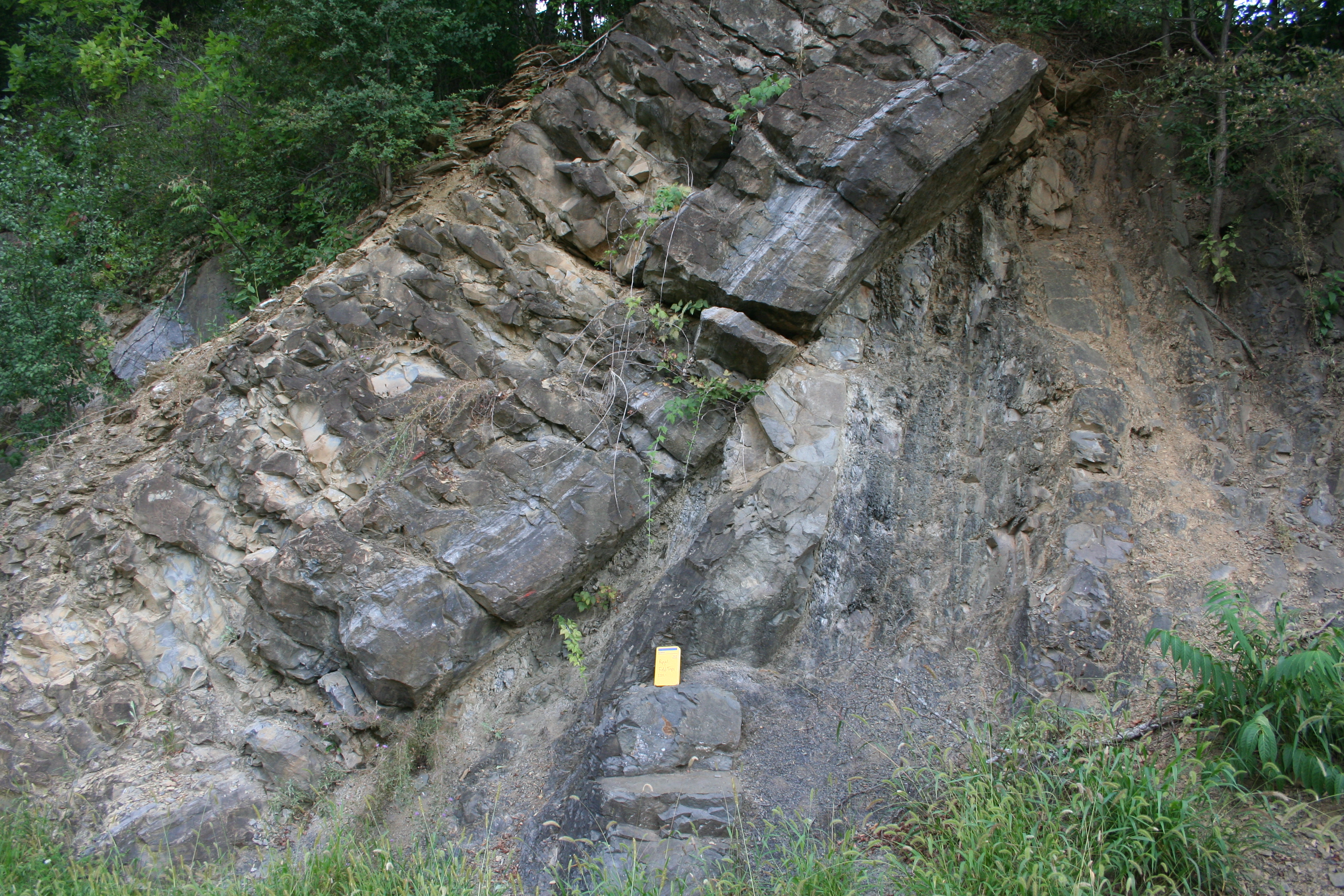
The Taconic Unconformity, near Catskill, NY

The Taconic unconformity is a major unconformity created during the Taconic orogeny, exposed from eastern New York State to the Gaspe peninsula. The orogeny was a long one that comprised multiple bursts; it primarily dated to the end of the Ordovician, and the underlying rocks are primarily this age. It is overlain by Silurian and Devonian metasediments.
