= Shawangunk Formation =

Bedrock unit in eastern Pennsylvania, New Jersey, and New York

- Stratigraphic range: Lower Silurian
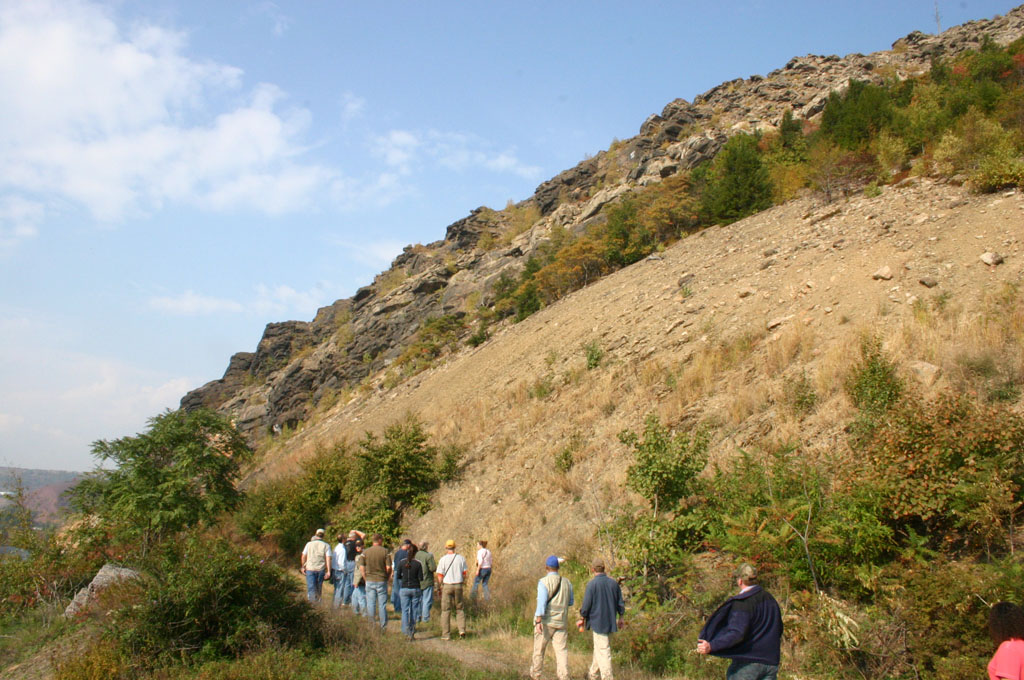
- Exposure of the Shawangunk at Lehigh Gap in Pennsylvania
- Type: Geological formation
- Underlies: Bloomsburg Formation
- Overlies: Martinsburg Formation
- Thickness: approx. 1400 ft

Lithology
- Primary: quartzarenite (sandstone), conglomerate

Location
- Region: Appalachian Mountains
- Extent: Pennsylvania, New Jersey, New York

Type section
- Named for: Shawangunk Ridge
- Named by: W. W. Mather, 1840

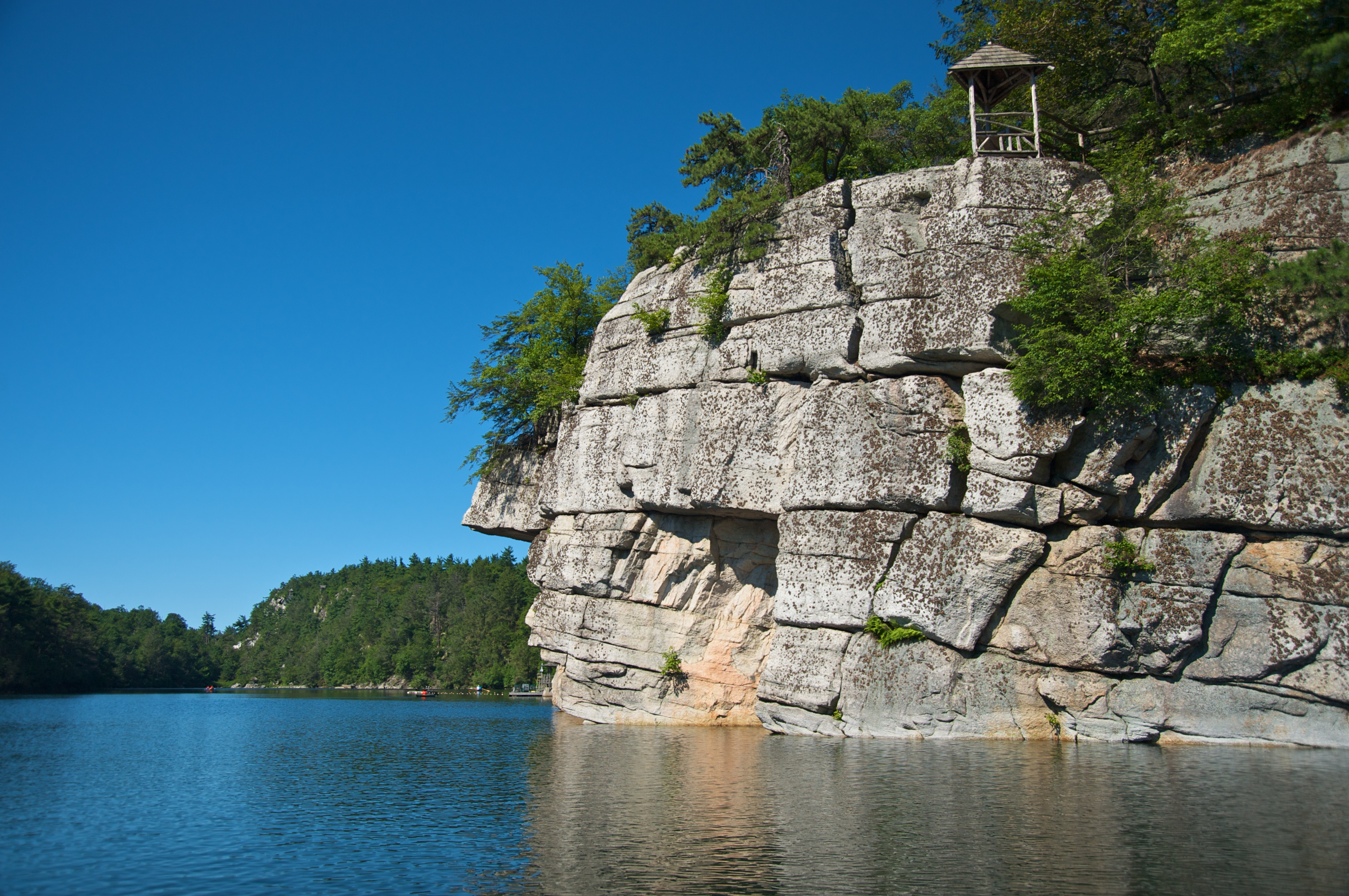
Cliff shaped by glacial movement surrounding the Mohonk Lake at Mohonk Mountain House on Shawangunk Ridge

Hand sample of the Shawangunk conglomerate from Blue Mountain, near New Tripoli, Pennsylvania

The Silurian Shawangunk Formation is a mapped bedrock unit in eastern Pennsylvania, New Jersey, and New York. It is named for the Shawangunk Ridge for which it is the dominant rock type. The division of the Shawangunk between the Tuscarora Formation and Clinton Group has not been conclusively determined. The shift of nomenclature currently has the divide between Hawk Mountain and Lehigh Gap.

== Description ==
The Shawangunk is defined as a light to dark-gray, fine to very coarse grained sandstone and conglomerate, containing a few shale interbeds. There are also four members of this formation: Tammany, Lizard Creek, Minsi, and Weiders.

The Lizard Creek member is described at Lehigh Gap as having conglomerates, sandstone, calcareous sandstone, siltstone, and shale with a few minor red beds. The Minsi Member is described as a conglomeritic quartzite and the Weiders is described as both a conglomerate and quartzite. The Tammany and Lizard Creek members are equivalent to the Clinton Formation and the Minsi and Weiders members are equivalent to the Tuscarora Formation in the central and western part of Pennsylvania. The Tammany Member was not described at Lehigh Gap.

=== Depositional environment ===
The depositional environment of the Shawangunk has always been interpreted as mostly terrestrial to a shallow marine deposit resulting in a molasse sequence produced by the Taconic orogeny. The numerous coarse-grained beds, especially in the lower part, suggest a relatively close orogenic source with very high to high energy fluvial systems depositing the sediments. Shale interbeds may indicate a slowing or shifting of these ancient river systems.

=== Fossils ===
Very few fossils exist in the Shawangunk; however, Eurypterids can be found in the middle portions of the formation roughly 420–750 feet from the base in some locations in New York State. Linguloid brachiopods were identified in the Lizard Creek Member.

The ichnofossil Arthrophycus was described in the Minsi Member in the area of Lehigh Gap. These were most likely made by polychaete worms of the family Terebellida.

=== Notable Exposures ===
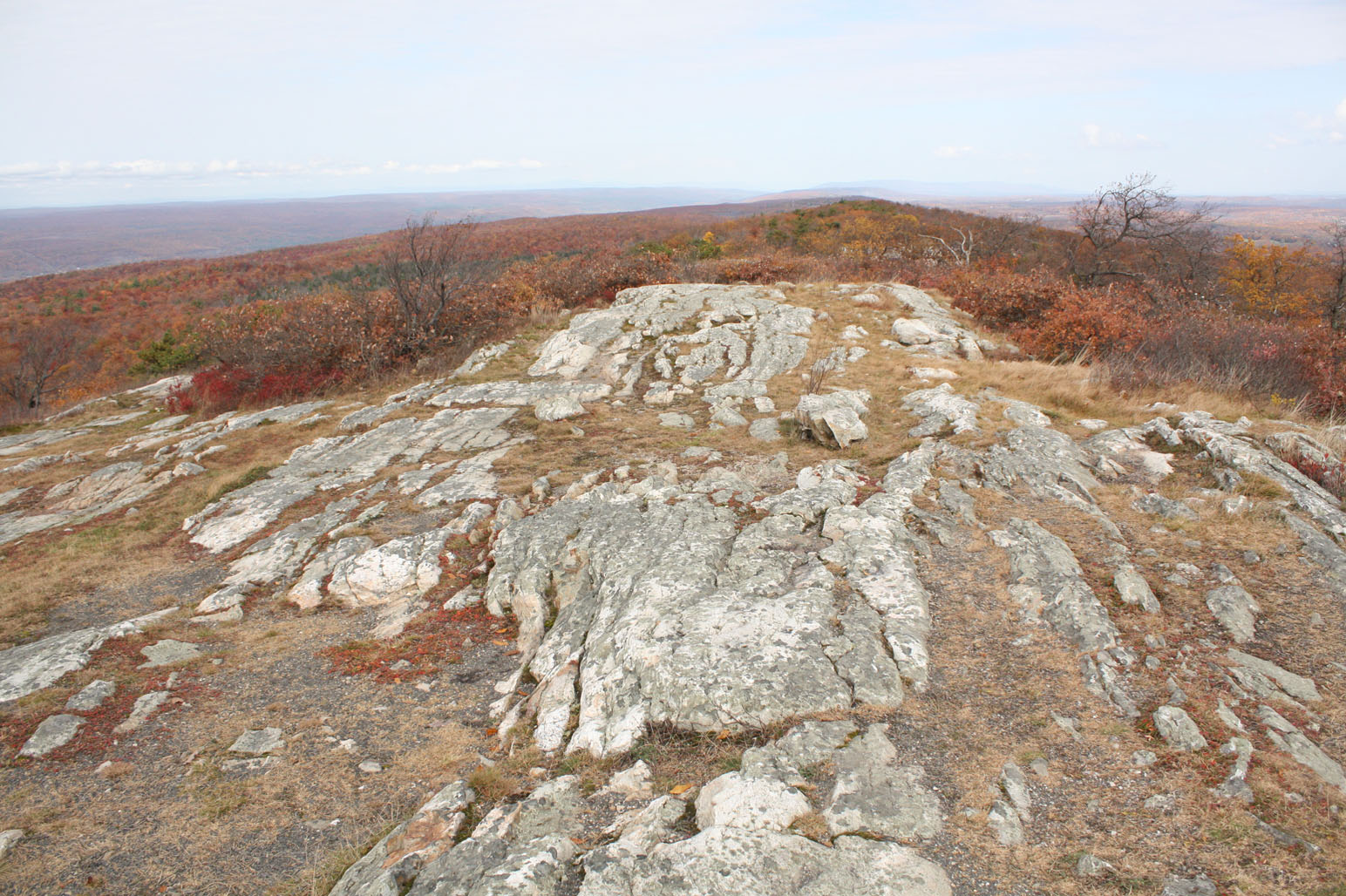
Shawangunk Formation (in foreground) at High Point State Park in New Jersey

- Delaware Water Gap
- Lehigh Gap, Pennsylvania
- High Point State Park, New Jersey

== Age ==
Relative age dating of the Shawangunk places it in the Lower Silurian period, being deposited between 440 and 417 (±10) million years ago. It rests unconformably above the Martinsburg Formation and conformably below the Bloomsburg Formation.

== Economic uses ==
The hardness of the quartzite and conglomerate layers make the Shawangunk an excellent building stone. Some of the boulders that have accumulated as colluvium at the base of Blue Mountain are used for decorative stone, building stone, and aggregate.

== See also ==
- Geology of Pennsylvania
- Geology of New Jersey
- Blue Mountain (Pennsylvania)
- Kittatinny Mountain
- Shawangunk Ridge
- Lehigh Gap, Pennsylvania
