= Tonoloway Formation =

Geologic formation in the United States

- Stratigraphic range: Pridoli
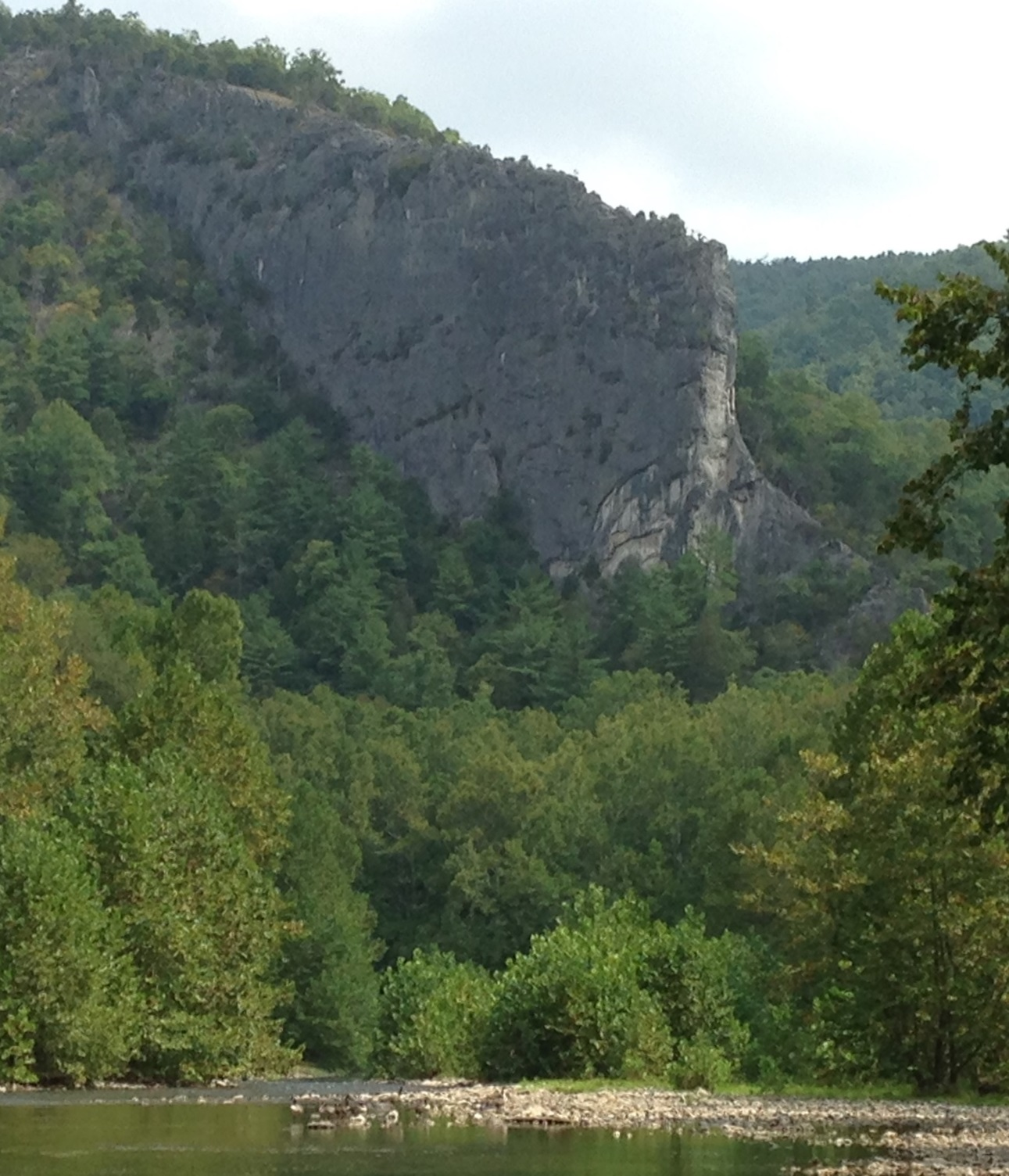
- A Tonoloway limestone "fin" known as Blue Rock, Smoke Hole Canyon, West Virginia
- Type: sedimentary
- Underlies: Keyser Formation
- Overlies: Wills Creek Formation
- Thickness: 250+/-20 m

Lithology
- Primary: limestone
- Other: shale

Location
- Region: Appalachian Mountains
- Extent: Pennsylvania, Maryland, Virginia, West Virginia

Type section
- Named for: Tonoloway Ridge, Rock Ford, WV
- Named by: E. O. Ulrich, 1911

The Late Silurian Tonoloway Formation is a mapped limestone bedrock unit in Pennsylvania, Maryland, Virginia and West Virginia. The Tonoloway is roughly equivalent to the Salina group that is found to the north and west.

== Description ==
The basal 50 m consists of medium-dark-gray laminated to thin-bedded calcisiltite with shale partings and interbeds. Overlying 5 m are light-yellowish-gray to olive-gray mudstone and shale. Above this interval are 75 m of laminated calcisiltite with interbeds of thick to very thick bedded calcisiltite. The remainder of the formation is cyclic, consisting of three or four resistant ledges of laminated limestone and shale. Uppermost 20 m contains a variety of limestones. Lower contact with the Wills Creek is probably conformable. Upper contact is conformable and undulatory, occurring at the base of the "calico" limestone of the Keyser Formation.

=== Depositional environment ===
The depositional environment of the Tonoloway is interpreted as shallow marine.

=== Notable exposures ===
- Tonoloway Ridge (type section), in Pennsylvania, Maryland, and West Virginia.
- Along Little Juniata River, 2 km northeast of Bellwood, Pennsylvania
- Blue Rock, and other large outcroppings, in the Smoke Hole Canyon of eastern West Virginia
- Trout Pond, in Hardy County, West Virginia

== Age ==
Relative age dating places the Tonoloway in the late Silurian.
