= Queenston Delta =

The Queenston Delta is a 300-mile-wide clastic wedge of sediment deposited over what is now eastern North America during the late Ordovician period due to the erosion of mountains created during the Taconic orogeny. The wedge is thickest in a band running from New York State to Quebec and extends from the Catskill mountains to Lake Huron.
