= Mifflintown Formation =

Geologic formation in Maryland

- Stratigraphic range: Silurian
- Type: Formation
- Underlies: Bloomsburg Formation
- Overlies: Clinton Group

Location
- Region: Maryland, Pennsylvania, and Virginia
- Country: United States

The Mifflintown Formation is a geologic formation in Maryland, Pennsylvania, and Virginia. It preserves fossils dating back to the Silurian period. The type location is near Mifflintown, Pennsylvania.

== See also ==
- List of fossiliferous stratigraphic units in Maryland
- Paleontology in Maryland
