= Bloomsburg Formation =

- Stratigraphic range: Gorstian - Ludfordian ~425 Ma
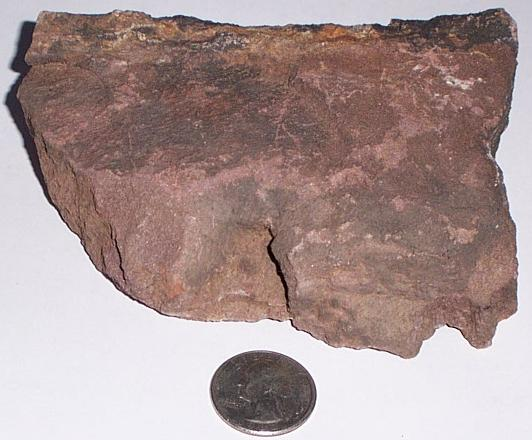
- A hand sample of the Bloomsburg Siltstone from Port Clinton, Pennsylvania
- Type: sedimentary
- Underlies: Wills Creek Formation
- Overlies: Clinton Group, McKenzie Formation, Mifflintown Formation, and Shawangunk Formation
- Thickness: up to 5,000 feet (1,520 m)

Lithology
- Primary: Siltstone
- Other: Shale, Claystone, Sandstone, Limestone

Location
- Region: Appalachian Basin of eastern North America
- Extent: Maryland, New Jersey, New York, Pennsylvania, and Virginia

Type section
- Named for: Bloomsburg, Pennsylvania
- Named by: I. C. White, 1883

The Silurian Bloomsburg Formation is a mapped bedrock unit in Pennsylvania, New Jersey, New York and Maryland. It is named for the town of Bloomsburg, Pennsylvania, in which it was first described. The Bloomsburg marked the first occurrence of red sedimentary rocks in the Appalachian Basin.

== Description ==
The Bloomsburg is defined as a grayish-red and greenish-gray claystone, argillaceous siltstone, shale, and very fine to fine-grained sandstone, arranged in fining-upward cycles. Although the Bloomsburg can sometimes be green to gray, its most dominant color is red and they are often called "The Bloomsburg Red Beds". This is significant in the Appalachian Basin since it marks the first large scale terrestrial collection of sediments in the rock record. Most of the sediments that were deposited before this time were marine, or a small scale terrestrial zone.

In New Jersey, the Bloomsburg Red Beds were previously called the "High Falls Shale" or "High Falls Formation".

=== Depositional environment ===
The depositional environment of the Bloomsburg was mostly terrestrial or shallow marine deposits resulting in a molasse sequence produced by the Taconic orogeny. The red color is often evidence that the sediments were deposited in arid or oxidizing conditions. The upper parts of the Bloomsburg are thought to be a marine transition zone.

== Stratigraphy ==
Early American geologists theorized that these beds correlated with Old Red Sandstone found in Scotland., but the Old Red Sandstone is Devonian in age, or much younger than the Bloomsburg.

The Bloomsburg rests conformably above the Clinton Group and Shawangunk Formation, and has a complex upper contact. In eastern Pennsylvania and New Jersey, the upper part of the Bloomsburg marks the Wallbridge Unconformity. To the west, the Wills Creek Formation lies conformably atop the Bloomsburg. Further west, the McKenzie Member of the Mifflintown Formation interfingers with the Bloomsburg and eventually, the Bloomsburg pinches out into the Mifflintown.

=== Fossils ===
There are numerous fossils found in the Bloomsburg, mostly in the upper parts of the formation. There are trace fossils of early land plants and brachiopod fossils in the upper marine transitional zones.

=== Notable Exposures ===
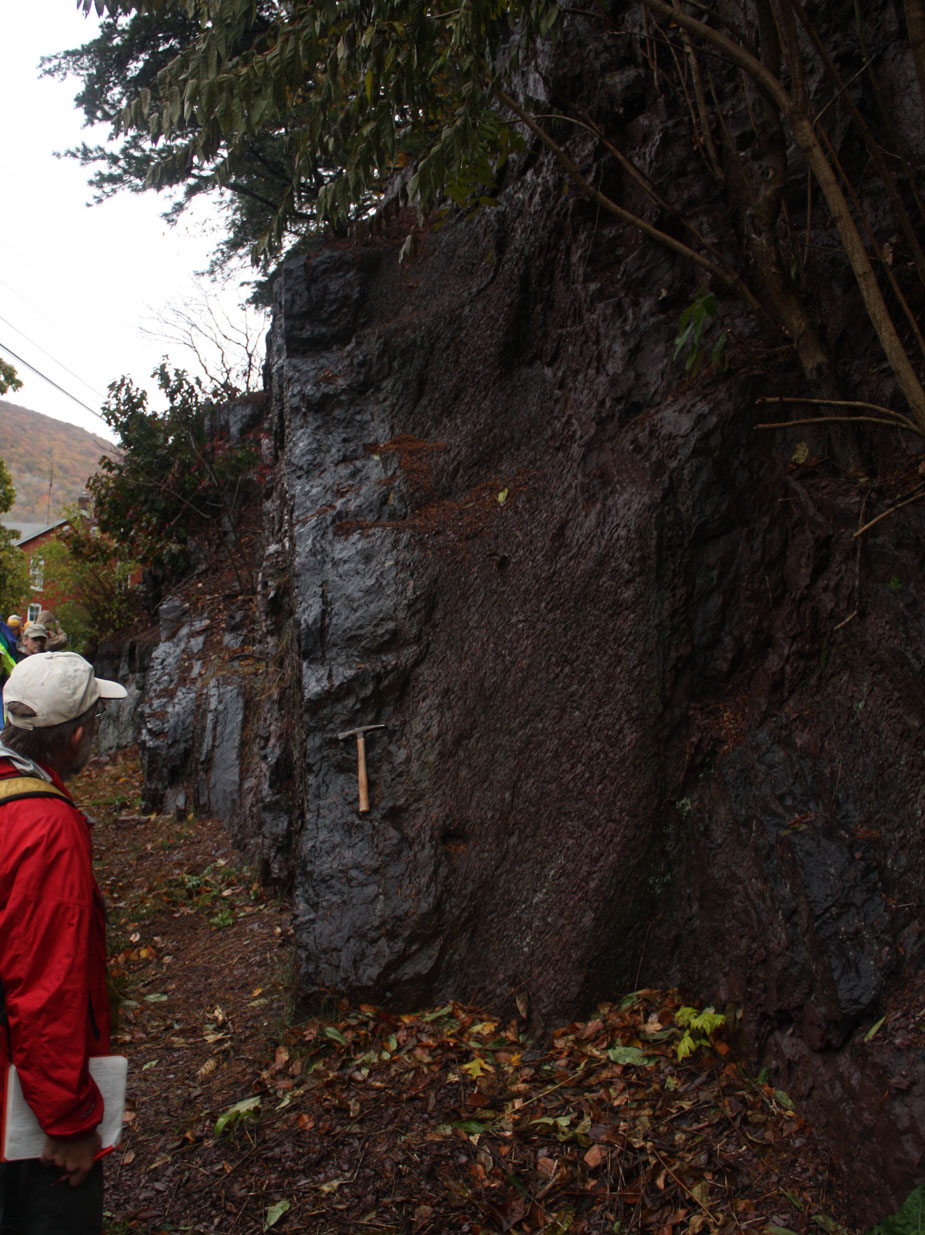
Outcrop of the Bloomsburg Formation at Port Clinton

- Roundtop Hill, Maryland, along railroad grade
- Port Clinton, Pennsylvania, where bedding is nearly vertical and cleavage is visible
- U.S. Route 22, 2.3 km northeast of Canoe Creek

== Age ==
Relative age dating of the Bloomsburg places it in the Upper Silurian period, being deposited between 417 and 410 (±5) million years ago.

== Economic uses ==
The Bloomsburg formation is a source of material for the manufacture of brick and other clay products, as well as a local building stone.

== See also ==
- Geology of Pennsylvania
