= Tonoloway Ridge =

Mountain ridge in the US

Highest point
- Elevation: 393.8 m (1,292 ft)
- Coordinates: 39°34′18″N 78°19′32″W

Geography
- Location: Maryland, Pennsylvania, West Virginia, U.S.
- Parent range: Ridge-and-Valley Appalachians
- Topo map(s): USGS Great Cacapon, Hancock

Climbing
- Easiest route: Hike, drive

Tonoloway Ridge is a stratigraphic ridge that runs southwest northeast through the U.S. states of Pennsylvania, Maryland, and West Virginia. It reaches its highest elevation above mean sea level of 1,292 feet (393.8 m) at a knob on its southern end in Morgan County, West Virginia. Tonoloway Ridge is separated by gaps at Great Cacapon on the Potomac River and at Little Tonoloway Creek where it is traversed by Interstate 68 in Maryland.
