= Taconic orogeny =

Mountain-building period that affected most of New England

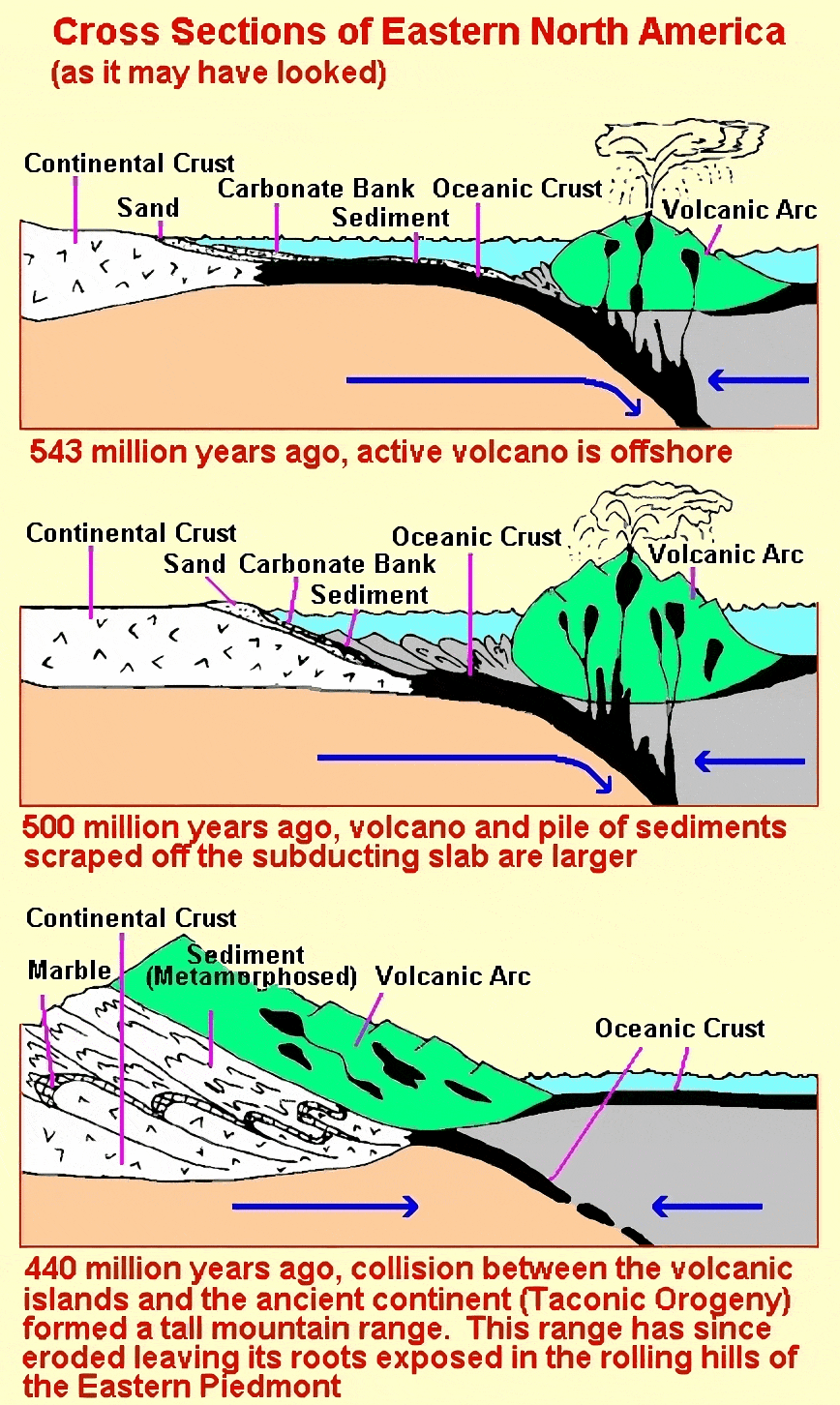
Illustration of the Taconic orogeny

The Taconic orogeny was a mountain building period that ended 440 million years ago (Ma) and affected most of modern-day New England. A great mountain chain formed from Eastern Canada down through what is now the Piedmont of the east coast of the United States. As the mountain chain eroded during the Silurian and Devonian periods, sediment spread throughout the present-day Appalachians and midcontinental North America.

== New England and Canada ==
Beginning in Cambrian time, about 550 Ma, the Iapetus Ocean began to close. The weight of accumulating sediments, in addition to compressional forces in the crust, forced the eastern edge of the North American continent to fold gradually downward, leading to shallow-water carbonate deposition, which persisted on the continental shelf margin through late Cambrian into early Ordovician time. This was followed by fine-grained clastic deposition and deeper water conditions during the middle Ordovician. In this period a convergent plate boundary developed along the eastern edge of a small island chain. Crustal material beneath the Iapetus Ocean sank into the mantle along a subduction zone with an eastward-dipping orientation. Dewatering of the down-going plate led to hydration of the peridotites in the overlying mantle wedge, lowering their melting point. This led to partial melting of the peridotites within the mantle wedge producing magma that returned to the surface to form the offshore Bronson Hill island arc.

By the Late Ordovician, this island arc had collided with the North American continent. The sedimentary and igneous rock between the land masses were intensely folded and faulted and were subjected to varying degrees of metamorphism. This was the final episode of the Taconic orogeny. Cameron's Line is the suture zone that is modern-day evidence of the collision of the island arc and the continent. Cameron's Line winds southward out of New England into western Connecticut and passes through southern New York across the Bronx, following the general trend of the East River. It extends beneath sedimentary cover on Staten Island and southward beneath the coastal plain of New Jersey. Basement rocks to the west of Cameron's Line are regarded as autochthonous, meaning that they have not been significantly displaced by tectonic processes. The rocks to the west of Cameron's Line include metamorphosed sedimentary material originally comprising ancient continental slope, rise, and shelf deposits. The rocks to the east of Cameron's Line are allochthonous, which means they have been shoved westward over autochthonous basement rocks on the order of many tens or even hundreds of kilometers. These rocks were originally deposited as sediments in a deep water basin. Cameron's Line represents the trace of a subduction zone that ceased when the Bronson Hill Arc collided with, and became accreted onto, the eastern margin of North America. Many of the rocks east of Cameron's Line were once part of the floor of the Iapetus Ocean.

When the Taconic orogeny subsided during the Late Ordovician (about 440 Ma), subduction ended, culminating in the accretion of the Iapetus Terrane onto the eastern margin of the continent. This resulted in the formation of a great mountain range throughout New England and eastern Canada, and perhaps to a lesser degree, southward along the region that is now the Piedmont of eastern North America. The expanded continental margin gradually stabilized. Erosion continued to strip away sediments from upland areas. Inland seas covering the midcontinent gradually expanded eastward into the New York Bight region and became the site of shallow clastic and carbonate deposition. This tectonically quiet period persisted until the late Devonian (about 360 Ma) when the next period of mountain-building began, the Acadian orogeny.

== Southern Appalachians ==
In the southern Appalachians of Alabama, Georgia, and North Carolina, the Taconic orogeny was not associated with collision of an island arc with ancient North America (Laurentia). Geologists working in these areas have long puzzled over the "missing" arc terrane typical of Taconic-aged rocks in New England and Canada. Instead, the Iapetus margin of this part of Laurentia appears to have faced a back-arc basin during the Ordovician, suggesting that Iapetus oceanic crust was subducted beneath Laurentia—unlike the New England and Canadian segments of the margin, where Laurentia was on the subducting plate.

In contrast to the Ordovician geologic history of New England, rocks in the southern Appalachians—including those of the Dahlonega gold belt (Georgia and North Carolina), Talladega belt (Alabama and Georgia), and eastern Blue Ridge (Georgia, Tennessee, and North Carolina)—are not typical of a volcanic arc. Instead, these rocks have geochemical and other characteristics typical of back-arc basins, which form behind the volcanic arc on the overriding plate. The presence of these early-middle Ordovician (480 - 460 Ma) back-arc basin rocks in direct or faulted contact with rocks of the Laurentian shelf and slope-rise in the southern Appalachians suggests they were built on the margin of Laurentia, beyond the edge of the continental shelf-slope break.

The Ordovician Laurentian margin probably resembled that seen in the modern Sea of Japan, with the continental mainland separated from a volcanic arc by a narrow, "marginal" seaway. Other lines of evidence include mixing of Ordovician and Grenville (1000 Ma) detrital zircons in metamorphosed sedimentary sequences, and interlayering of metamorphosed Ordovician volcanic rocks with sedimentary rocks derived from the Laurentian margin.

== Relation with the Famatinian orogeny ==
It has been suggested that the coeval Famatinian orogeny in western Gondwana (South America) is the "southward" continuation of the Taconic orogeny. (Note: In other words what is at present the southern end of the Taconic orogeny would have been connected with what is currently the northern end of the Famatinian orogeny.) This has been explained by adding that Laurentia could have collided with western Gondwana in early Paleozoic times during the closure of the Iapetus Ocean. According to this view the Cuyania terrane would be an allochthonous block of Laurentian origin that was left in Gondwana. But such views are challenged since Cuyania is alternatively suggested to have drifted across Iapetus Ocean as a microcontinent starting in Laurentia and accreting then to Gondwana. A third model claims Cuyania is para-autochthonous and arrived at its current place by strike-slip faults starting not from Laurentia but from Gondwana.

== Aftermath ==
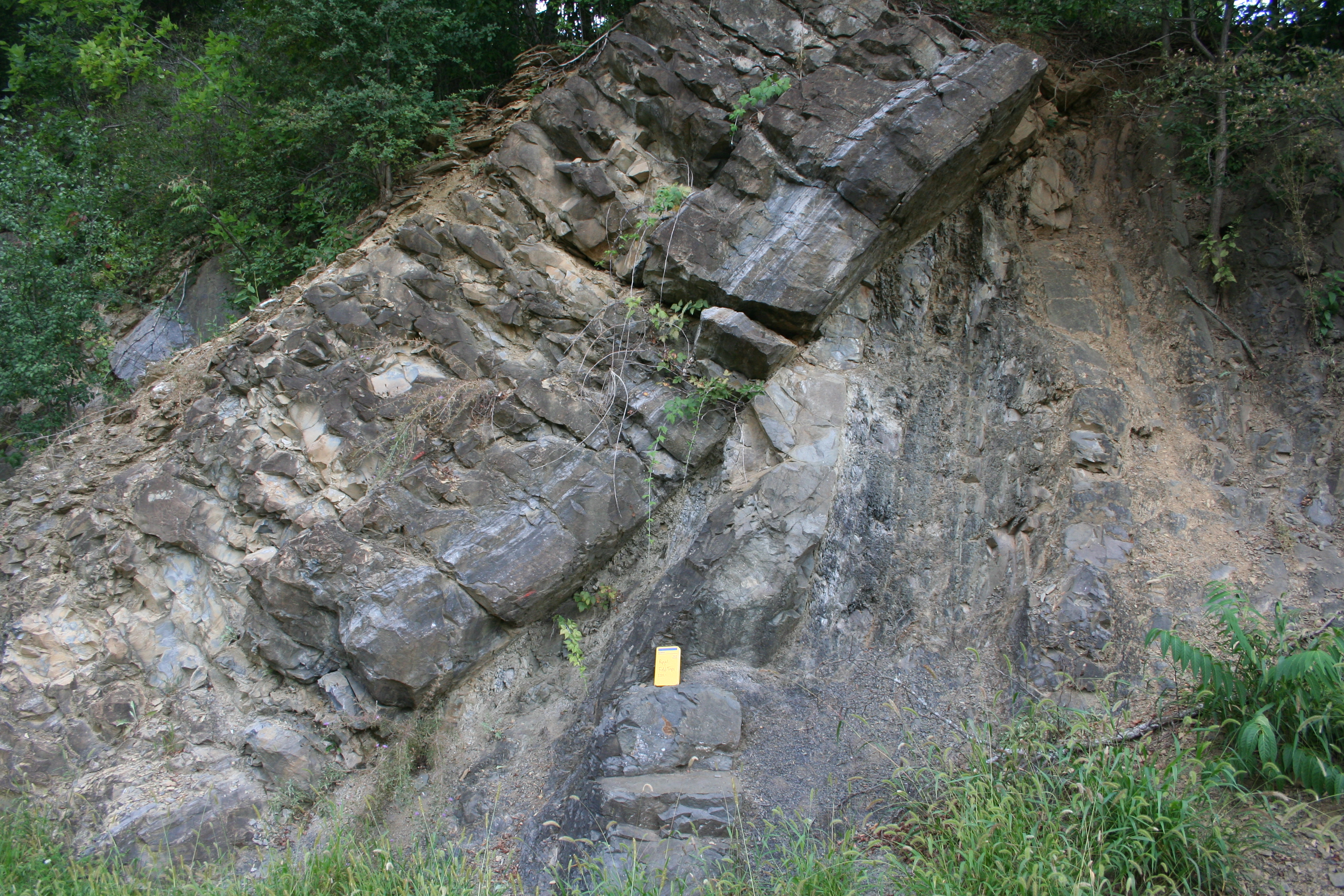
The "Taconic Unconformity" is an angular unconformity exposed from eastern New York State to the Gaspe peninsula

As the Taconic orogeny subsided in early Silurian time, uplifts and folds in the Hudson Valley region were beveled by erosion. Upon this surface sediments began to accumulate, derived from remaining uplifts in the New England region. The evidence for this is the Silurian Shawangunk Conglomerate, a massive, ridge-forming quartz sandstone and conglomerate formation, which rests unconformably on a surface of older gently- to steeply-dipping pre-Silurian age strata throughout the region. This ridge extends southward from the Hudson Valley along the eastern front of the Catskills. It forms the impressive caprock ridge of the Shawangunk Mountains west of New Paltz. To the south and west it becomes the prominent ridge-forming unit that crops out along the crest of Kittatinny Mountain in New Jersey.

Through Silurian time, the deposition of coarse alluvial sediments gave way to shallow marine fine-grained muds, and eventually to clear-water carbonate sediment accumulation with reefs formed from the accumulation of calcareous algae and the skeletal remains of coral, stromatoporoids, brachiopods, and other ancient marine fauna. The episodic eustatic rise and fall of sea level caused depositional environments to change or to shift laterally. As a result, the preserved faunal remains and the character and composition of the sedimentary layers deposited in any particular location varied through time. The textural or compositional variations of the strata, as well as the changing fossil fauna preserved, are used to define the numerous sedimentary formations of Silurian through Devonian age preserved throughout the region.

== See also ==
- Ebenezer Emmons, the geologist who first described the Taconic system
- Queenston Delta, a clastic wedge of sediment deposited west of the Taconics at that time
- Taconic Mountains
