= Wills Creek Formation =

Bedrock unit in the Eastern United States

- Stratigraphic range: Přídolí-Ludlow epoch ~422.9–418.1 Ma
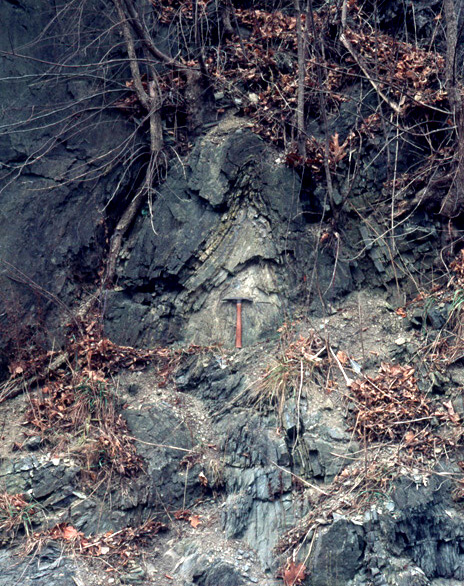
- Tight anticlinal fold in the Wills Creek Formation, along Route 22, Neff, Huntingdon County, Pennsylvania
- Type: sedimentary
- Underlies: Tonoloway Formation
- Overlies: Bloomsburg Formation and Williamsport Formation

Lithology
- Primary: Sandstone, shale
- Other: Siltstone, limestone, dolomite

Location
- Region: Appalachian Mountains
- Extent: Pennsylvania, Maryland, Virginia, West Virginia

Type section
- Named for: Wills Creek at Cumberland, Allegany County, Maryland
- Named by: P. R. Uhler, 1905

Wills Creek Formation is a mapped Silurian bedrock unit in Pennsylvania, Maryland, Virginia, and West Virginia.

== Description ==
The Wills Creek is defined as a moderately well bedded greenish-gray shale containing local limestone and sandstone zones, or more specifically as an olive to yellowish-gray, thin-bedded sandstone, calcareous shale, dolomite, argillaceous limestone, and sandstone. Red shale and siltstone occur in the lower part of the formation. The formation has a thickness between 450 feet and 600 feet in Maryland and 445 to 620 feet in Pennsylvania.

The Wills Creek forms the bedrock of the valley around and to the east of Lewistown, Pennsylvania.

=== Fossils ===
The Wills Creek Limestone contain fossils from the Pridoli to the Ludlow epoch, or 422.9 to 418.1 Ma.

Dean et al. (1985) describe the Wills Creek as sparsely fossiliferous.

Conodonts have been identified in the Wills Creek in Virginia (Ozarkodina snajdri crispa Zone).

=== Notable outcrops ===
- Type section at Wills Creek at Cumberland, Allegany County, Maryland
- Roundtop Hill, Maryland, along railroad grade

== Age ==
Relative age dating of the Wills Creek places it in the Silurian period. It rests conformably a top the Bloomsburg Formation and below the Tonoloway Formation.

== Economic use ==
The Wills Creek is a poor source of construction material and is only suitable as common fill.

== See also ==
- Geology of Pennsylvania
