= Geology of the Ozarks =

Ozarks
- Ozark Highlands; Ozark Mountains; Ozark Plateaus
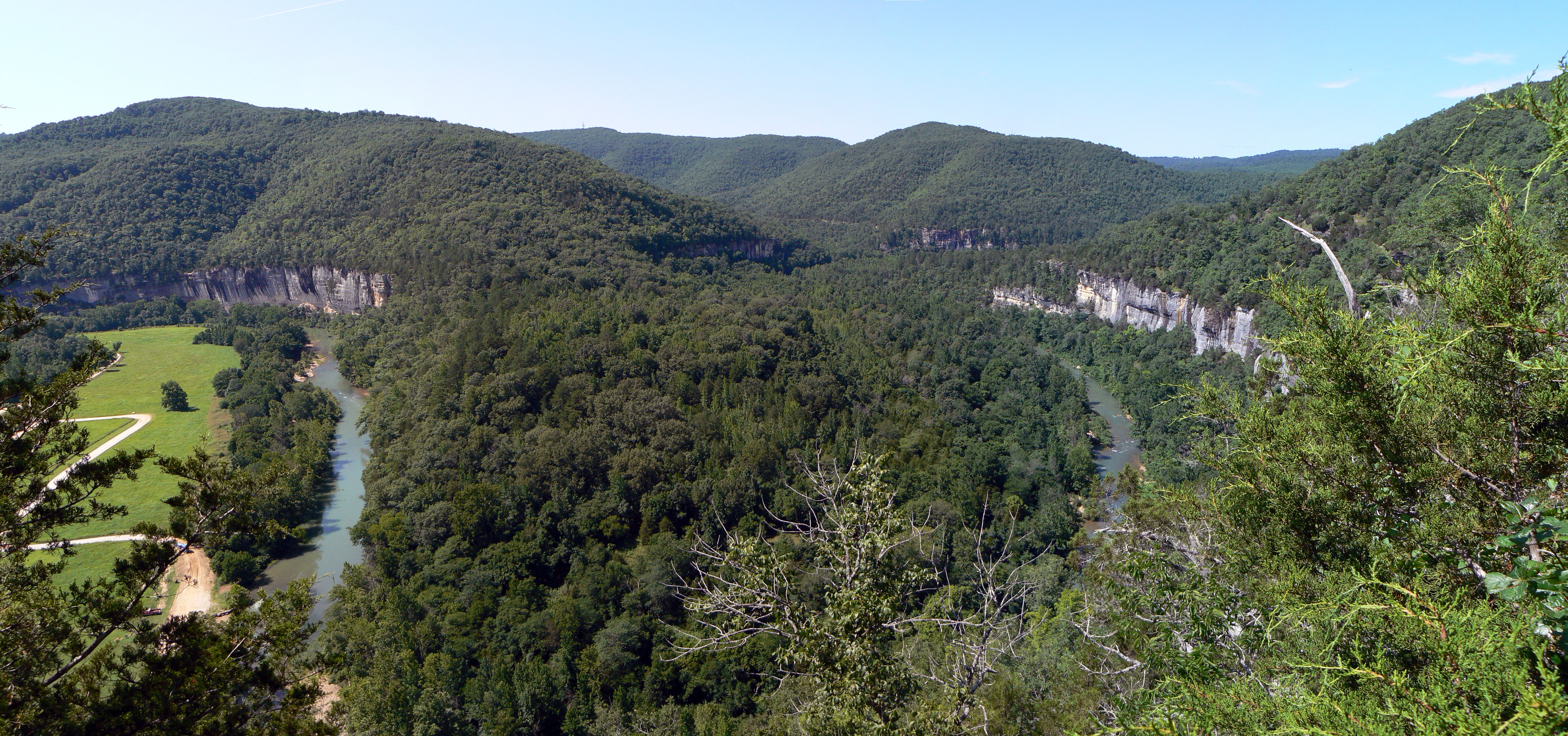
- View of the Ozarks from the Buffalo National River, Newton County, Arkansas

Highest point
- Peak: Wahzhazhe Summit (formerly known as Buffalo Lookout) 781 m (2,561 feet)
- Listing: Interior Highlands
- Coordinates: 37°10′N 92°30′W

Geography
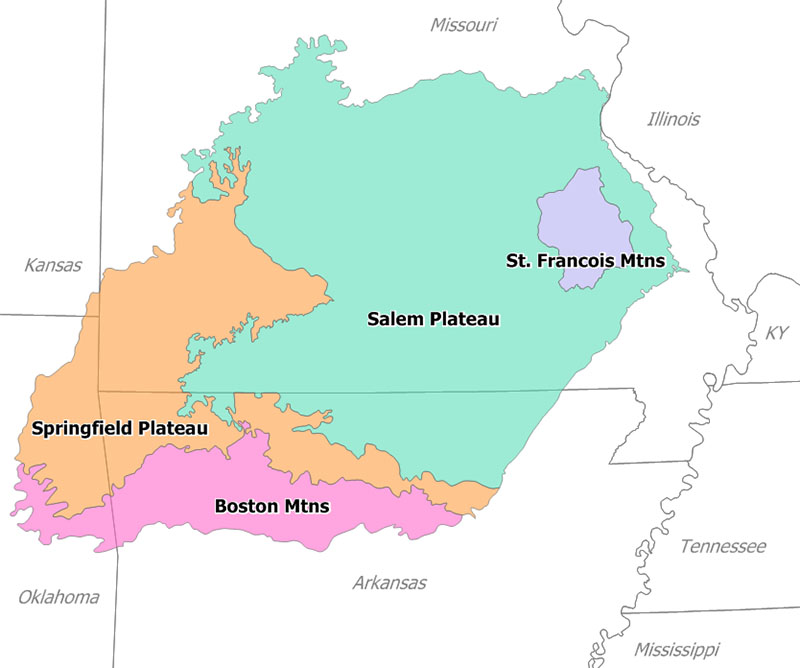
- Country: United States
- States: Arkansas; Kansas; Missouri; Oklahoma

Geology
- Rock age: Paleozoic to Proterozoic

The geology of the Ozarks includes the composition (including rock, minerals, and soils), structure, physical properties and the processes that shape the Ozark Plateau, a physiographic province in the United States covering much of Arkansas and Missouri, and small parts of Oklahoma and Kansas. The Ozarks cover nearly 47,000 square miles (120,000 km^{2}), making it the most extensive highland region between the Appalachians and Rockies. Together with the Ouachita Mountains, the region is designated as the U.S. Interior Highlands physiographic region by the United States Geological Survey.

Geologically, the area is a broad dome of limestone and dolomite, with some shale, sandstone and chert with an exposed Precambrian granite and porphyry core in the St. Francois Mountains. The Boston Mountains of Arkansas and Oklahoma are the highest mountain range in the Ozarks. The remainder of the Ozarks are within two broad sections with more rolling terrain known as Salem Plateau (named after Salem, Missouri, the largest geologic area of the Ozarks), or the Springfield Plateau.

The geology of the Ozarks dates back more than 300 million years to the Carboniferous period when the supercontinent Pangea was formed. During a period of mountain building plate collisions, the North American plate collided with Gondwana to uplift limestone and dolostone, as well as sandstone and chert. As these layers were eroded, an uneven surface of thick erosion-resistant layers remained, constituting today's Ozarks.

== Geology ==
The St. Francois Mountains in the northeastern Ozarks are the eroded remnants of an ancient range which form the geological core of the highland dome. The igneous and volcanic rocks of the St. Francois Mountains are the exposed remains of a Proterozoic mountain range hundreds of millions of years old. The remaining hills are the exposed portion of an extensive terrane (the Spavinaw terrane in part) of granitic and rhyolitic rocks dating from 1.485 to 1.350 bya that stretches from Ohio to western Oklahoma. The core of the range existed as an island in the Paleozoic seas. Reef complexes occur in the sedimentary layers surrounding this ancient island. These flanking reefs were points of concentration for later ore-bearing fluids which formed the rich lead-zinc ores that have been and continue to be mined in the area. The igneous and volcanic rocks extend at depth under the relatively thin veneer of Paleozoic sedimentary rocks and form the basal crust of the entire region.

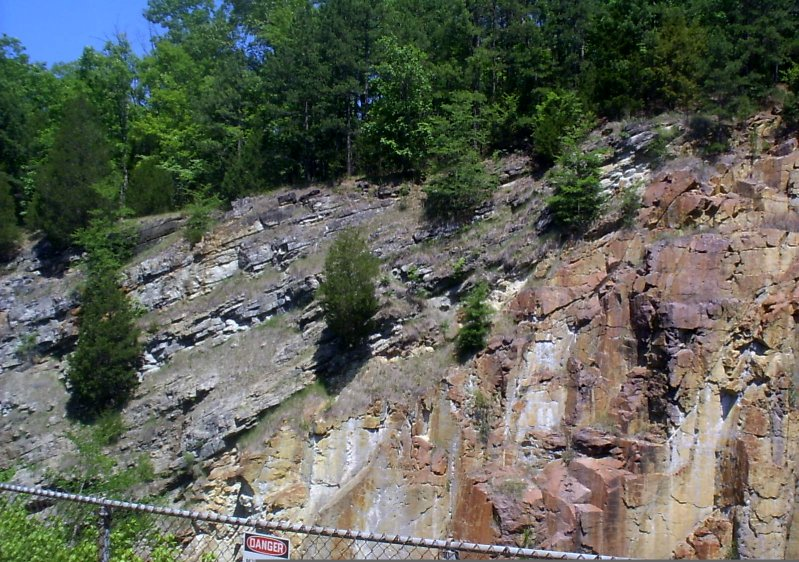
Grey dolomite laid down c. 500 mya nonconformally overlies reddish rhyolite that formed close to 1.5 bya in the St. Francois Mountains.

A major unconformity in the region attests that the Ozarks were above sea level for several hundred million years from the time of the volcanism in the Precambrian until the mid-Cambrian with an erosionally produced relief of up to 1,500 feet (460 m). The seas encroached during the late Cambrian producing the Lamotte Sandstone, 200 to 300 feet (61 to 91 m) thick, followed by carbonate sedimentation. Coral reefs formed around the granite and rhyolite islands in this Cambrian sea. This carbonate formation, the Bonneterre, now mostly dolomite, is exposed around the St. Francis Mountains, but extends in the subsurface throughout the Ozarks and reaches a thickness of 400 to 1,500 feet (120 to 460 m). The Bonneterre is overlain by 500 to 600 feet (150 to 180 m) of dolomite, often sandy, silty or cherty, forming the Elvins Group and the Potosi and Eminence formations. Withdrawal of the seas resulted in another unconformity during the latest Cambrian and early Ordovician periods. Hydrothermal mineralizing fluids formed the rich lead ore deposits of the Lead Belt during this time.

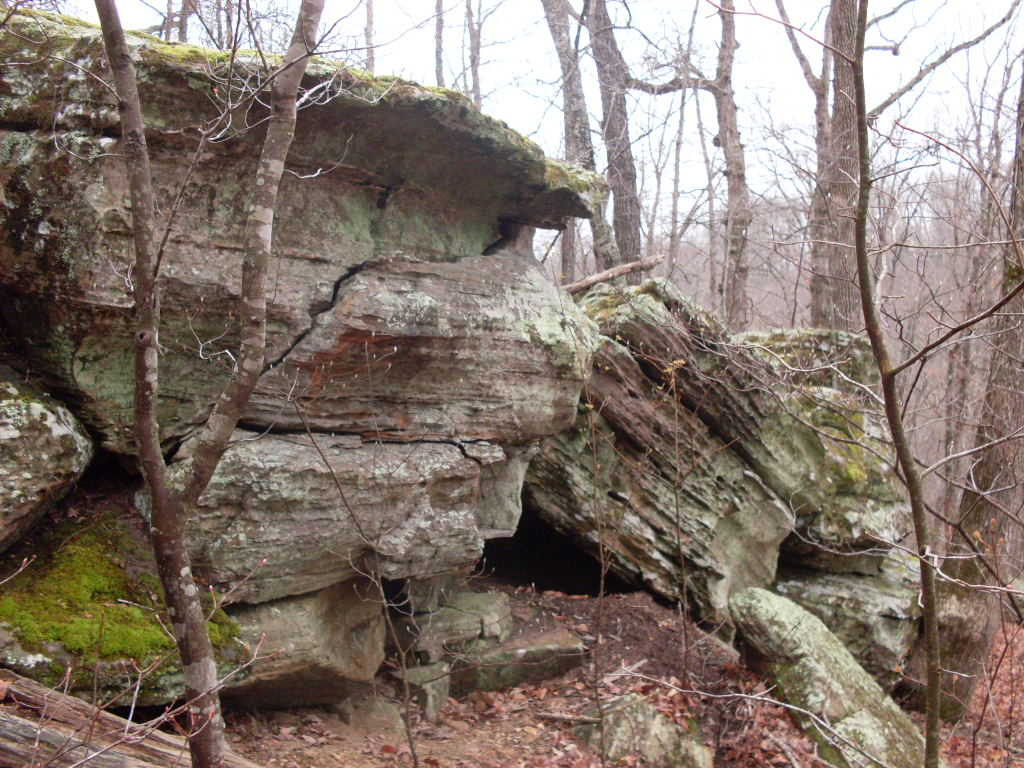
Outcrop of Roubidoux sandstone along a bluff in Douglas County, Missouri

Sedimentation resumed in the Ordovician with the deposition of the Gunter sandstone, the Gasconade dolomite and the prominent Roubidoux sandstone and dolomite. The sandstone of the Roubidoux forms prominent bluffs along the streams eroding into the southern part of the Salem Plateau. The Roubidoux and Gunter sandstones serve as significant aquifers when present in the subsurface. The source of the sands is considered to be the emerging Wisconsin Dome to the northeast. The Ozark region remained as a subsiding shallow carbonate shelf environment with a significant thickness of cherty dolomites such as the Jefferson City, Cotter and Powell formations.

Portions of the Ozark Plateau, the Springfield Plateau of southwest Missouri and northern Arkansas, are underlain by Mississippian cherty limestones locally referred to as "Boone chert", consisting of limestone and chert layers. These are eroded and form steep hills, valleys and bluffs.

The Boston Mountains are a high and deeply dissected plateau. The rocks of the region are essentially little disturbed, flat-lying sedimentary layers of Paleozoic age. The highest ridges and peaks are capped by Pennsylvanian sandstone such as the basal Atoka and the "Middle Bloyd". The deeply eroded valleys are cut into Mississippian limestone and below that layer Ordovician dolomite.

During the Pennsylvanian period, the Ozark Plateau was uplifted as a result of the Ouachita orogeny. During the late Paleozoic, the deep ocean basin that existed in central and southern Arkansas was lifted when South America collided with North America, creating the folded Ouachita Mountains and uplifting the Ozark plateau to the north.

== Physiographic subregions ==
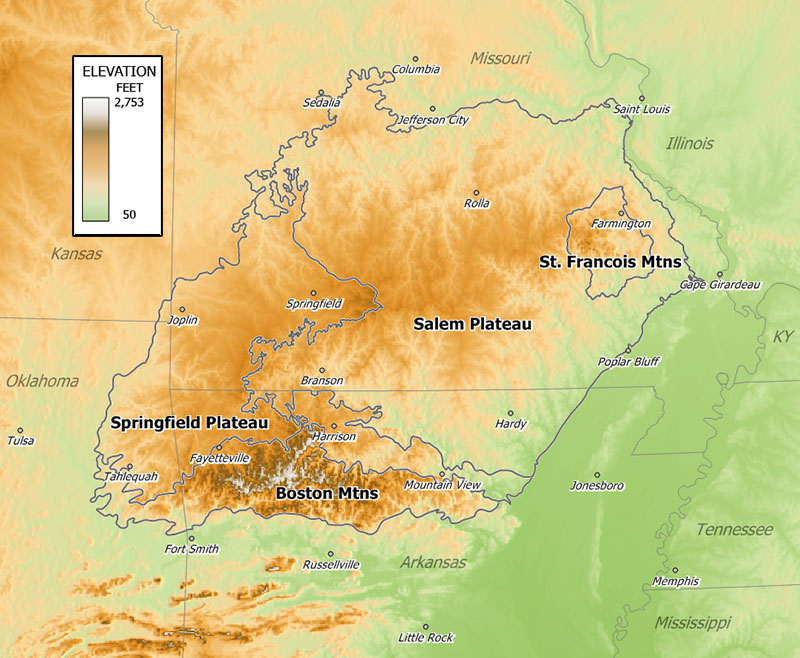
Elevation map of the Ozarks

The Ozarks consist of five physiographic subregions: the Boston Mountains of north Arkansas and Cookson Hills of east Oklahoma; the Springfield Plateau of southwest Missouri, northeast Oklahoma, northwest Arkansas and the southeast corner of Kansas, and including Springfield, Joplin and Monett/Aurora in Missouri, Tahlequah in Oklahoma, Fayetteville and Harrison in Arkansas, and Galena in Kansas; the White River Hills along the White River, including Branson and Mountain Home to Batesville; the Salem Plateau or Central Plateau, which includes a broad band across south central Missouri and north central Arkansas including the Lebanon, Salem and West Plains areas; the Courtois Hills of southeastern Missouri; the Osage-Gasconade Hills around the Lake of the Ozarks; the Saint Francois Mountains; and the Missouri River and Mississippi River border areas along the eastern and northeastern flanks.

Karst features such as springs, losing streams, sinkholes and caves are common in the limestones of the Springfield Plateau and abundant in the dolomite bedrock of the Salem Plateau and Boston Mountains. Missouri is known as "The Cave State" with over 7,300 recorded caves, second in number only to Tennessee. The majority of these caves are found in the Ozark counties. The Ozark Plateaus aquifer system affects groundwater movement in all areas except the igneous core of the St. Francois Mountains. Geographic features include limestone and dolomite glades, which are rocky, desert-like areas on hilltops. Kept open by periodic fires that limit growth of grasses and forbs in shallow soil, glades are home to collared lizards, tarantulas, scorpions, cacti and other species more typical of the Desert Southwest.

The Boston Mountains contain the highest elevations of the Ozarks, with peaks over 2,500 feet (760 m), and form some of the greatest relief of any formation between the Appalachians and Rocky Mountains. The Ouachita Mountains to the south rise a few hundred feet higher, but are not geographically associated with the Ozarks. The Boston Mountains portion of the Ozarks extends north of the Arkansas River Valley 20 to 35 miles (32 to 56 km), is approximately 200 miles (320 km) long, and is bordered by the Springfield and Salem Plateau to the north of the White River. Summits can reach elevations of just over 2,560 feet (780 m), with valleys 500 to 1,550 feet (150 to 470 m) deep. Turner Ward Knob is the highest named peak. Found in western Newton County, Arkansas, its elevation is 2,463 feet (751 m). Nearby, five unnamed peaks have elevations at or slightly above 2,560 feet (780 m). Drainage is primarily to the White River, with the exception of the Illinois River, although there also is considerable drainage from the south slopes of the Boston Mountains to the Arkansas River. Major streams of this type include Lee Creek, Frog Bayou, Mulberry River, Spadra Creek, Big Piney Creek, Little Piney Creek, Illinois Bayou, Point Remove Creek, and Cadron Creek. Many Ozark waterways have their headwaters in the uplands of the Boston formation, including the Buffalo, Kings, Mulberry, Little Red and White rivers.

Topography is mostly gently rolling in the Springfield and Salem plateaus, whereas the Saint Francois Mountains are more rugged. Although the Springfield formation's surface is primarily Mississippian limestone and chert, the Salem Plateau is made of older Ordovician dolomites, limestones, and sandstones. Both are rife with karst topography and form long, flat plains. The formations are separated by steep escarpments that dramatically interrupt the rolling hills. Although much of the Springfield Plateau has been denuded of the surface layers of the Boston Mountains, large remnants of these younger layers are present throughout the southern end of the formation, possibly suggesting a peneplain process. The Springfield Plateau drains through wide, mature streams ultimately feeding the White River.
