= Geology of Illinois =

The geology of Illinois includes extensive deposits of marine sedimentary rocks from the Palaeozoic, as well as relatively minor contributions from the Mesozoic and Cenozoic. Ice age glaciation left a wealth of glacial topographic features throughout the state.

== Precambrian Geology ==
Precambrian rocks of Illinois are deeply buried by 2000–13000 feet (610–3960 m) of later sediments. Drilling has revealed these rocks to be primarily intrusive felsic igneous rocks, though some extrusive felsic rocks have also been recovered from boreholes.

Precambrian rocks of Illinois are highly faulted; tectonic extension and related thermal subsidence have led to the formation of two major sedimentary basins. These basins, termed the Illinois Basin and Michigan Basin, allowed for extensive deposition of sedimentary rock during the Palaeozoic Era. The Illinois Basin is a northwest–southeast asymmetrical structural basin that is filled with more than 4000 meters of Paleozoic sedimentary rocks. The basin covers most of Illinois, and extends into western Indiana and western Kentucky. The basin is bounded to the north by the Mississippi River and the Kankakee Arch, to the east by the Cincinnati Arch, and to the south by the Ozark uplift and Pascola Arch.

== Palaeozoic Geology ==
For much of the Palaeozoic, Illinois was located much further south than today, instead being near the equator; it was also underwater for much of this time, forming a shallow continental sea.

=== Cambrian ===
The oldest Palaeozoic rocks in Illinois are those of the upper Cambrian Mt. Simon Sandstone, the most basal of which are interpreted as being braided river deposits, while the remainder of the formation seems to represent marine tidal environments. These tidal environments included both tidal channels and tidal flats; desiccation cracks and ripple marks preserve surface features of the time. Overlying the Mt. Simon Sandstone are the Eau Claire Formation, Ironton-Galesville Sandstone, Franconia Formation, Potosi and Eminence dolomites, and Jordan Sandstone; of these, only the Potosi is exposed at the surface, in Ogle and Lee Counties . These rocks suggest a gradual increase in local sea level over the time of the Cambrian; they also suggest that most sediment was being transported to the area from the North. Fossils are uncommon in the Cambrian of Illinois, but trilobites, brachiopods, gastropods, and trace fossils of worms have been discovered.

=== Ordovician ===
Rocks of Ordovician age are best exposed in the Northwestern part of the state, largely in the Driftless Area (see below). Ordovician rocks in the state are separated from Cambrian and Silurian rocks by unconformities. Most of the Ordovician saw continued offshore marine deposition throughout the entirety of the state; however, Southern parts of the state saw some deposition of shallow-water carbonates and evaporites, indicating that some areas of the state were significantly shallower than others, and even exposed above water at times.

Ordovician rocks in Illinois are divided into three series, each separated by an unconformity; from oldest to youngest, these are the Canadian, Champlainian, and Cincinnatian series.

Ordovician features in Illinois include the now-buried Glasford Structure in Peoria County, a crater caused by a meteorite impact roughly 455 million years ago. It and a similar buried crater in Cook County, the Des Plaines crater, have been associated with the Ordovician Meteor Event.

=== Silurian ===
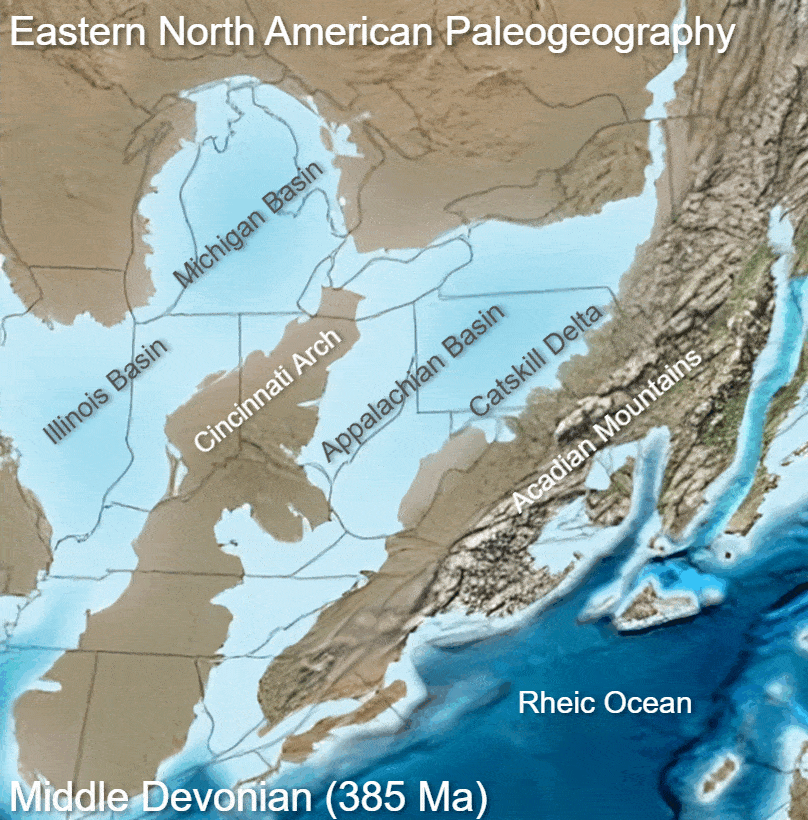
Paleogeographic reconstruction showing the Illinois Basin area during the Middle Devonian period.

Almost all Silurian rocks in Illinois are deep-water limestone and dolomite deposits; reef habitats were common, and fossils of reef organisms are locally highly abundant, including corals, brachiopods, crinoids, stromatoporoids, and bryozoans.

=== Devonian ===
An unconformity separates the Devonian rocks of Illinois from those of the Silurian; the oldest Devonian rocks in the state are therefore from the middle part of the period. These rocks are also primarily marine limestones and shales, with the upper Devonian rocks of the state being carbon-rich black shales; some evaporite deposits are also present. There is evidence of significant intervals of hypersaline water in the middle Devonian in Illinois. Fossils include brachiopods, trilobites, corals, bryozoans, algaes, and conodonts.

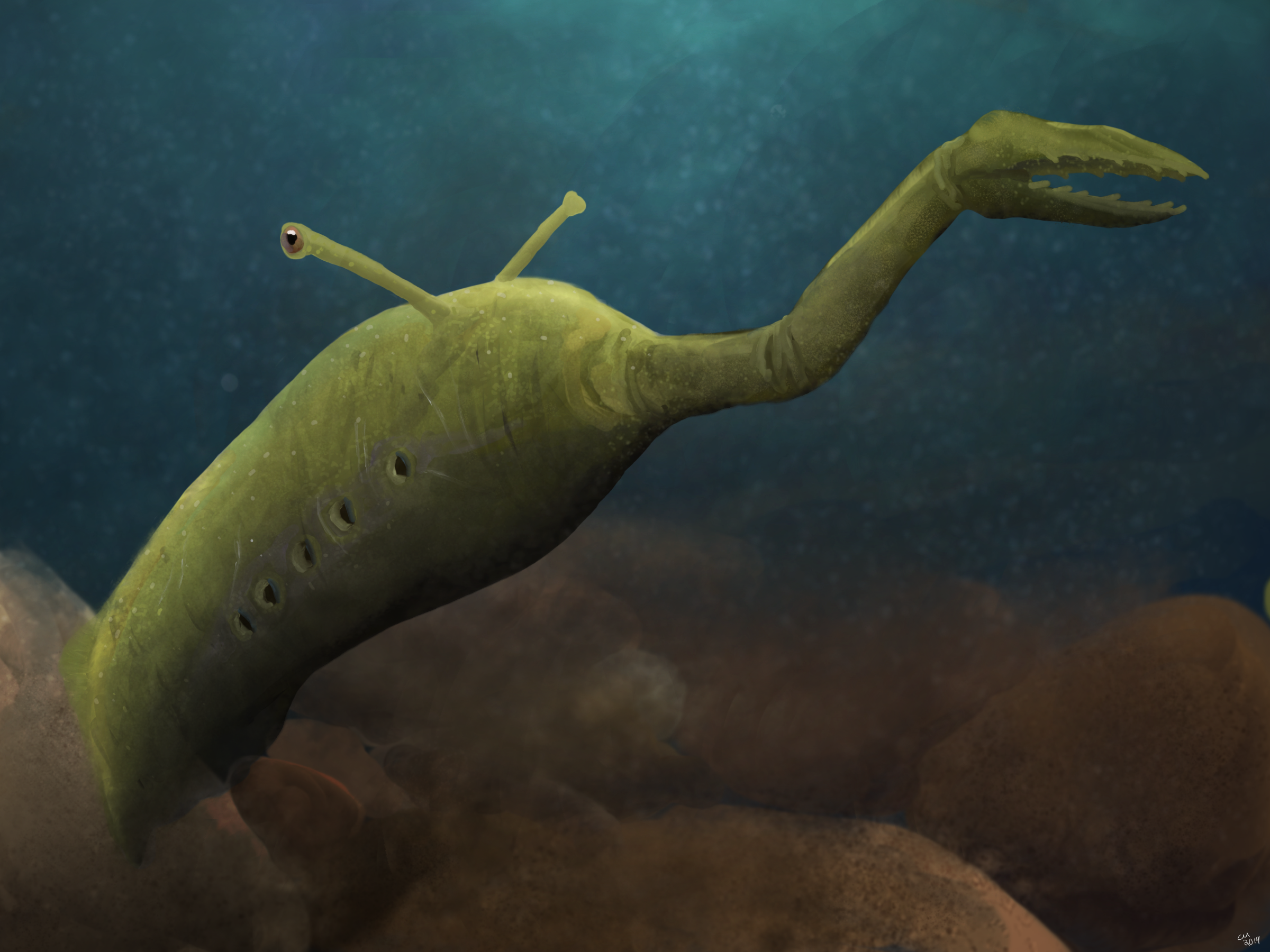
Artist's reconstruction of Tullimonstrum, Illinois's state fossil.

=== Carboniferous ===
The earliest Carboniferous rocks sit conformably on top of the youngest Devonian in Illinois; Carboniferous rocks in the state are areally extensive, regionally very well-exposed, and form a large percentage of the state's bedrock. Illinois remained marine for much of the Carboniferous, with limestones making up most of the rock deposited; however, sandstones, shales, cherts, siltstones, and coals are also present; these indicate marine conditions, but also terrestrial swamp conditions. Carboniferous fossils include the world-famous Mazon Creek fauna, home to the Illinois's State Fossil, Tullimonstrum gregarium. A significant unconformity separates Mississippian from Pennsylvanian strata.

== Mesozoic Geology ==
Mesozoic rocks are overall poorly exposed in Illinois; those present are Cretaceous in age and only seen in extreme southern parts of the state. They are largely terrestrial sands and gravels, though one marine unit, the Owl Creek Formation, indicates that the Western Interior Seaway covered parts of the state at one point in time.

== Cenozoic Geology ==
=== Paleogene ===
Paleocene rocks are present only in the extreme south of Illinois, in Alexander and Pulaski counties. These rocks make up the Clayton Formation and Porters Creek Formation; both units are marine. The Porters Creek Formation preserves fossils of molluscs, sharks, and bony fishes.

The only Eocene rocks in the state, exposed only in Pulaski County, are those of the Wilcox Formation. They were deposited in an ancient river delta.

=== Neogene ===
Pliocene deposits in Illinois consist of river-deposited gravel beds. The Mounds Gravel lies in the southern part of the state, and the Grover Gravel is found as a scattering of deposits throughout the northern part of the state.

=== Quaternary ===
During the Quaternary period, Illinois was subject to multiple intervals of glaciation; over 90% of Illinois was formerly covered by glaciers, leaving a variety of glacial landscape features.

The Mississippi River, fed by ice-sheet melt and water from glacial lakes, cut a deep valley as it flowed through the region. The formation of this valley has been constrained as having occurred between 2.5 and 0.8 million years ago.

Among the oldest glacial features is the Buffalo Hart Moraine, located in Logan County. This is a terminal glacial moraine; however, unlike most other moraines in the state, it is not Wisconsinan in age but rather Illinoisan, and as such is roughly 125,000 years old.

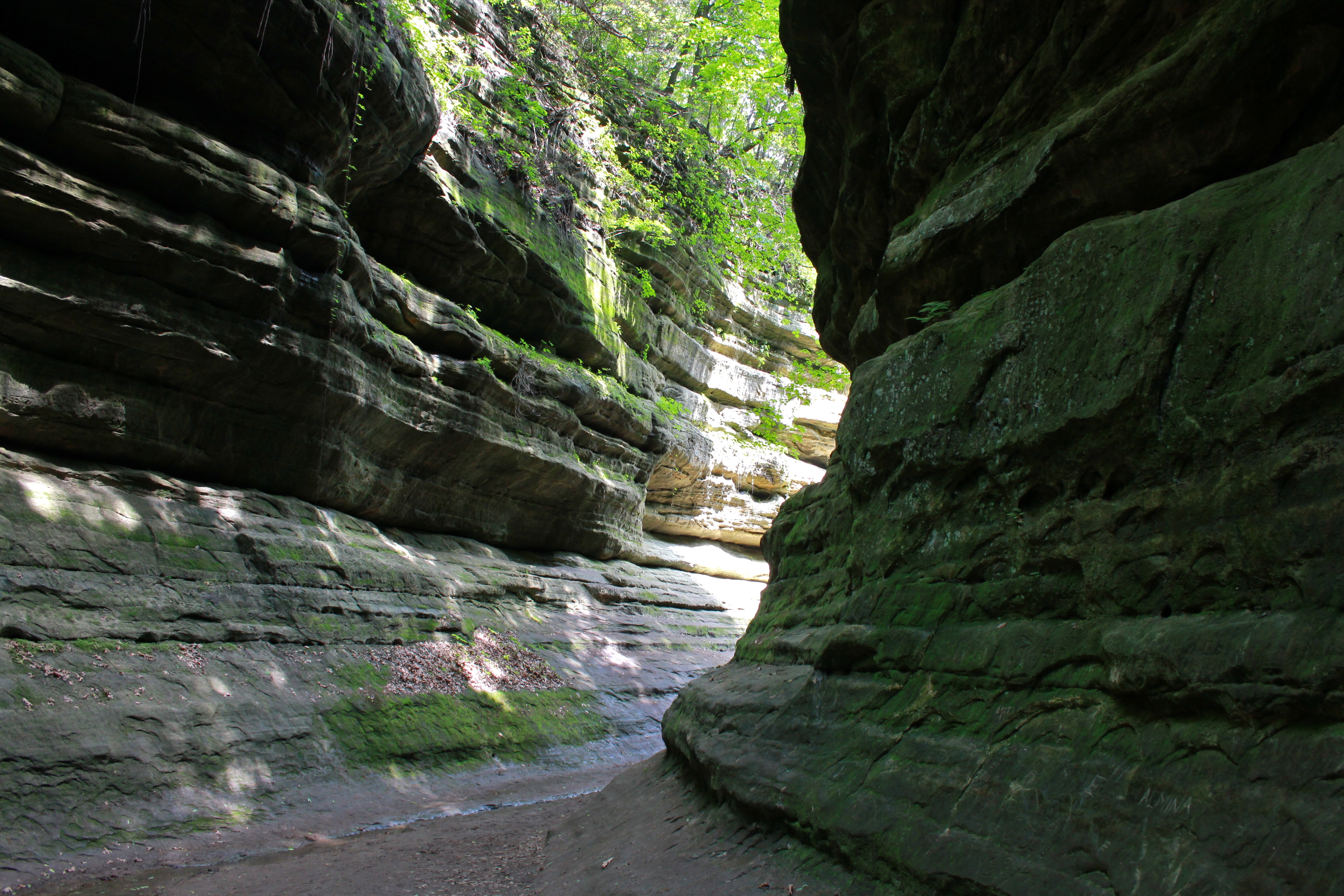
Canyons at Starved Rock State Park were carved by the Kankakee Torrent.

Kankakee River State Park, located in Kankakee County, contains evidence of the catastrophic Kankakee Torrent that occurred roughly 19,000 years ago. This event occurred when the dam of a glacial lake located in what is now the Lower Peninsula of Michigan failed catastrophically, leading to a massive influx of water down the channel of the modern Kankakee River. Evidence of this flood can be seen in the high rubble bars that run parallel to the modern river. The torrent also cut through the bedrock of the Joliet Dolomite; this caused the formation of waterfalls in tributaries of the Kankakee as their waters flowed over the hard bedrock and fell down into the canyon cut by the torrent. The Rock Creek Canyon is home to one such waterfall, which is eroding upstream at a rate of 3 inches (7.5 cm) per year

The most obvious glacial feature in Illinois is Lake Michigan, the basin of which was carved out by glaciers. As the glaciers receded they left a large number of recessional moraines; among the more visible moraines in the state is the Bloomington Moraine, a Wisconsinan terminal moraine that can be seen in Bureau County. This moraine is also associated with a large number of eskers and a substantial glacial outwash plain; also associated with this terminal moraine is a series of sand dunes created from sand deriving from glacial outwash. These are primarily parabolic and longitudinal dunes. Located to the Southwest the Bloomington Moraine is a large, very flat plain; this area is in fact the lakebed of Glacial Lake Pontiac, which drained about 17,000 years ago.

Glacial Park, in McHenry County, preserves a wealth of glacial landscape features, including a delta kame named Camelback Kame, as well as wetlands in three glacial kettles—one marsh, one bog, and one fen.

The very northwesternmost corner of the state lies in the Driftless Area, so named because it was never covered by glaciers. This area is marked by much more dramatic topography than in the rest of the state, due to the incision of the Mississippi River and subsequent reworking of river systems during the Quaternary Glaciation. In this area, vertical cliffs have been cut into the resistant dolostone of the Ordovician Dunleith formation by rivers. Apple River Canyon State Park shows some of this dramatic topography in the eponymous canyon; the tributaries of the Apple River enter the main channel pointing upstream, indicating a reversal in flow direction due to the advance of the Illinoian glacier.

== See also ==
- Paleontology in Illinois
- Illinoian (stage)
