= Kerbel Formation =

Geological formation in Ohio

- Stratigraphic range: Cambrian
- Type: Formation
- Underlies: Knox Dolomite
- Overlies: Eau Claire Formation

Location
- Country: United States
- Extent: Ohio

The Kerbel Formation is a geologic formation in Ohio. It dates back to the Cambrian. Named by Adriaan Janssens in 1973, it has been interpreted as either a prograding delta or a tidal environment.

The Kerbel Formation's thickness is about 50 meters. It consists of sandstones changing from fine-grained at the bottom to coarse-grained at the top. These sandstones were previously assigned to the Dresbach Formation or Franconia Formation and found in multiple locations between eastern Wisconsin and northwestern Ohio / south-eastern Michigan (through northeastern Illinois and northern Indiana).

The Kerbel Formation is correlated to the Galesville Formation and Ironton Formation of Illinois and is equivalent to Eau Claire Formation in western Ohio (and Conasauga Formation in eastern Ohio). John Rodgers included the sandstones into Conasauga Group in the 1953. The eastern Kentucky sandstones correlated to Kerbel Formation were also described as part of Knox Group. In eastern Ohio the Kerbel Formation turns dolomitic and thins out into Knox Dolomite.

== Sources ==
- Banjade, Bharat (2011). Subsurface Facies Analysis of the Cambrian Conasauga Formation and Kerbel Formation in East - Central Ohio (Master of Science in Geology thesis). Bowling Green State University.
- Ryder, R.T. (1992). Stratigraphic Framework of Cambrian and Ordovician Rocks in the Central Appalachian Basin from Morrow County, Ohio, to Pendleton County, West Virginia. Bulletin (US Geological Survey). U.S. Government Printing Office.
- Janssens, A. (1973). Stratigraphy of the Cambrian and Lower Ordovician Rocks in Ohio. Bulletin / State of Ohio, Department of Natural Resources, Division of Geological Survey. State of Ohio, Division of Geological Survey.
- Generalized Stratigraphic Chart for Ohio
