= Ozark Highlands (ecoregion) =

Level III ecoregion in four U.S. states

Ozark Highlands ecoregion
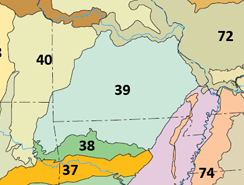
- Level III ecoregions in the region, with the Ozark Highlands ecoregion marked as (39) (full map)

Ecology
- Borders: Boston Mountains (38); Central Irregular Plains (40); Interior River Valleys and Hills (72); Mississippi Alluvial Plain (73)

Geography
- Area: 41,078 km^{2} (15,860 mi^{2})
- Country: United States
- States: Arkansas; Kansas; Missouri; Oklahoma
- Climate type: Humid subtropical (Cwa)

The Ozark Highlands is a Level III ecoregion designated by the Environmental Protection Agency (EPA) in four U.S. states. Most of the region is within Missouri, with a part in Arkansas and small sections in Oklahoma and Kansas. It is the largest subdivision of the region known as the Ozark Mountains, less rugged in comparison to the Boston Mountains in Arkansas, the highest part of the Ozarks.

The Ozark Highlands ecoregion has been subdivided into eleven Level IV ecoregions, seven of which lie completely within Missouri.

== Level IV ecoregions ==
=== Springfield Plateau (39a) ===
The Springfield Plateau is the only Ozark Highland Level IV ecoregion within all four states. The nearly level to rolling Springfield Plateau is underlain by cherty limestone of the Mississippian Boone Formation and Burlington Limestone; it is less rugged and wooded than Ecoregions 38, 39b, and 39c, and lacks the Ordovician dolomite and limestone of Ecoregions 39c and 39d. Karst features, such as sinkholes and caves, are common. Cold, perennial, spring-fed streams occur. Upland potential natural vegetation is primarily oak–hickory and also oak–hickory–pine forests; savannas and tallgrass prairies also occurred and were maintained by fire. Today, most of the forest and almost all of the prairie have been replaced by agriculture or expanding residential areas. Poultry, cattle, and hog farming are primary land uses; pastureland and hayland are common. Application of poultry litter to agricultural fields is a non-point source that can impair water quality. Total suspended solids and turbidity values in streams are usually low, but total dissolved solids and hardness values are high. The region is a total of 4,110 square miles (10,600 km^{2}), with 66% in Missouri, 23% in Arkansas, 11% in Oklahoma, and the remainder (53 square miles (140 km^{2})) in Kansas.

=== Dissected Springfield Plateau–Elk River Hills (39b) ===
The Dissected Springfield Plateau–Elk River Hills are underlain by cherty limestone of the Mississippian Boone Formation and contain many karst features. Cold, perennial, spring-fed streams occur. It is more rugged and wooded than the lithologically similar Springfield Plateau and the lithologically dissimilar Central Plateau. Potential natural vegetation is oak–hickory and oak–hickory–pine forests. Shortleaf pine grows on the thin, cherty soils of steep slopes, and is more common than in Ecoregion 39a, 39c, and 39d. Scattered limestone glades occur, but are less extensive than on the dolomites of the lithologically distinct Ecoregion 39c. Today, Ecoregion 39b remains dominated by forest and woodland. Logging, livestock farming, woodland grazing, recreation, quarrying, and housing are primary land uses. The region is a total of 4,110 square miles (10,600 km^{2}), with 50% in Arkansas, 37% in Missouri, and the balance in Oklahoma.

=== White River Hills (39c) ===
The forested White River Hills ecoregion is a highly dissected portion of the Salem Plateau that is underlain by cherty Ordovician dolomite and limestone. Soils are usually thin, rocky, steep, and nonarable. Flat land is uncommon except along the White River. Ecoregion 39c is lithologically unlike another highly dissected portion of the Ozarks, Ecoregion 39b, where Mississippian cherty limestone of the Boone Formation predominates. Clear, cold, perennial, spring-fed streams are common, but dry valleys occur. Potential natural vegetation is oak–hickory forest, oak–hickory–pine forest, and cedar glades. Glades are more extensive than elsewhere in Arkansas, and occur on thin, droughty soils derived from carbonates. Pine is most common on steep, thin, cherty soils. It includes Table Rock Lake, Bull Shoals Lake, Lake Norfork, and Beaver Lake. Turbidity and total suspended solids are usually low in its streams and rivers, but total dissolved solids and hardness values are high. The ecoregion covers 4,739 square miles (12,270 km^{2}) within Arkansas and Missouri, with 73% in Missouri.

=== Central Plateau (39d) ===
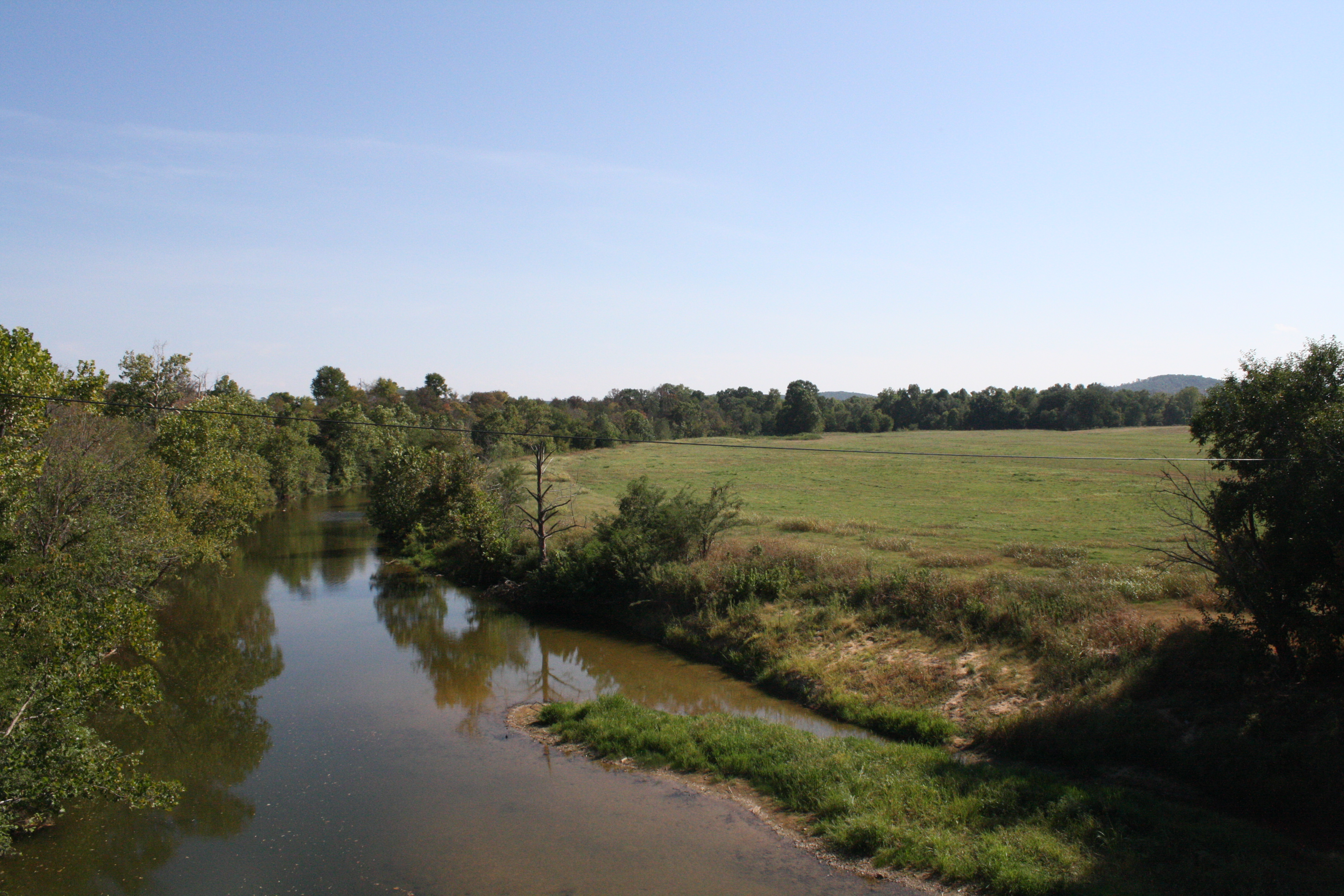
Strawberry River and hayfield of the Central Plateau at the AR 56 bridge in Franklin, AR

The Central Plateau is an undulating to hilly portion of the Salem Plateau that is dominated by agriculture. Ecoregion 39d is largely underlain by cherty Ordovician dolomite and limestone; it is lithologically distinct from another slightly dissected part of the Ozarks, the Springfield Plateau. Karst features occur. The Central Plateau is less rugged and wooded than Ecoregions 38, 39b, and 39c. Natural vegetation is oak–hickory forest, oak–hickory–pine forest (often on soils derived from sandstone), barrens (on thin soils), and scattered cedar glades (on shallow, rocky, droughty soils from dolomite or limestone). Today, pastureland, hayland, and housing are common, but remnant forests and savannas occur in steeper areas. Turbidity, total suspended solids, total dissolved solids, and hardness values are often higher than in Ecoregions 39a and 39c. The largest Level IV ecoregion, it covers 9,454 square miles (24,490 km^{2}) within Arkansas and Missouri, with 72% in Missouri.

=== Osage/Gasconade Hills (39e) ===
The Osage/Gasconade Hills ecoregion is more densely forested and dissected than the lower relief Central Plateau to the south. Steep slopes and narrow ridges of carbonate and sandstone underlie soils which are rocky and thin. Outcrops of Gasconade Formation with some sandstone are found throughout the region along with areas of Roubidoux Formation, Jefferson City-Cotter dolomites and scattered Mississippian limestone outliers in the western portion. Numerous caves, springs, calcareous wet meadows, losing streams, and streams with entrenched valley meanders are common. Streams flow generally northward and drain into the Missouri River. The potential natural vegetation is predominantly mixed oak forest, with oak-pine forest and some pine forests in the southeast areas of the region and some small limestone and sandstone glades. The northeastern edges of this region are transitional and blend into the Interior River Valleys and Hills ecoregion. The region covers 5,040 square miles (13,100 km^{2}) within Missouri.

=== St. Francois Knobs and Basins (39f) ===
The St. Francois Knobs and Basins ecoregion contains the oldest geologic formations in the state and has a different landscape than surrounding regions. The igneous bedrock knobs of Precambrian granite, rhyolite, and intermediate rocks rise 200–900 feet (61–274 m) above the intervening basins which are underlain by Cambrian sedimentary rocks, primarily carbonate with some sandstone. This is the only region within the Ozark Highlands that generally lacks karst topography. Streams are smaller than in neighboring regions but have a greater fall distance because of the steep topography. Sedimentary-derived soils may be stone free, not cherty as in neighboring regions. The soil mantle is generally shallow with low fertility, except in the basins, which have a thicker, more loamy layer. The potential natural vegetation includes scrub oak, post oak, and blackjack oak forests and glade areas, along with prairie in the basins and valleys. Most of the region is in forest and woodland, with cleared land limited to the small basin-like valleys used for pasture and limited cropland. Lead mining has been an important activity in this region for over two centuries and significant scarification has occurred. Other mineral resources include granite and, to a limited extent, silver, copper, and cobalt, by-products of lead mining. The region covers 1,590 square miles (4,100 km^{2}) within Missouri.

=== Meramec River Hills (39g) ===
The Meramec River Hills ecoregion is deeply dissected, with steep-sided hills and chert-covered ridges. The hills tend to be more rugged than in the Osage/Gasconade Hills ecoregion to the northwest. Land use is mainly timber and recreation, with some pastureland for grazing, and barite and iron mining in the southeast. The potential natural vegetation in this region is shortleaf pine-oak forest and woodland, with a greater oak concentration than in forests of the Current River Hills to the south. Streams in this region drain northeast into the Mississippi River. The region covers 1,776 square miles (4,600 km^{2}) within Missouri.

=== Current River Hills (39h) ===
In many ways, the physiography of the Current River Hills ecoregion is similar to that of the Meramec River Hills to the north. However, this region has many endemic species not found in other Ozark regions and the potential natural vegetation here has a greater pine concentration than in regions to the north and west. The region underwent intensive timber cutting in the early decades of the twentieth century. It now sustains major recreational activities. The stream valleys contain numerous, large, high-quality springs and water quality is generally better than elsewhere in Missouri. Caves and losing streams are common. Streams drain southeast into the Mississippi River. The region covers 3,114 square miles (8,070 km^{2}) within Missouri.

=== Eastern Ozark Border (39i) ===
The Eastern Ozark Border ecoregion is a transitional area between the interior ecoregions of the Ozark Highlands and the Interior River Valleys and Hills ecoregion to the east. Moderately dissected hills and sheer bluffs typify the region. Soils can be rocky and thin on steep slopes, with areas of claypan or loess similar to the Black River Hills Border to the southwest. Compared to the Central Plateau, however, the loess mantle in this region tends to be deeper and more expansive on the uplands. Potential natural vegetation is a mix of oak forest, savanna, glades, and prairies. Land cover is variable with forests, woodlands, and cleared areas in cropland and pasture. This ecoregion has more cropland agriculture than adjoining Ozark regions. The region covers 1,835 square miles (4,750 km^{2}) within Missouri.

=== Black River Hills Border (39j) ===
The Black River Hills Border is a transitional region with broad, flat inter-stream divides and moderately dissected hills. There is significantly less relief than in neighboring hill regions in the Ozark Highlands but greater relief than in the southeastern Mississippi Alluvial Plain. Soils are thin and rocky on steeper slopes, with claypan and loess in more level areas. More soils are derived from sandstone and loess, in contrast to interior Ozark Highlands regions which have soils mainly derived from dolomite. Potential natural vegetation is a mix between Ozark species on uplands and Mississippi Alluvial Plain species in river bottoms. Land cover is predominantly forest and woodland with a scattering of pastureland and cropland in the cleared valley bottoms. This region has the highest precipitation in the Ozark Highlands with 44–46 inches (110–120 cm) per year. The region covers 1,076 square miles (2,790 km^{2}) within Missouri.

=== Prairie Ozark Border (39k) ===
The Prairie Ozark Border ecoregion shares characteristics with both the Wooded Osage Plains and adjacent regions within the Ozark Highlands. Topography is mostly smooth to gently sloping plains, and soils, derived from loess and cherty limestone, tend to support more cropland than other Ozark regions. The area shares the same bedrock, Mississippian to the north, and Ordovician to the south, as nearby Ozark regions. Streambeds are generally rocky and tend to be more Ozarkian in structure than those found in the Wooded Osage Plains to the west. The biotic composition and potential natural vegetation reflect the transition from a predominantly prairie landscape in the northwest to a more wooded landscape of the interior Ozark Highlands. The region covers 842 square miles (2,180 km^{2}) within Missouri.

== See also ==
- Ecoregions defined by the EPA and the Commission for Environmental Cooperation:
  - List of ecoregions in North America (CEC)
  - List of ecoregions in the United States (EPA)
  - List of ecoregions in Arkansas
  - List of ecoregions in Kansas
  - List of ecoregions in Missouri
  - List of ecoregions in Oklahoma
- The conservation group World Wildlife Fund maintains an alternate classification system:
  - List of ecoregions (WWF)
  - List of ecoregions in the United States (WWF)
