= Michael Richards (sculptor) =

African-American artist (1963–2001)

- Born: August 2, 1963; New York City, US
- Died: September 11, 2001 (aged 38); North Tower, World Trade Center, New York City, U.S.
- Notable work: Tar Baby vs. St. Sebastian

Michael Rolando Richards (August 2, 1963 – September 11, 2001) was an African-American artist and sculptor of Jamaican and Costa Rican ancestry who was killed during the September 11 attacks while in his art studio on the 92nd floor of the World Trade Center's North Tower. He explored his African-American history and identity through sculpture, conceptual art, and installation pieces. Influenced by the Black Arts Movement of the 1970s, Richards delved into African-American history and folklore for images that would expose the contradictions of American society. Richards worked primarily in bronze.

== Early life ==
Richards was born in Brooklyn, New York, and raised in Kingston, Jamaica. He graduated with honors from Excelsior High School and earned a Bachelor of Fine Arts from Queens College and a Master of Arts from New York University. From 1992-93, he participated in the Independent Study Program at the Whitney Museum of American Art.

== Career ==
He explored his African-American history and identity through sculpture, conceptual art, and installation pieces. Influenced by the Black Arts Movement of the 1970s, Richards delved into Black American history and folklore for images that would expose the contradictions of American society. Richards worked primarily in bronze.

He was an artist-in-residence at the Studio Museum in Harlem in 1996 and showed his work there in "Passages" in 1999. Richards received several fellowships during his lifetime.

"Michael started his National Foundation for the Advancement in the Arts (NFAA) residency (1997-1999) housed within the Art Center/South Florida (later Oolite Arts) residency." -Voices in Contemporary Art website (An Alchemist At Work, July 6, 2016)

Oolite Arts would later create the Michael Richards Award (2018). Michael Richards, to whom this award pays tribute, was an incisive, provocative, and poetic artist whose body of work primarily addresses racial inequity and social injustice.

In 2000, he received the Franconia Sculpture Park / Jerome Fellowship. It was during this time that he created the "Are You Down" piece that is now displayed in the park. He was also a recipient of a studio residency from the Lower Manhattan Cultural Council. This fellowship provided him with his "Studio in the Sky" in the World Trade Center.

His first work, entitled Are You Down?, is located in Franconia, Minnesota, at Franconia Sculpture Park. Franconia Sculpture Park is a community arts organization that provides residence and work space to emerging and established artists. Are You Down? featured three sculptures of Tuskegee Airmen and was best described by Glenn Gordon:

[A] tableau of three nearly life-sized human figures. Three parachutists fallen from the sky, they sit disconsolate on the ground in what appear (once the snow has melted to reveal them) to be puddles of tar. Backs turned to one another, the figures form a triangle about twelve feet on a side. Within the triangle is a large bulls-eye flat on the ground, the target where the men had aimed to land. Their heads clad in close-fitting leather aviator helmets, their shirts torn from the drop, the figures represent three downed aviators from the storied, all-black Tuskegee Airmen's Squadron of the Second World War, men whose images Richards (using himself as his model) returned to in his work obsessively, again and again. They speak not so much of the exhilaration of flight as of dreams of freedom crashed to Earth.

Though originally cast in fiberglass, it was recast in bronze in 2012. to serve as a permanent memorial to Richards and his work. This has made it the only permanent sculpture in the park. The New York Times noted the dual meaning of the title: "'Are You Down?' means, 'Are you with me?' It's also a call to a missing pilot."

In a 1997 interview, Richards said that "the idea of flight relates to my use of pilots and planes, but it also references the Black church, the idea of being lifted up, enraptured, or taken up to a safe place — to a better world."

Richards's 1999 sculpture Tar Baby vs. St. Sebastian featured a Tuskegee Airman portrayed as St. Sebastian and was a part of his "Tuskegee Airmen Collection" that he spent over ten years creating. St. Sebastian was an early Christian martyr and the patron saint of soldiers and athletes because of his physical endurance. St. Sebastian was executed by being shot full of arrows for protecting captured Christians he was supposed to imprison. However, in this sculpture, it was a Tuskegee Airman who was being pierced by multiple airplanes. Tar Baby vs. St. Sebastian measures seven feet tall and is made out of resin and steel. Richards actually cast his own body in plastic resin to create this sculpture and others. Tar Baby vs. St. Sebastian is currently located at the North Carolina Museum of Art in Raleigh, North Carolina, and was initially presented in the show Passages: Contemporary Art in Transition by Deidre Scott. It was this work that led to Richards being considered the "most prolific artist to come through The Studio Museum A-I-R program" by Franklin Sirmans.

The Corcoran Gallery of Art presented a solo show by Richards in 2000.

Other notable pieces by Richards include Air Fall 1 (His Eye Is on the Sparrow, and I Know He’s Watching Me), Icarus Wings'n'Things, Escape Plan 100, Escape Plan 76 (Brer Plane in the Briar Patch) (1996), A Loss of Faith Brings Vertigo (1994), Climbing Jacob's Ladder (He Lost His Head) (1994), Great Black Airmen (Tuskegee) 1996, and [Untitled] (Free F'All) (1997).

Some pieces are lost, surviving only in photographs. Every Nigga Is a Star, a "silver statue of a Tuskegee pilot riding a flaming meteor", was in Richards's studio on September 11.

In 2021, the Museum of Contemporary Art North Miami exhibited a career retrospective called "Michael Richards: Are You Down?" to run through the 20th anniversary of the September 11 attacks. "Are You Down?" later was exhibited at the Bronx Museum of the Arts.

== Death ==
Richards was killed on September 11, 2001 while in his art studio on the 92nd floor of the World Trade Center's North Tower. Richards had decided to spend the night in his studio instead of making the two-hour trip back home to Queens. When American Airlines Flight 11 crashed into the tower between floors 93 and 99 at 8:46 A.M., the elevators were inoperable and debris from the impact zone landed onto the 92nd floor to seal up each of the three stairwells, making it impossible for anyone to escape on that floor. As a result, no one on Floor 92 and higher in the North Tower was able to survive. Richards either died from smoke inhalation, the intense heat, or he eventually perished when the North Tower collapsed at 10:28 A.M. His remains have never been recovered. The Michael Richards Fund was created to support artists of Caribbean descent. At the National September 11 Memorial, Richards is memorialized at the North Pool, on Panel N-63.
