= Eau Claire Formation =

American geologic formation

- Stratigraphic range: Cambrian
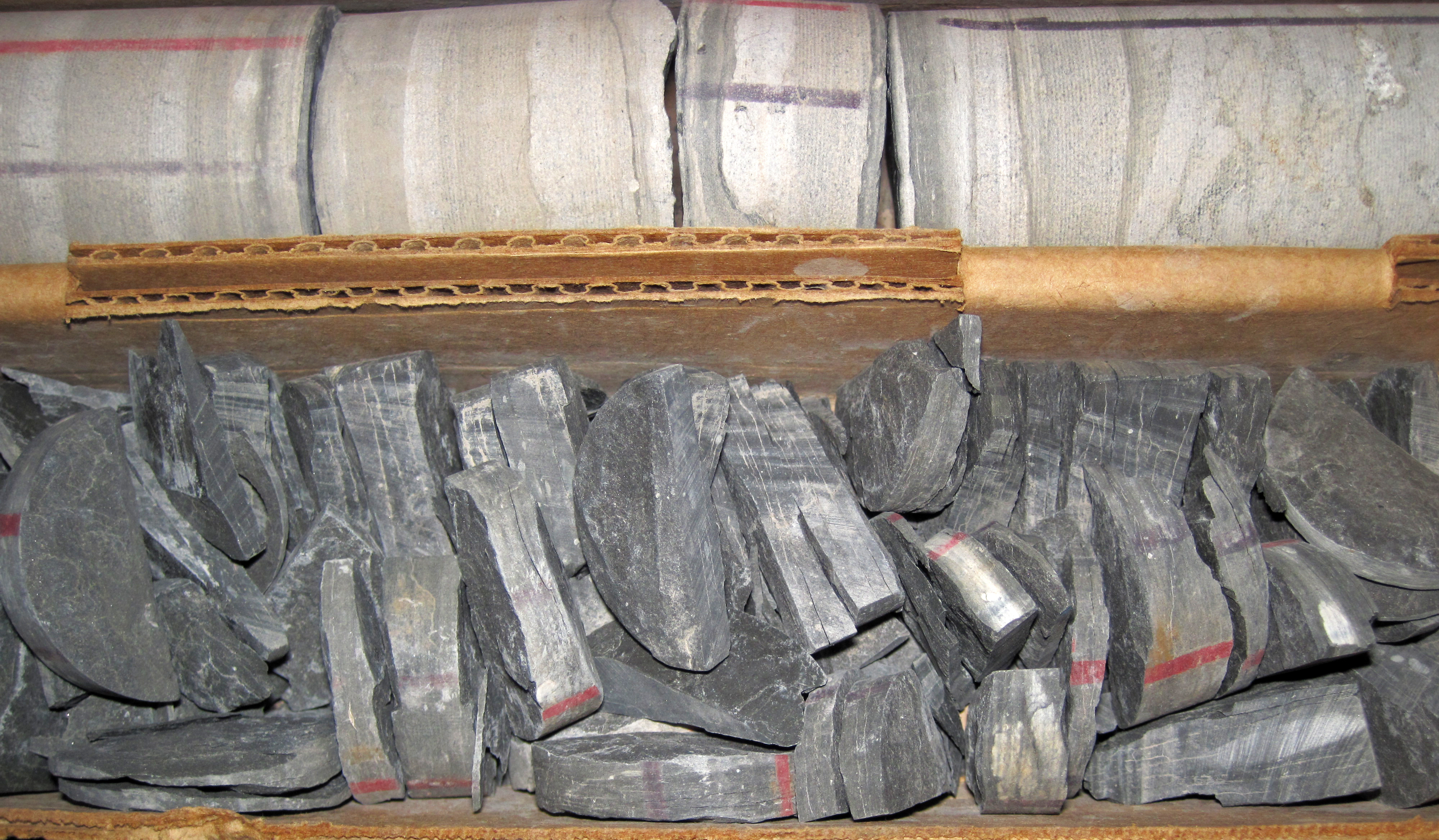
- Eau Claire Formation (Middle to Upper Cambrian; Warren County core, Ohio)
- Type: Formation
- Unit of: Munising Group
- Underlies: Davis Formation, Galesville Sandstone, Kerbel Formation, Knox Dolomite, and Potosi Dolomite
- Overlies: Mount Simon Sandstone
- Thickness: 400 to 1000 feet in Indiana

Lithology
- Primary: Sandstone
- Other: Siltstone, shale, dolomite

Location
- Region: Indiana, Illinois, Wisconsin, Michigan, Minnesota, western Ohio, and western Kentucky. Equivalent to the Bonneterre Formation in Missouri
- Country: United States

Type section
- Named for: Outcrops along the Eau Claire River, Eau Claire County, Wisconsin
- Named by: E. O. Ulrich

The Eau Claire Formation is a geologic formation in the north central United States. It preserves trilobite fossils from the Cambrian Period.

== See also ==
- List of fossiliferous stratigraphic units in Indiana

== Sources ==
- Aswasereelert, Wasinee; Simo, J.A. (Toni); LePain, David L. (2008). "Deposition of the Cambrian Eau Claire Formation, Wisconsin: hydrostratigraphic implications of fine-grained cratonic sandstones" (PDF). Wisconsin Geological and Natural History Survey. 19 (1).
- Various Contributors to the Paleobiology Database. "Fossilworks: Gateway to the Paleobiology Database". Archived from the original on 25 March 2022.
