= Munising Group =

Geologic formation in Michigan and Ontario

- Stratigraphic range: Cambrian-Early Ordovician
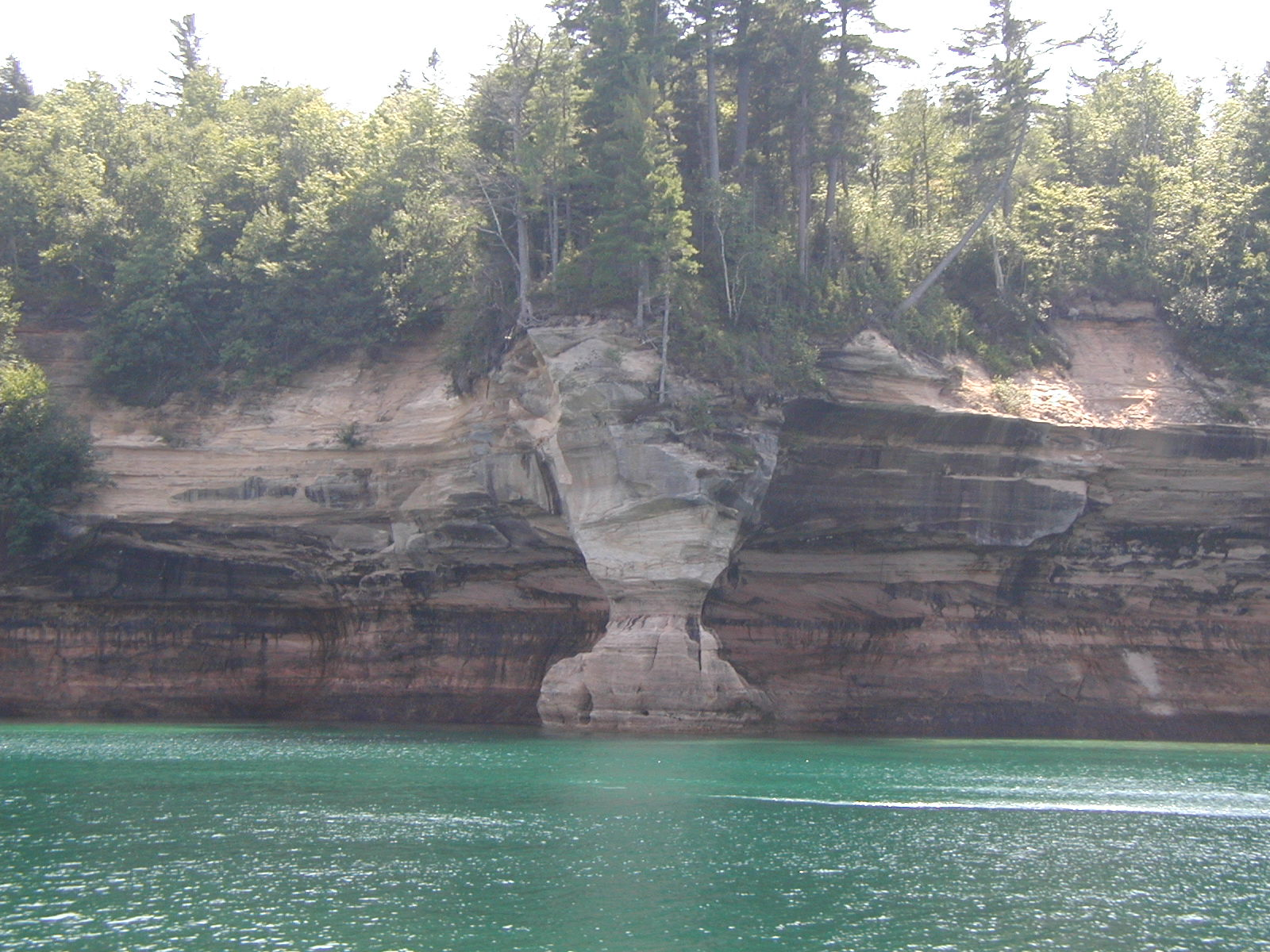
- Light-colored Musining Formation overlying the red Jacobsville Formation in Pictured Rocks National Lakeshore
- Type: Formation
- Sub-units: Davis Formation; Franconia Formation; Ironton Sandstone; Galesville Sandstone; Eau Claire Formation; Michigan: Miner's Castle Member; Chapel Rock Member; Basal Conglomerate
- Underlies: Au Train Formation
- Overlies: Jacobsville Sandstone
- Thickness: 1,700 ft (520 m)

Lithology
- Primary: Conglomerate
- Other: Anhydrite

Location
- Region: Michigan, Ohio, Ontario
- Country: United States, Canada

The Munising Group or Formation is a 1,700 feet (520 m) thick, white to light grey Cambrian sedimentary unit that crops out in Michigan and (to a lesser extent) Ontario. At one end of its extent, it comprises a basal conglomerate overlain by the Chapel Rock Member and the Miners Castle Member; elsewhere, it comprises the Eau Claire, Galesville (=Dresbach), and Franconia Members. Anhydritic evaporite deposits are present in places. The conglomerate was deposited by rivers in flood, with the Chapel Rock member, which contains deltaic deposits, representing transgression as the conglomerate cones became submerged; the Miners Castle member was deposited further from the shoreline, representing shelf deposits. Its uppermost strata may be Early Ordovician in age, and contain conodonts, trilobites and phosphatic moulds of brachiopods, ostrocoderm fish and gastropods.

The Munising lies unconformably above the Jacobsville Formation.

== Stratigraphy ==
=== Davis Formation ===
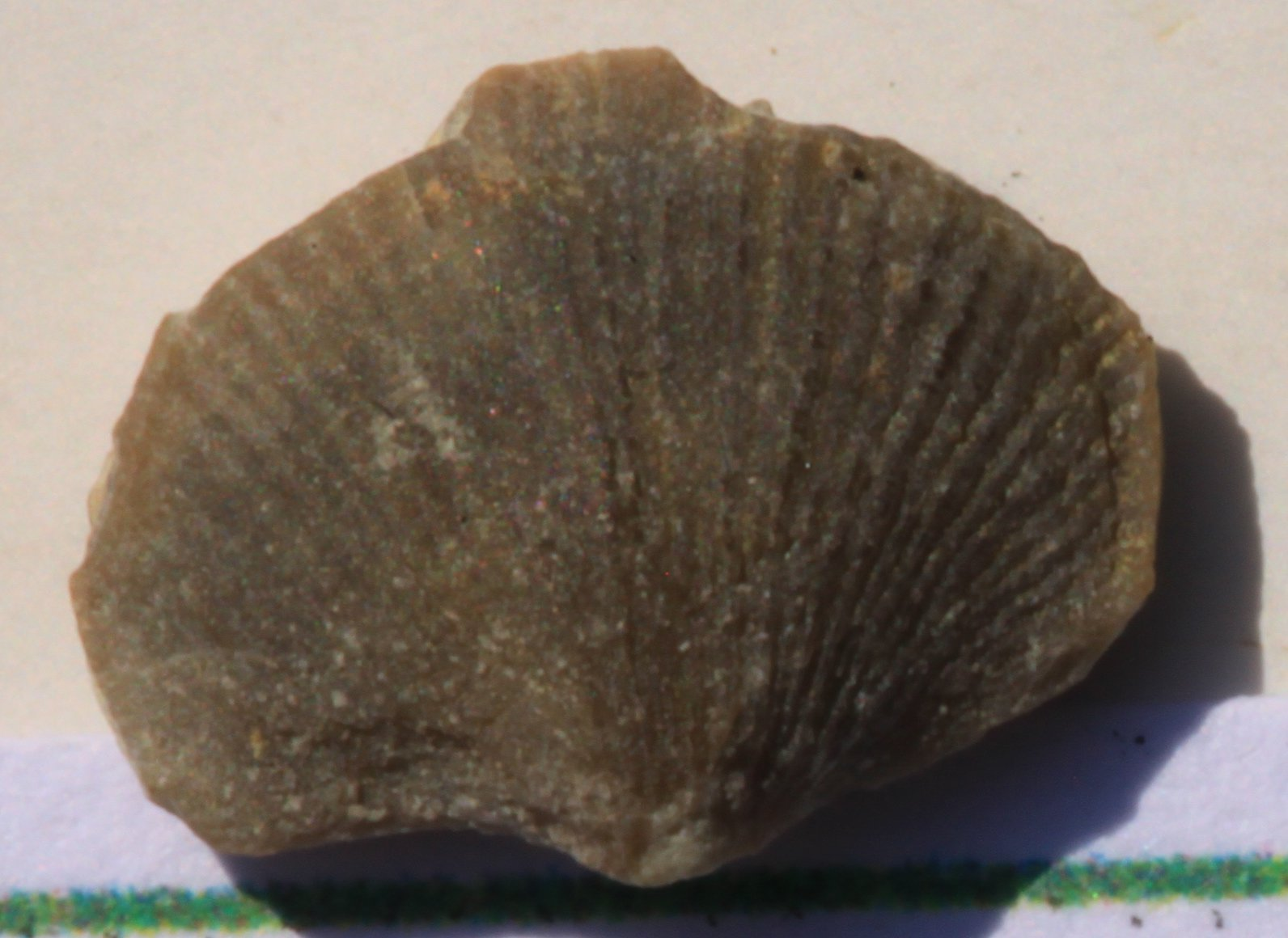
The lampshell Ocnerorthis monticola, Order Rhynchonellida, Family Eoortidae, from Davis Formation. Elwins, MO Upper Cambrian in age

The Davis Formation or Davis Member is found from Missouri through Illinois and into Indiana and Michigan. This formation is Upper Cambrian in age. It is named for Davis Creek located in St. Francois County, Missouri by Buehler (1907, p. 231). The formation is composed of Siltstone, Shale, Limestone and Dolomite. The rock of the Davis Formation is a gradual change between the lower Galesville, Ironton and Franconia Formations to the upper Potosi Dolomite.

Stratigraphically it is equivalent to the Franconia Formation in Illinois and Missouri. In Illinois it is the lower member of the Franconia. It is a named member of the Franconia in Illinois.

=== Franconia Formation ===
The Franconia Formation is a geologic formation in the upper mid-western United States, with outcroppings found in Illinois, Indiana, Iowa, Michigan, Minnesota, Missouri, Ohio, and Wisconsin. It was named the Franconia Formation due to the first published documentation of exposures in vicinity of Franconia, Minnesota in the 1897 Ph.D. dissertation by Charles P. Berkley at the University of Minnesota titled Geology of the St. Croix Dalles. The Franconian stratigraphic stage was named after this formation.

The formation consists of fine-grained glauconitic and dolomitic sandstone with interbedded shaly zones, becoming more dolomitic towards the east and south of its extent.

The Franconia has several named members; Birkmose Member (MO), Davis Member (IL), Derby-Doe Run Member (IL), Ironton Member (IL, WI, MI), Mazomanie Member (WI), Reno Member (MO, MN, WI), Tomah Member (MO)

=== Ironton Sandstone ===
The Ironton Sandstone is located in Indiana, Illinois and Wisconsin. It is stratigraphically equivalent to the Davis Formation to the east and south of an arbitrary cutoff line in northwestern Indiana. In Ohio its equivalent is the Kerbel Formation. The term Ironton Member was first coined by Thwaites, 192:3, p. 550, for exposures of a coarse grained sandstone at the base of the Franconia formation in Ironton, Wisconsin. The Ironton is a medium to coarse grained sandstone with layers of dolomitic sandstone interbedded within the formation.

=== Galesville Sandstone ===
The Galesville Sandstone is a geologic unit found in Northwestern Indiana and Wisconsin. Moving south and west it grades into the Davis Formation. In southern and western Indiana it is a named member of the Davis Formation this continues into Illinois. Named for exposures along Beaver Creek in Galesville, Wisconsin. The formation is fine to coarse grained sandstone. Grading upward towards the Ironton Sandstone. The Galesville ranges from about 50' to 100' thick.

=== Eau Claire Formation ===
The Eau Claire Formation originally called the Eau Claire Grit or Eau Claire Trilobite Bed (Wooster, 1878). The Eau Claire is found Indiana, Illinois, Wisconsin, Michigan, western Ohio, and western Kentucky. It is also called the Bonneterre Dolomite or Bonneterre Formation in Missouri. The Eau Claire is made up of dolomite, limestone, siltstone and shale. It can be over 1,000' thick in southwest Indiana. The Eau Claire comfortably overlies the Mount Simon Sandstone everywhere. In northwest Indiana the Eau Claire grades into the Galesville Sandstone. The Eau Claire contains trilobite fossils that date back to the Early to Mid Dresbachian Age (501-497 Ma).
