= John Hock =

John Hock may refer to:

- John Hock (American football)
- John Hock (sculptor)
