= Franconia Township =

Franconia Township may refer to the following townships in the United States:

- Franconia Township, Minnesota, in Chisago County
- Franconia Township, Pennsylvania, in Montgomery County
