= John Hock (sculptor) =

American sculptor, educator, curator, and arts administrator

- Known for: Sculpture

John Hock is an artist, arts administrator, artist advocate, and champion of the arts. He is the founder and Director of NE Sculpture Gallery Factory and the Social Justice BillBoard Project, both in Minneapolis, Minnesota.

He was born and grew up in Washington, D.C. In addition, Hock is the chief curator and manager for the City of St. Paul's Western Sculpture Park for Public Art Saint Paul.

Hock is the founding director and former Artistic Director of Franconia Sculpture Park in Franconia, Minnesota. He also co-founded the City of Poughkeepsie Sculpture Park in New York.
