= Knox Dolomite =

Cambrian era geologic formation in Ohio, United States

- Stratigraphic range: Cambrian
- Type: Formation
- Underlies: Stones River Group and Wells Creek Formation
- Overlies: Copper Ridge Dolomite, Eau Claire Formation, and Kerbal Formation

Location
- Country: United States
- Extent: Mississippi and Ohio

The Knox Dolomite is a geologic formation in Mississippi and Ohio. It dates back to the Cambrian.
