= Derby-Doerun Dolomite =

Cambrian geologic formation in the U.S. state of Missouri

Coordinates: 37.822551°N 90.5387361°W

- Stratigraphic range: Upper Cambrian
- Type: Formation
- Unit of: Elvins Group
- Underlies: Potosi Dolomite
- Overlies: Davis Formation

Lithology
- Primary: Dolomite

Location
- Region: St. Francois County, Missouri
- Country: United States

The Derby-Doerun Dolomite is a Cambrian geologic formation exposed in southeast Missouri. Originally the Derby and Doerun were originally considered separate formations, but now considered a single unit. The combined name is from the Derby Mine and the Doe Run Lead Company of the Old Lead Belt.

== See also ==
- List of fossiliferous stratigraphic units in Missouri
- Paleontology in Missouri
