= Middle Run Formation =

Geologic formation in Ohio, USA

- Stratigraphic range: Proterozoic
- Type: Formation
- Underlies: Mount Simon Sandstone
- Overlies: "East Granite-Rhyolite Province igneous and volcanic rocks"

Location
- Country: United States
- Extent: Indiana and Ohio

The Middle Run Formation is a geologic formation in Ohio. It dates back to the Precambrian. It was discovered in October 1987 when the United States Geological Survey dug a sample to learn more about Ohio's Precambrian basement rocks. Scientists estimated the boundary to be at 3,500 ft below the surface. After drilling through Mt. Simon sandstone, past the 3,500 ft mark, they were surprised to find more sandstone, which is the Middle Run Formation. Drilling in 1989 reached a depth of 5,370 ft of this same formation before the drill bit was stuck—without reaching the Precambrian basement rocks.
