= State Highway 243 (Minnesota–Wisconsin) =

Multiple State highways in the Northern United States

State Trunk Highway 243
- STH 243 highlighted in red

Route information
- Maintained by MnDOT and WisDOT
- Length: 1.53 mi (Note: Total mileage is a summation of the state mileages.) (2.46 km)
- Existed: 1949–present

Major junctions
- West end: MN 95 in Franconia Township, MN
- East end: WIS 35 in Osceola, WI

Location
- Country: United States
- States: Wisconsin, Minnesota
- Counties: MN Chisago; WI Polk

Highway system
- Wisconsin State Trunk Highway System; Interstate; US; State; Scenic; Rustic
- Minnesota Trunk Highway System; Interstate; US; State; Legislative; Scenic
← MN 241	MN	→ MN 244
← WIS 241	WI	→ WIS 253

Trunk Highway 243 and State Trunk Highway 243 (MN 243, WIS 243) are two short state highways in the U.S. states of Minnesota and Wisconsin. They connect MN 95 in Franconia Township, Minnesota with WIS 35 in Osceola, Wisconsin. The two highways meet at the state line on a bridge across St. Croix River. The combined highway is 1.53 miles (2.46 km) in length, 1.23 miles (1.98 km) in Minnesota and 0.30 miles (0.48 km) in Wisconsin. The two highways were designated in 1949. The bridge across the St. Croix River dates to 1953.

== Route description ==
Highway 243 serves as a short route between Franconia Township and the village of Osceola. The highway starts at MN 95 on Osceola Road and runs southeasterly for a short distance before it turns northeasterly and parallel to the St. Croix River. Then it turns back to the southeast near some ponds along the riverbank to the bridge across the river. The highway crosses the state line into Wisconsin continuing to the southeast. Before the highway ends, it turns to the east to intersect WIS 35 in Osceola.

== History ==
Trunk Highway 243 was authorized in 1949 in Minnesota, at the same time State Trunk Highway 243 was designated in Wisconsin. Dr. L.O. Simenstad was responsible for both highways being designated as part of their state highway systems. In 1952, the state of Minnesota reconstructed part of the roadway after a section of it washed out. This project lengthened the highway by 0.40 miles (0.64 km) at the time. The current bridge was built in 1953 and rebuilt in 1980 by the Wisconsin Department of Transportation (WisDOT). (Note: In the National Bridge Inventory, a collection of reports from state departments of transportation on the status of the country's bridges, Wisconsin and Minnesota both reported the 1953 construction, but only Wisconsin reported the 1980 reconstruction.) The bridge went through a month-long structural rehabilitation between late April and late May 2010. This project was being undertaken by Minnesota Department of Transportation (MnDOT) because the bridge is of similar design to the Interstate 35W Bridge over the Mississippi River that collapsed on August 1, 2007. At the same time as the closure, MnDOT repaved their stretch of Highway 243. WisDOT also repaved their segment of the roadway, and they removed some rock from a bluff near the highway overlooking the river. The project was completed on May 28, 2010, when the bridge reopened to cars and passenger trucks.

The bridge was closed in November 2026. MnDOT plans to replace the bridge with a new structure by the end of 2028 in coordination with WisDOT within the existing bridge's footprint.

== Major intersections ==
State	County	Location	mi (Note: Mileage numbers reset at the Minnesota–Wisconsin state line crossing.)	km	Destinations	Notes
Minnesota	Chisago	Franconia Township	0.000	0.000	MN 95 – Scandia, Taylors Falls	
St. Croix River			1.233 0.00	1.984 0.00	State line	
Wisconsin	Polk	Osceola	0.30	0.48	WIS 35 – Somerset, St. Croix Falls	
1.000 mi = 1.609 km; 1.000 km = 0.621 mi
