= Elvins Group =

Geologic group in Missouri, USA

- Stratigraphic range: Cambrian
- Type: Group
- Sub-units: Davis Formation and Derby-Doerun Dolomite
- Underlies: Potosi Dolomite
- Overlies: Bonneterre Formation

Lithology
- Primary: Dolomite
- Other: Shale

Location
- Region: Elvins, St. Francois County, Missouri
- Country: United States

The Elvins Group is a geologic group in Missouri. It preserves fossils dating back to the Cambrian period.

== See also ==
- List of fossiliferous stratigraphic units in Missouri
- Paleontology in Missouri
