= Franconian (stage) =

- 497 – 492.5 Ma

Usage information
- Celestial body: Earth
- Regional usage: Regional
- Time scale(s) used: North American

Definition
- Chronological unit: Age
- Stratigraphic unit: Stage

The Franconian is the middle stage of the Upper or Late Cambrian in North America, equivalent to the Chinese Changshanian with a span of nearly 4.5 million years, from about 497 to 492.5 Ma. The name comes from the Franconia Formation, about 100 feet (30 m) of sandstone and green shale exposed near the town of Franconia in eastern Minnesota, north of St Paul.

The Franconian is preceded by the Dresbachian and followed by the Trempealeauan, respectively the lower and upper stages of the North American Upper Cambrian or Croixan Series.
