= Franconia Formation =

Geologic formation in the upper mid-western United States

- Stratigraphic range: Cambrian
- Type: Formation
- Unit of: Munising Group (IN, MI, WI), Knox Group (IL), Tunnel City Group (IA, MN, WI)
- Sub-units: Birkmose Member (MO), Davis Member (IL), Derby-Doe Run Member (IL), Ironton Member (IL, WI, MI), Mazomanie Member (WI), Reno Member (MO, MN, WI), Tomah Member (MO)
- Underlies: Potosi Dolomite and St. Lawrence Formation
- Overlies: Ironton Sandstone

Location
- Region: Illinois, Indiana, Iowa, Michigan, Minnesota, Missouri, Ohio, and Wisconsin
- Country: United States

The Franconia Formation is a geologic formation in the upper mid-western United States, with outcroppings found in Illinois, Indiana, Iowa, Michigan, Minnesota, Missouri, Ohio, and Wisconsin. It preserves fossils dating back to the Cambrian period. It was named the Franconia Formation due to the first published documentation of exposures in vicinity of Franconia, Minnesota in the 1897 Ph.D. dissertation by Charles P. Berkley at the University of Minnesota titled Geology of the St. Croix Dalles. The Franconian stratigraphic stage was named after this formation.

The formation consists of fine-grained dolomitic sandstone with interbedded shaly zones, becoming more dolomitic towards the east and south of its extent.

== See also ==
- List of fossiliferous stratigraphic units in Wisconsin
- Paleontology in Wisconsin
