= Bonneterre Formation =

Upper Cambrian geologic formation

- Stratigraphic range: Guzhangian (Dresbachian); ~501–497 Ma
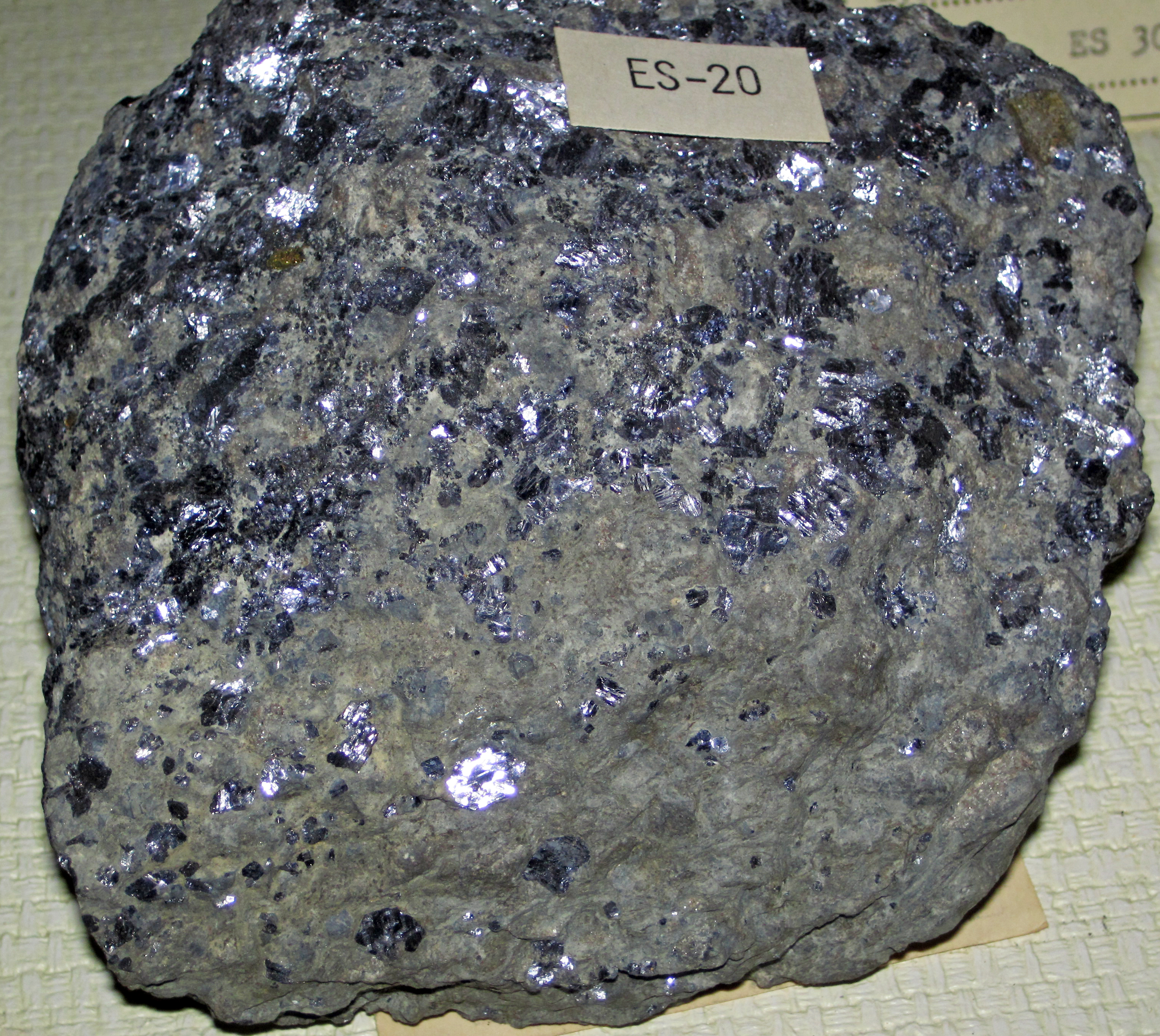
- Galena in Bonneterre Dolomite (Upper Cambrian; Missouri)
- Type: Formation
- Underlies: Davis Formation
- Overlies: Lamotte Sandstone

Lithology
- Primary: Dolomite
- Other: Shale, limestone, sandstone

Location
- Coordinates: 37.636°N 90.578°W
- Approximate paleocoordinates: 22.9°S 86.5°W
- Region: Arkansas, Kansas, Illinois, Iowa, Minnesota, Missouri
- Country: United States
- Bonneterre Formation (the United States) Bonneterre Formation (Missouri)

The Bonneterre Formation is an Upper Cambrian geologic formation which outcrops in the St. Francois Mountains of the Missouri Ozarks. The Bonneterre is a major host rock for the lead ores of the Missouri Lead Belt.

== Description ==
The formation is dominantly dolomite with areas or layers of pure limestone. A shaley or glauconitic zone occurs in the lower portion and the base contains sand and conglomerate or breccia where the formation overlaps the Lamotte and lies directly on the granite of the mountain core.

== Stratigraphy ==
Early geologists offered a variety of names for what is now known as the Bonneterre Formation. In 1894, Missouri state geologist Arthur Winslow proposed St. Francois limestone as a name for thick limestone beds, including everything between what are now known as the Lamotte Sandstone and the St. Peter Sandstone. He described the lower part of that formation (now comprising the Bonneterre and the Elvins Group) separately as the St. Joseph limestone. Charles Rollin Keyes's Fredericktown limestone included everything between the Lamotte and the Potosi Dolomite when he first described it in 1896, but his later uses of the name were in a more restricted sense equivalent to the modern Bonneterre.

In 1901, Frank Lewis Nason was the first to apply the name Bonneterre (originally spelled Bonne Terre) to these rocks, identifying a type section near the city of Bonne Terre, Missouri.

=== Contacts ===
The Bonneterre is conformably overlain by the Davis Formation. The Bonneterre Formation lies conformably on the Lamotte Sandstone and in places lies directly on the Proterozoic igneous core of the mountains.

=== Thickness ===
In the outcrop area the Bonneterre has an average thickness of 375 to 400 feet. It is present in the subsurface throughout Missouri and has a maximum recorded thickness of 1580 feet under Pemiscot County in the Missouri Bootheel.

== Fossils ==
The dolomites and limestones of the Bonneterre Formation contain fossils of late Cambrian invertebrates. Algal stromatolites, echinoderms, and microfossils such as Girvanella are associated with fringing reef paleoecosystems surrounding the Cambrian islands that are now the St. Francois Mountains. A variety of trilobite fossils have been reported from the Bonneterre, including Coosella, Holcacephalus, Meteoraspis, Tricrepicephalus, and Welleraspis. Several monoplacophorans have also been described from the Bonneterre; one, Hypseloconus bonneterrense is named for the formation.
