= Davis Formation =

Geologic formation in Indiana and Missouri, United States

- Stratigraphic range: Upper Cambrian
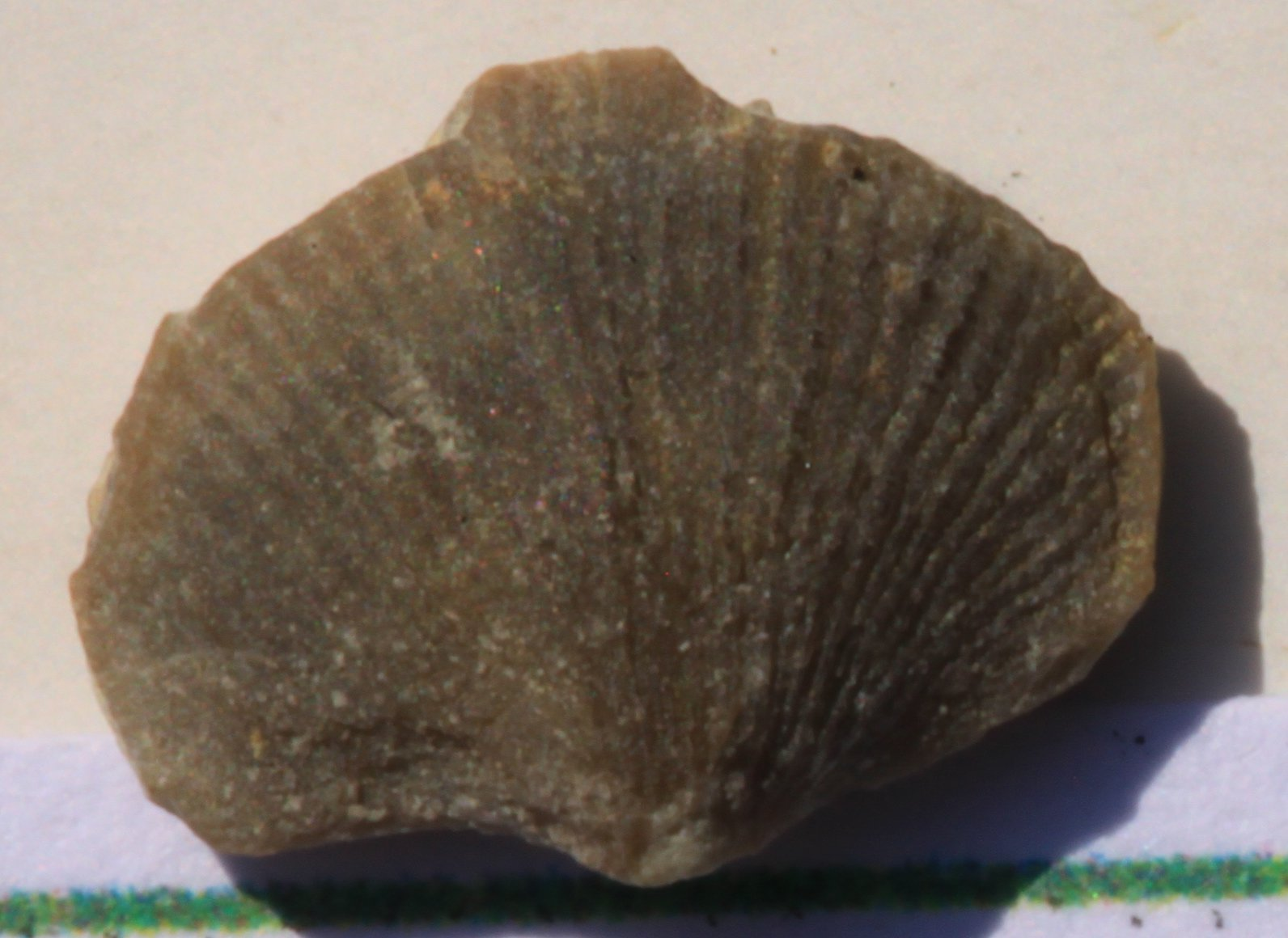
- Ocnerorthis monticola, fossil from the Davis Formation in Missouri
- Type: Formation
- Unit of: Elvins Group (in Missouri) and Munising Group (in Indiana)
- Underlies: Derby-Doerun Dolomite and Potosi Dolomite
- Overlies: Bonneterre Formation
- Thickness: 170 ft. average, 225 ft. maximum

Lithology
- Primary: Shale, Siltstone
- Other: Sandstone, dolomite, limestone conglomerate

Location
- Country: United States
- Extent: Illinois, Indiana, Minnesota, and Missouri

Type section
- Named for: Outcrops along Davis Creek, St. Francois County, Missouri

The Davis Formation is a geologic formation in Indiana and Missouri. It preserves fossils dating back to the Cambrian period.

== See also ==
- List of fossiliferous stratigraphic units in Indiana
- List of fossiliferous stratigraphic units in Missouri

== Sources ==
- Kleeschulte, Michael J.; Seeger, Cheryl M. (2003). "Davis Formation". Water-resources Investigations Report. US Geological Survey. pp. 11–15.
- Various Contributors to the Paleobiology Database. "Fossilworks: Gateway to the Paleobiology Database". Archived from the original on 25 March 2022.
