= Franconia Township, Minnesota =

Township in Minnesota, United States

Franconia Township
- Township
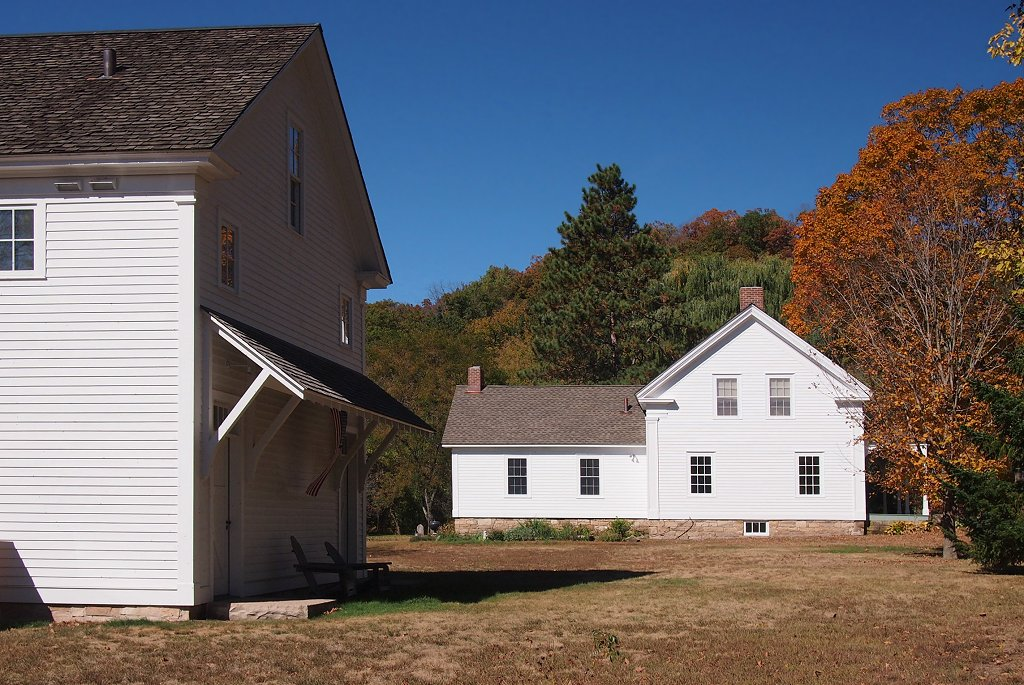

- Location within the state of Minnesota
- Coordinates: 45°21′18″N 92°45′2″W
- Country: United States
- State: Minnesota
- County: Chisago

Area
  - Total: 31.9 sq mi (82.6 km^{2})
  - Land: 30.2 sq mi (78.1 km^{2})
  - Water: 1.7 sq mi (4.5 km^{2})
- Elevation: 860 ft (262 m)

Population (2010)
  - Total: 1,805
  - Density: 60/sq mi (23.1/km^{2})
- Time zone: UTC-6 (Central (CST))
  - Summer (DST): UTC-5 (CDT)
- ZIP code: 55074
- Area code: 651
- FIPS code: 27-22310
- GNIS feature ID: 0664214
- Website: www.franconiamn.us

Franconia Township is a township in Chisago County, Minnesota, United States. The population was 1,805 at the 2010 census, up from 1,128 in 2000. The township is home to the Franconia Sculpture Park.

== History ==
Franconia Township was organized in 1858, and took its name from Franconia, Minnesota.

== Geography ==
Franconia Township is located in the southeast corner of Chisago County, on the west side of the St. Croix River, which forms the Wisconsin–Minnesota border. To the north are Shafer Township and the city of Shafer, to the north and west is Chisago Lake Township, and to the south in Washington County is the city of Scandia. The unincorporated community of Franconia is located in the northeast corner of the township.

U.S. Highway 8 follows the northern border of the township, leading east to Taylors Falls and west to Lindstrom. State Highway 95 (MN 95) runs south through the township, set back from the top of the bluffs overlooking the St. Croix River. State Highway 243 leads east from MN 95 across the river to the nearby village of Osceola, Wisconsin.

According to the United States Census Bureau, Franconia Township has a total area of 31.9 square miles (82.6 km^{2}), of which 30.2 square miles (78.1 km^{2}) is land and 1.7 square miles (4.5 km^{2}), or 5.50%, is water.

== Demographics ==
Historical population
Census	Pop.	Note	%±
1860	261		—
1870	650		149.0%
1880	944		45.2%
1890	816		−13.6%
1900	941		15.3%
1910	829		−11.9%
1920	775		−6.5%
1930	729		−5.9%
1940	659		−9.6%
1950	601		−8.8%
1960	621		3.3%
1970	650		4.7%
1980	1,007		54.9%
1990	1,151		14.3%
2000	1,128		−2.0%
2010	1,805		60.0%
U.S. Decennial Census

As of the census of 2000, there were 1,128 people, 316 households, and 257 families residing in the township. The population density was 36.9 inhabitants per square mile (14.2/km^{2}). There were 340 housing units at an average density of 11.1 per square mile (4.3/km^{2}). The racial makeup of the township was 96.90% White, 1.51% African American, 0.89% Native American, 0.35% Asian, and 0.35% from two or more races. Hispanic or Latino of any race were 1.15% of the population.

There were 316 households, out of which 45.9% had children under the age of 18 living with them, 73.1% were married couples living together, 2.2% had a female householder with no husband present, and 18.4% were non-families. 14.6% of all households were made up of individuals, and 2.8% had someone living alone who was 65 years of age or older. The average household size was 3.04 and the average family size was 3.37.

In the township the population was spread out, with 34.0% under the age of 18, 5.7% from 18 to 24, 28.7% from 25 to 44, 25.1% from 45 to 64, and 6.5% who were 65 years of age or older. The median age was 36 years. For every 100 females, there were 127.0 males. For every 100 females age 18 and over, there were 134.7 males.

The median income for a household in the township was $68,125, and the median income for a family was $70,521. Males had a median income of $48,333 versus $35,714 for females. The per capita income for the township was $25,233. None of the families and 0.9% of the population were living below the poverty line, including no under eighteens and 1.5% of those over 64.

== Popular culture ==
Franconia township is situated in a region commonly known as 'Swedeland, USA' for its locale as an area heavily settled by Swedish immigrants. Swedish author Vilhelm Moberg wrote a series of four novels regarding Swedish emigration to Minnesota titled The Emigrants, the last of which contains a reference to Franconia. In the final chapters of The Last Letter Home, the main character Karl Oskar watches his children grow into adulthood after the death of his wife Kristina. It is mentioned that the fifth of his six children, his daughter Ulrika, later married a Norwegian farmer and raised a family of four children in Franconia.
