= Mount Simon Sandstone =

Geologic formation in the United States

- Stratigraphic range: Upper Cambrian
- Type: Geological formation
- Unit of: Potsdam Sandstone
- Underlies: Eau Claire Formation and Rome Formation
- Overlies: Hinckley Sandstone and Middle Run Formation
- Thickness: up to 2,000 feet (610 m)

Lithology
- Primary: Coarse sandstones
- Other: Occasional fine dark grey or maroon shales

Location
- Extent: Illinois, Indiana, Kentucky, Michigan, Minnesota, Ohio, and Wisconsin,

Type section
- Named for: Mount Simon escarpment in Eau Claire County, Wisconsin
- Named by: E. O. Ulrich
- Thickness at type section: 235 feet

The Mount Simon Sandstone is an Upper Cambrian sandstone and is found in many states in the Midwest such as Wisconsin, Minnesota, Iowa, Illinois, and Missouri.

The Mount Simon formation is the equivalent of the La Motte Sandstone formation in the St. Francois Mountains of Missouri. It was deposited in a nearshore environment, unconformably overlying Precambrian basement, and underlying the Eau Claire Formation in Wisconsin.

The Mount Simon sandstone is named after an escarpment of sandstone in Eau Claire, Wisconsin, called Mount Simon by E.O. Ulrich.

== Geology ==
The Mount Simon sandstone is composed of three main lithofacies. First, the lower Mount Simon is composed of a medium to coarse gained sandstone, which is interpreted to have a diagenesis of a high-energy river system.

The middle Mount Simon is a fine to medium grained sandstone with shale beds in it, which is interpreted to be in a high-energy delta.

Finally, the upper Mount Simon is a sandstone that is interpreted to be deposited in a sand shoal or a tidal flat deposits. The upper Mount Simon also has fossil content such as brachiopod shells that are broken up.

There are also different lithofacies within the Mount Simon, which include siltstones, mudstones, and conglomerates. The mudstone and siltstone range from 8 cm to 1 m and is gray to green-gray; however, it is predominantly red. There are also some interbedded layers of small sand grains. The mudstone and siltstone layer is interpreted to be deposited in a distal braid plain (braided river).

The conglomerate layer consists of quartz pebble (1–2 cm with a maximum of 3–4 cm) conglomerates that are well to poorly sorted. The conglomerate layer is at the basal scour of the bed and is 2.5–13 cm thick. This layer is interpreted to be deposited in a medial braid plain and the conglomerate is a result of fluctuations in the energy of the river.

=== Accessory minerals ===
Minerals other than quartz grains are included in the Mount Simon. Zircon is the most abundant non-opaque mineral in the sandstone, ranging in length, with the average being .1–.2 mm. The color of the zircons was colorless to pink, and some were oxidized, leaving a reddish-orange to yellow color. The next most abundant mineral is tourmaline, which ranges between .15 and .3 mm. The vast majority of the grains are green to yellow-brown, and the minority are blue, pink, green, and violet colors. Rutile is the next most abundant mineral, ranging between .1 and .2 mm in size, and is a yellow-brown or red color. Garnet is the next most abundant and is colorless to pinkish-brown, and ranges in size between .1 and .3 mm. Apatite, amphibole, pyroxene, epidote, diaspore, staurolite, and anatase are all minerals that occur in the sandstone; however, they are not abundant and only take up a small percent of the grains in the rock.
