= Gasconade Formation =

Geologic formation in Missouri, United States

- Stratigraphic range: Ordovician
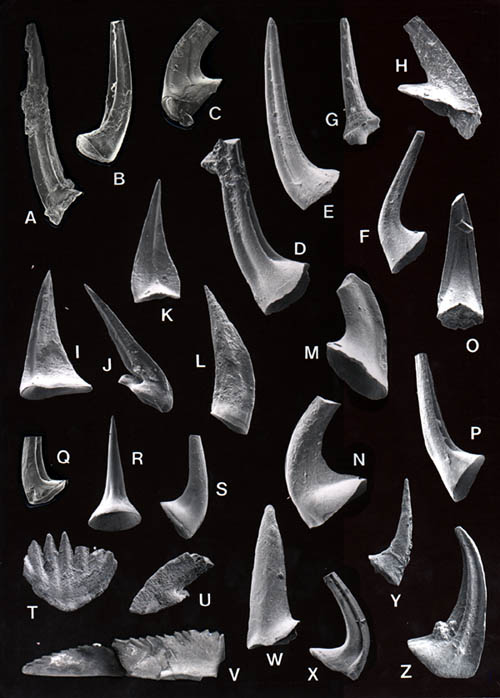
- Conodonts from the Gasconade Formation
- Type: Formation
- Sub-units: Basal Gunter Sandstone member
- Underlies: Roubidoux Formation
- Overlies: Eminence Formation Cambrian (unconformable)

Lithology
- Primary: Dolomite
- Other: Sandstone

Location
- Coordinates: 38.2°N 91.1°W
- Region: Missouri
- Country: United States

The Gasconade Formation is a geologic formation in the Ozarks of Missouri. It preserves fossils dating back to the Ordovician Period.

== Paleofauna ==
=== Monoplacophora ===
- Kirengella

K. expansus

- Titanoplina

T. meramecensis

== See also ==
- List of fossiliferous stratigraphic units in Missouri
- Paleontology in Missouri
