= Ironton Sandstone =

Geologic formation in Indiana, United States

- Stratigraphic range: Cambrian
- Type: Formation
- Unit of: Munising Group
- Underlies: Franconia Formation
- Overlies: Galesville Sandstone

Lithology
- Primary: Sandstone

Location
- Region: Indiana
- Country: United States

The Ironton Sandstone is a geologic formation in Indiana.

== Sources ==
- Emrich, G.H. (1966). Ironton and Galesville (Cambrian) Sandstones in Illinois and Adjacent Areas. Circular / Illinois State Geological Survey. Department of Registration and Education, State of Illinois. Illinois State Geological Survey.
