= Jefferson City Formation =

Geologic formation in Arkansas and Missouri, United States

Coordinates: 36°37′30″N 90°49′50″W

- Stratigraphic range: Early Ordovician
- Type: Formation
- Underlies: Cotter Dolomite
- Overlies: Roubidoux Formation

Lithology
- Primary: Dolomite
- Other: Chert, sandstone

Location
- Region: Arkansas, Missouri
- Country: United States

Type section
- Named for: Jefferson City, Cole County, Missouri
- Named by: Arthur Winslow

The Jefferson City Formation or Jefferson City Dolomite is a geologic formation in the Ozarks of Missouri and Arkansas. The Jefferson City is in part not differentiated from the Cotter Formation of northern Arkansas. It preserves fossils dating back to the Ordovician period.

== See also ==
- List of fossiliferous stratigraphic units in Missouri
- Paleontology in Missouri
