= Eminence Formation =

Geologic formation in Missouri, United States

- Stratigraphic range: Upper Cambrian
- Type: Formation
- Underlies: Gunter Sandstone Member of the Gasconade Formation
- Overlies: Potosi Formation

Lithology
- Primary: Dolomite
- Other: Chert

Location
- Coordinates: 37°9′2″N 91°21′27″W
- Region: Eminence, Shannon County, Missouri
- Country: United States

The Eminence Formation or Eminence Dolomite is a geologic formation in Missouri. It preserves fossils dating back to the Cambrian period.

== Paleofauna ==
=== Monoplacophora ===
- Biloboconus

B. frizzelli

- Potosiplina

P. delorensis

== See also ==
- List of fossiliferous stratigraphic units in Missouri
- Paleontology in Missouri
