= Roubidoux Formation =

Geologic formation in the Ozarks of Missouri

- Stratigraphic range: Ordovician
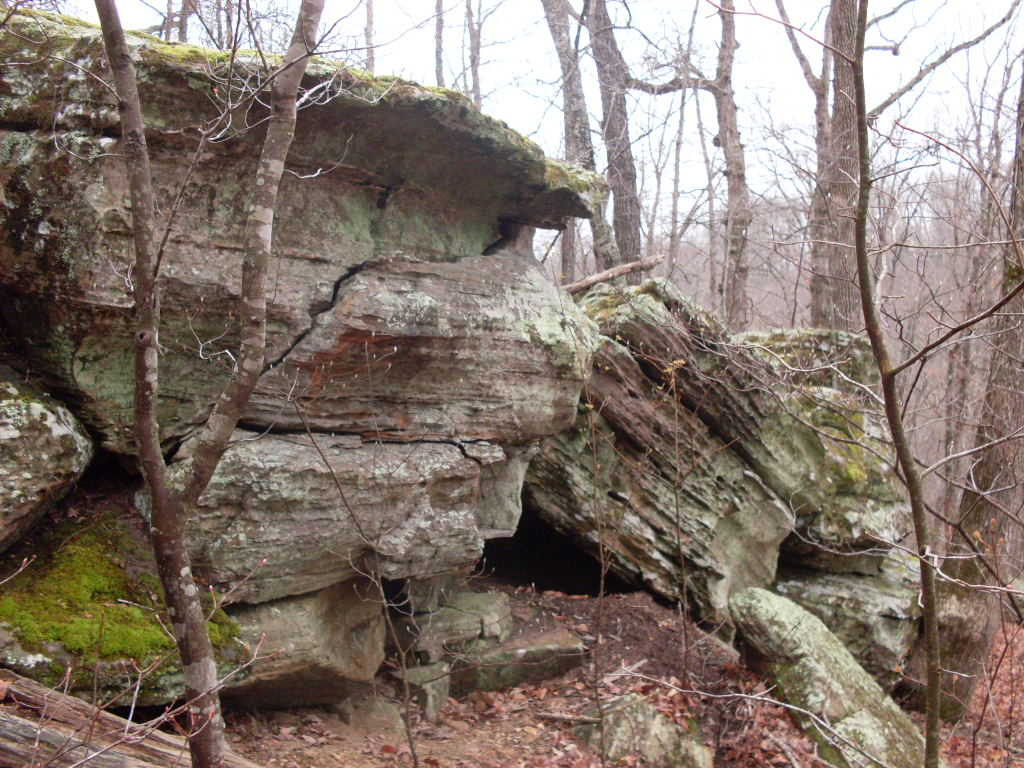
- Outcrop of Roubidoux sandstone in the Missouri Ozarks
- Type: Formation
- Underlies: Jefferson City Formation in the Missouri Ozarks
- Overlies: Gasconade Formation
- Thickness: 100 to 300 feet

Lithology
- Primary: Sandstone
- Other: dolomite, chert

Location
- Coordinates: 36.90°N 92.57°W
- Region: Missouri
- Country: United States

Type section
- Named for: Roubidoux Creek, Texas and Pulaski counties, Missouri

The Roubidoux Formation is a geologic formation in the Ozarks of Missouri. It preserves fossils dating back to the Ordovician period.

== Paleofauna ==
=== Monoplacophora ===
- Kirengella

K. oregonensis

- Wildernessia

W. inexpectans

=== Gastropoda ===
- Lecanospira

L. perplana

== See also ==
- List of fossiliferous stratigraphic units in Missouri
- Paleontology in Missouri
