= Cotter Formation =

Geologic formation in the United States

- Stratigraphic range: Ordovician
- Type: Formation
- Underlies: Powell Formation
- Overlies: Jefferson City Formation

Lithology
- Primary: Dolomite
- Other: Chert, sandstone, shale

Location
- Region: Arkansas, Missouri, Oklahoma, Virginia
- Country: United States

Type section
- Named for: Cotter, Baxter County, Arkansas
- Named by: Edward Oscar Ulrich

The Cotter Formation is a geologic formation in Arkansas, Missouri, Oklahoma and in Virginia. It preserves fossils dating back to the Ordovician period.

== See also ==
- List of fossiliferous stratigraphic units in Arkansas
- List of fossiliferous stratigraphic units in Virginia
- Paleontology in Arkansas
- Paleontology in Virginia
