= Franconia Sculpture Park =

Outdoor sculpture park in Franconia, Minnesota

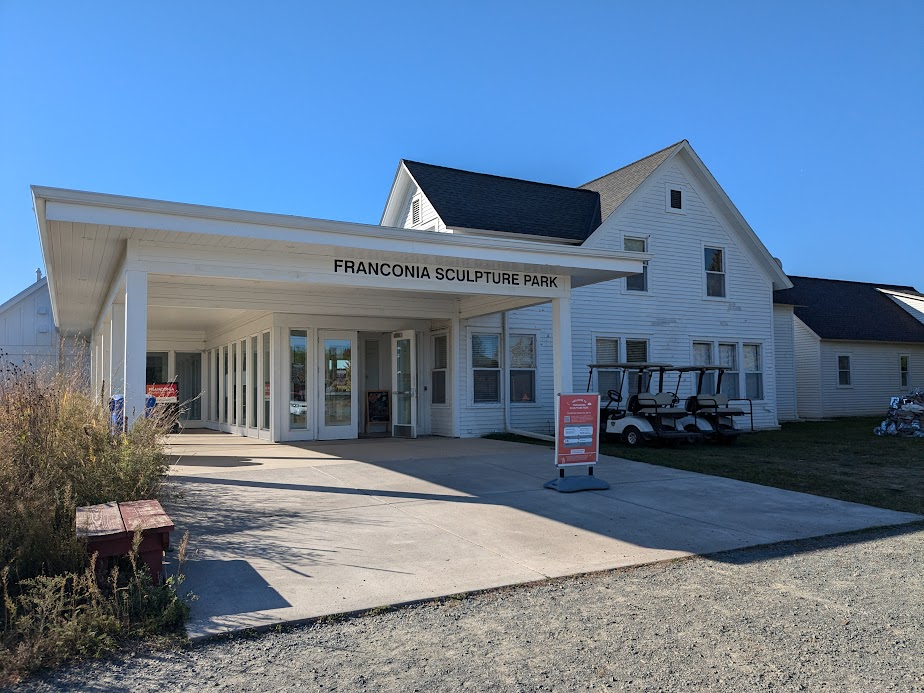
- Visitor Center

- Location of Franconia Sculpture Park in Minnesota
- Established: 1996
- Location: 29836 St. Croix Trail, Franconia, Minnesota, United States
- Coordinates: 45°22′53″N 92°42′20″W
- Type: Sculpture garden
- Visitors: 180,000 annually
- Parking: On site
- Website: www.franconia.org

Franconia Sculpture Park is an outdoor sculpture park in Franconia, Minnesota, United States, that offers a 50-acre outdoor museum, active artist residency program, and a depth and breadth of community arts programming for a diverse and engaged public. The 50-acre (20 ha) park, with a rotating collection of over 100 contemporary sculptures, and is free and open to the public from 8 am-8 pm daily. The park draws over 180,000 visitors annually.

On September 26, 2020, Franconia Sculpture Park opened Franconia Commons, a lively civic space that includes a visitor center, gift shop, restrooms, the Driscoll Education Center and the Mardag Gallery. Franconia Commons is open Apr. 15 – Nov. 14: Tuesday-Sunday, 9 am-5 pm; Nov. 15 – Apr. 14: Closed; and is closed on National Holidays.

Franconia Sculpture Park is located at the intersection of U.S. Route 8 and Minnesota State Highway 95 near Taylors Falls, in the St. Croix River Valley region of Minnesota.

== History ==
Franconia Sculpture Park was founded in 1996 by a small group of artists including Tasha Hock, John Hock, and Fuller Cowles. The original 16-acre (6.5 ha) park was 2 miles (3.2 km) east of the current location and in 2006 the park moved from its original location to the current 50-acre (20 ha) site. Since 1996, Franconia has established a reputation as one of the country's most innovative sculpture parks. From 2011 to 2018, Franconia established Franconia in the City, a 1,700-square-foot (160 m^{2}) gallery and education space at the Casket Arts Community Complex in Northeast Minneapolis. The park is governed by a board of directors that in 2021 includes Sara Rothholz Weiner, Heather Rutledge, Kevin Riach, Sharon Louden, Rosie Kellogg, Esther Callahan, Eric Bruce, Linda Seebauer Hansen, Stacy O'Reilly, Nora Kaitfors, Beth Theobald.

In 2009, Franconia was the only Minnesota arts organization outside of the Twin Cities to receive National Endowment for the Arts/American Recovery and Reinvestment Act funding. In 2010, the park was among the selected grantees to receive part of the $20 million allocation from the state of Minnesota's Arts and Cultural Heritage Fund. An 8,000 square foot Miyawaki forest was planted in 2016.

== Artist development ==
Franconia offers fellowship, internship, and workshop programs that support visual artists at all levels of their career as they create new sculpture to be sited specifically at the park. Artists are creating new work at the park from April through November. The program is publicized by actively soliciting artists' proposals locally, nationally, and internationally. Each year Franconia supports over 40 artists as they create and exhibit new work. Since their founding in 1996, Franconia has supported nearly 800 national and international visual artists.

== Arts learning ==
In 2013 Franconia launched the Rural Arts Program, with support provided by a Minnesota State Arts Board Arts Access grant, which in its first year served 1,213 rural youth, encouraging interaction and engagement with art and artists. In addition, Franconia has a schedule of exhibition tours, art-making workshops, and diverse cultural programming that serves over 14,000 arts learners each year.

== Special events ==
Each year Franconia hosts Music @ Franconia concerts, Film @ Franconia film series, Franconia 5 Minute Film Festival, Art & Farmers Markets (first Sunday of the month May - Oct), and the Art & Artists Celebration in September.

== Gallery ==
Selection of sculptures in the park
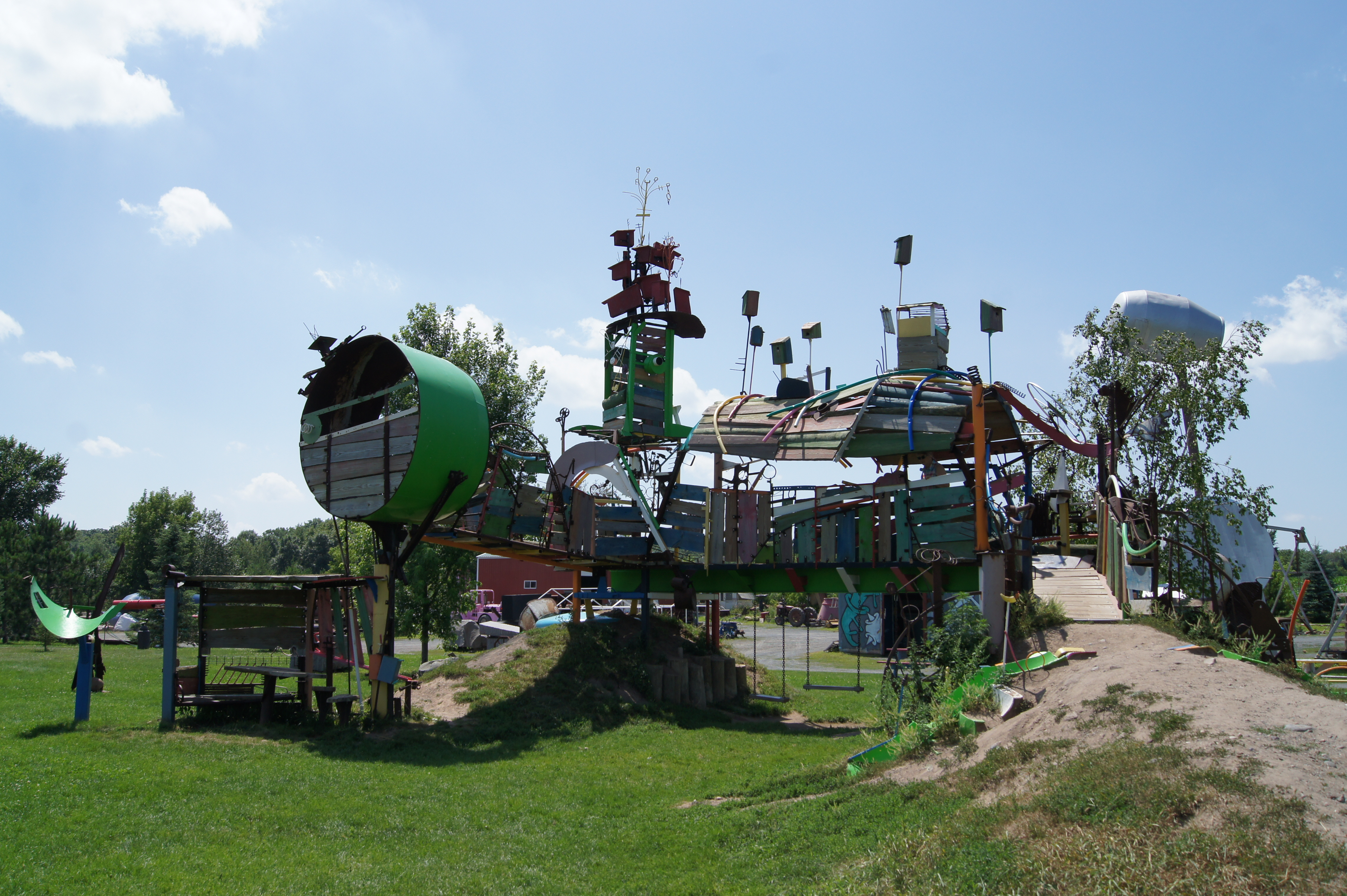

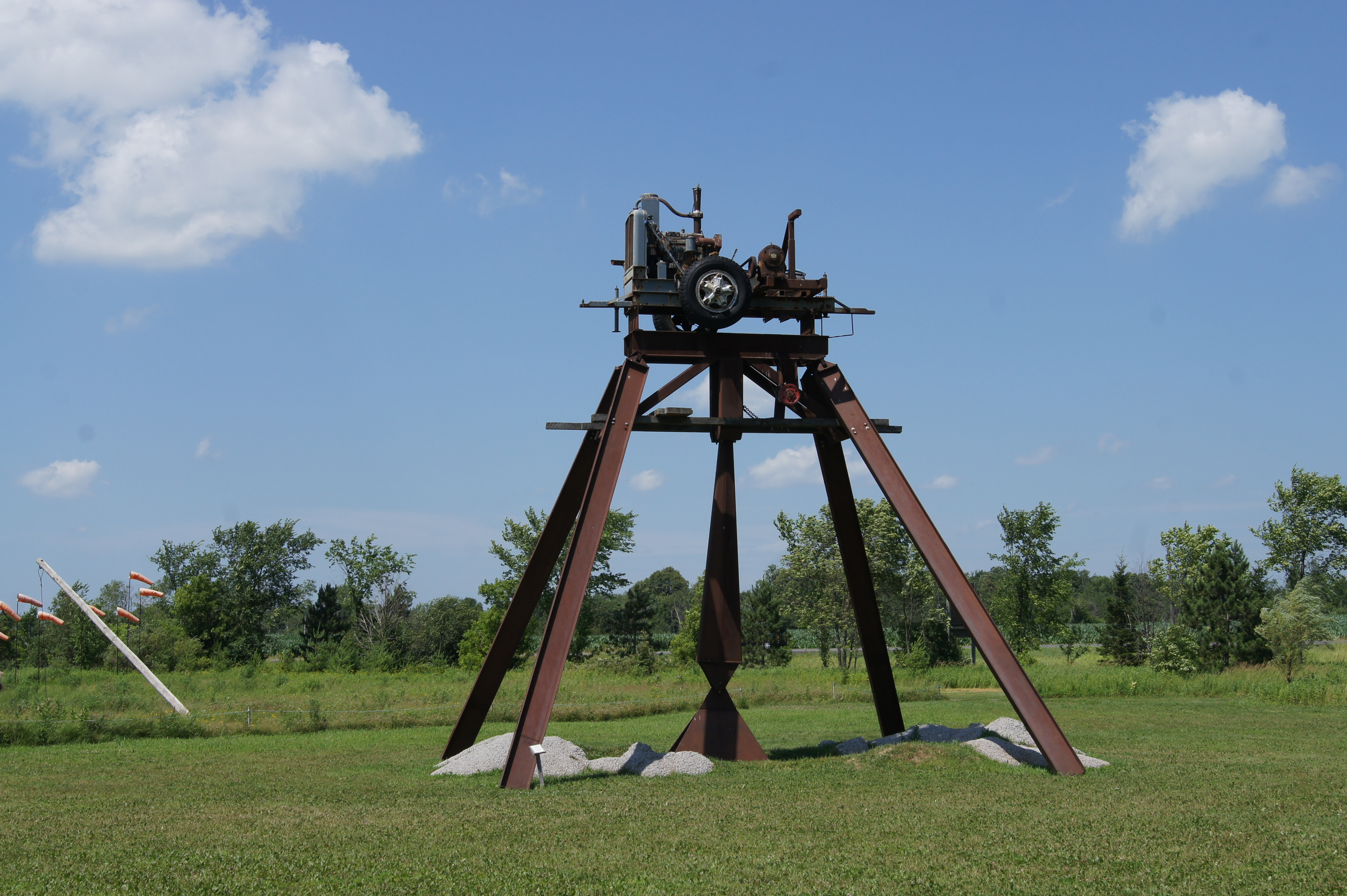

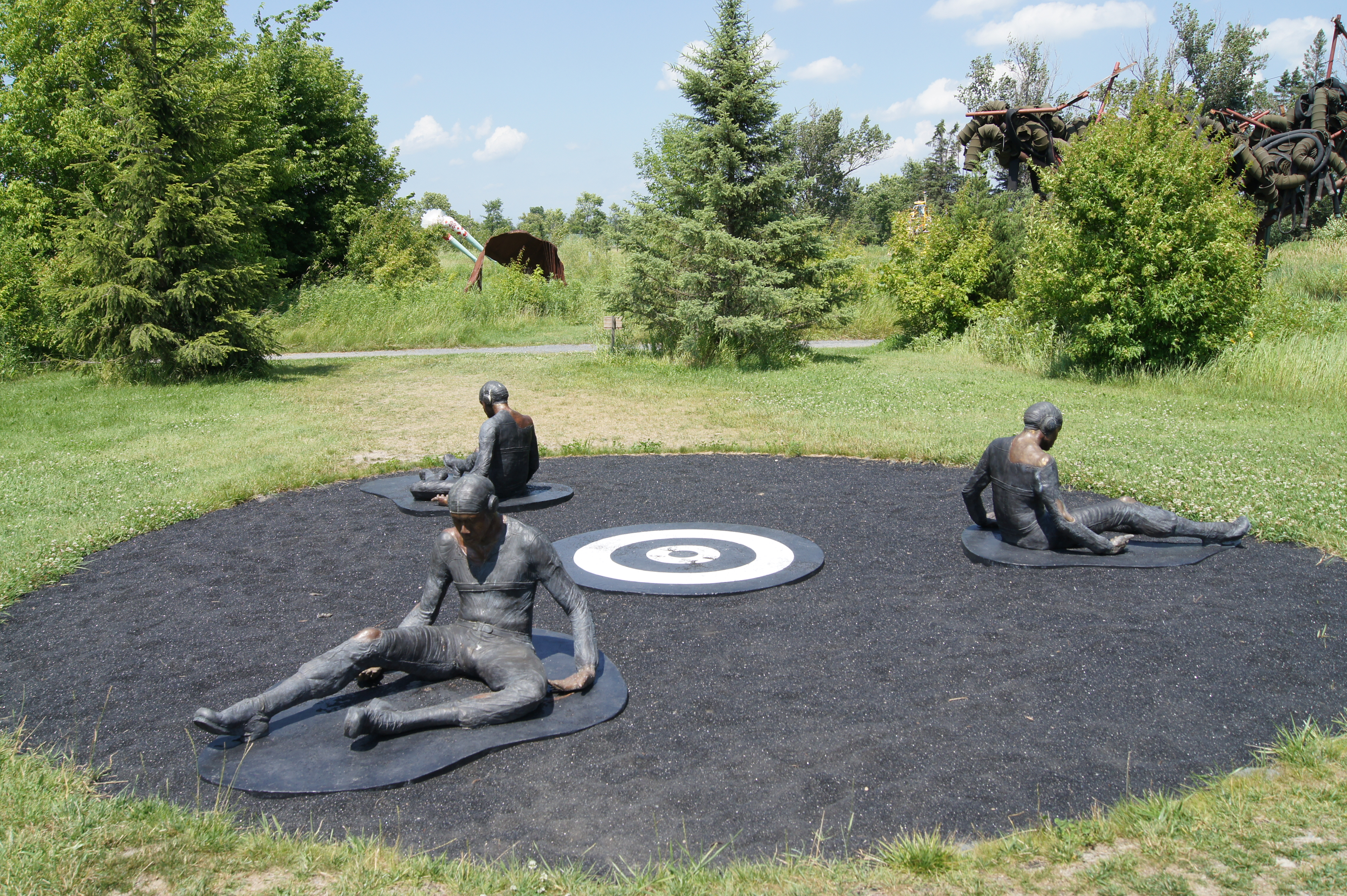

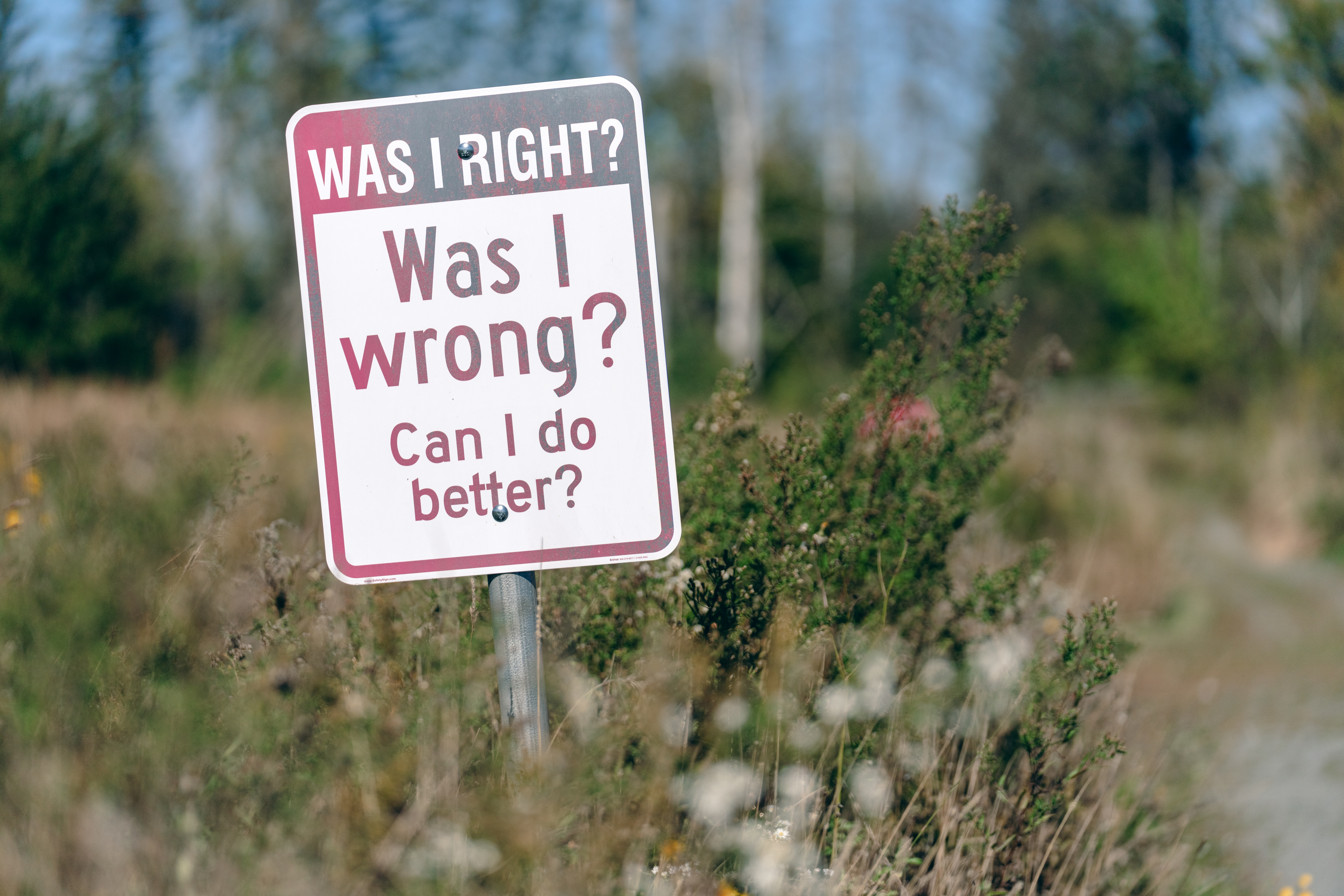

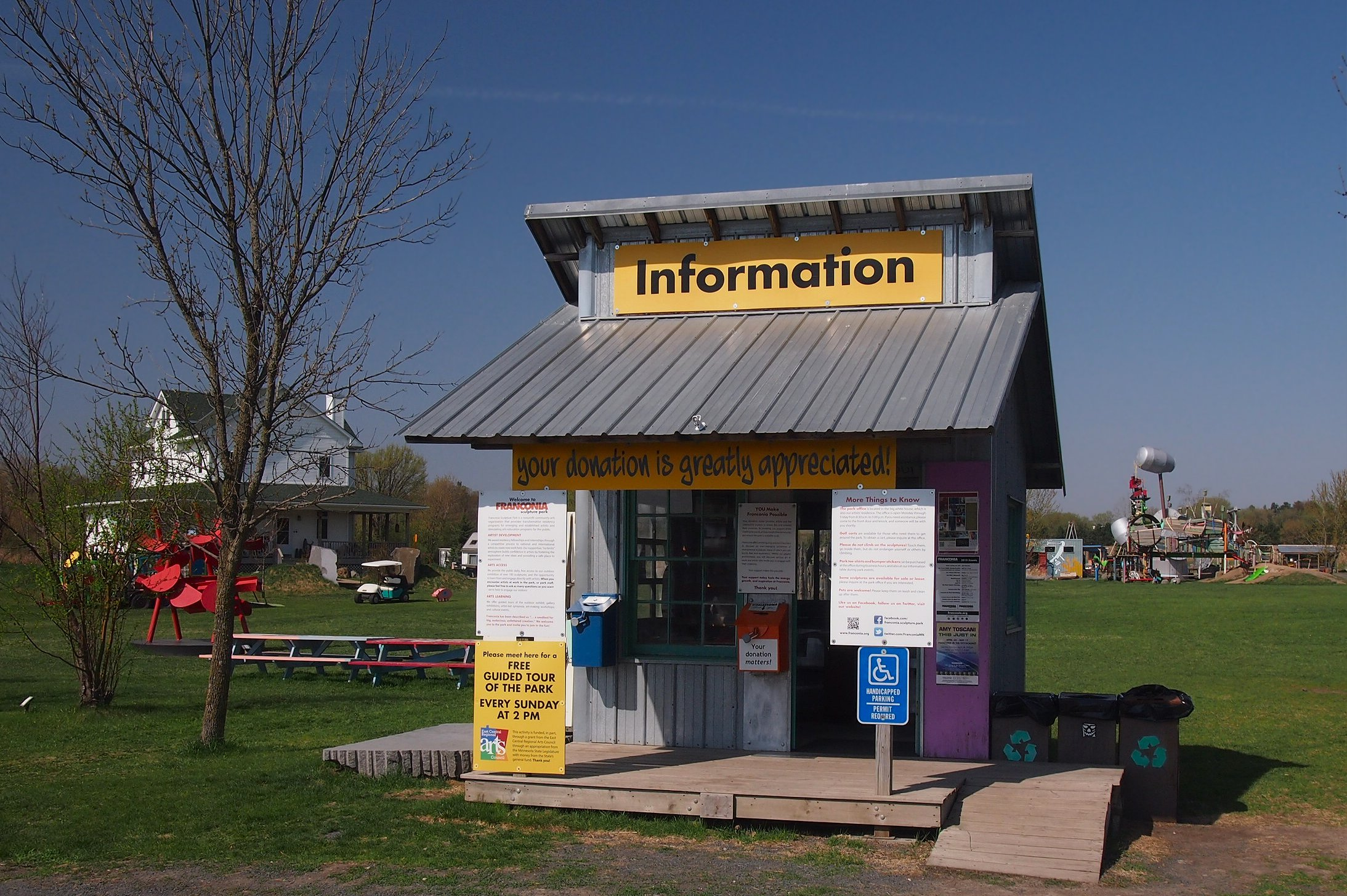

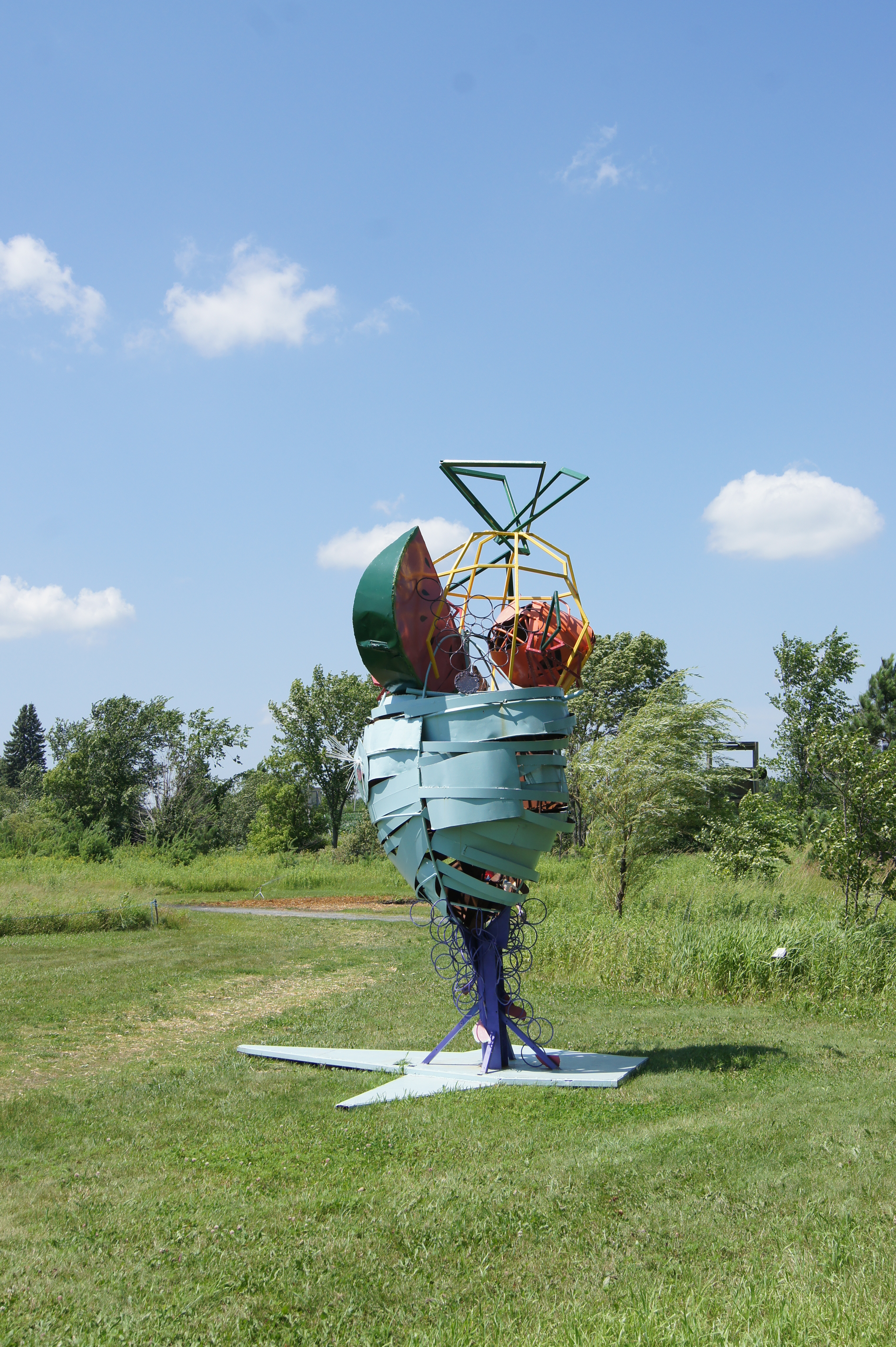
