= Franconia, Minnesota =

Unincorporated community in Minnesota, United States

Franconia
- Unincorporated community
- Location within Minnesota Location within the United States
- Coordinates: 45°22′13″N 92°41′30″W
- Country: United States
- State: Minnesota
- County: Chisago County
- Township: Franconia Township
- Elevation: 705 ft (215 m)
- Time zone: UTC-6 (Central (CST))
  - Summer (DST): UTC-5 (CDT)
- ZIP code: 55074
- Area code: 651
- GNIS feature ID: 643878

Franconia is an unincorporated community in Franconia Township, Chisago County, Minnesota, United States.

The community is located south of Taylors Falls near the junction of State Highway 95 (MN 95) and Franconia Trail. The St. Croix River is nearby.

Lawrence Creek flows through the community. Nearby places include Shafer, Taylors Falls, Lindstrom, and Scandia.

Franconia is home to the Franconia Sculpture Park at the intersection of Highways 8 and 95.

Osceola, Wisconsin is also nearby to the south-southeast.

Historical population
Census	Pop.	Note	%±
1880	150		—
1890	252		68.0%
U.S. Decennial Census

== History ==
Franconia was platted in 1858, and named after Franconia, New Hampshire, the native home of a first settler. A post office called Franconia was established in 1866, and remained in operation until it was discontinued in 1898.
