= Potosi Dolomite =

Geologic formation

Potosi Formation
- Stratigraphic range: Cambrian
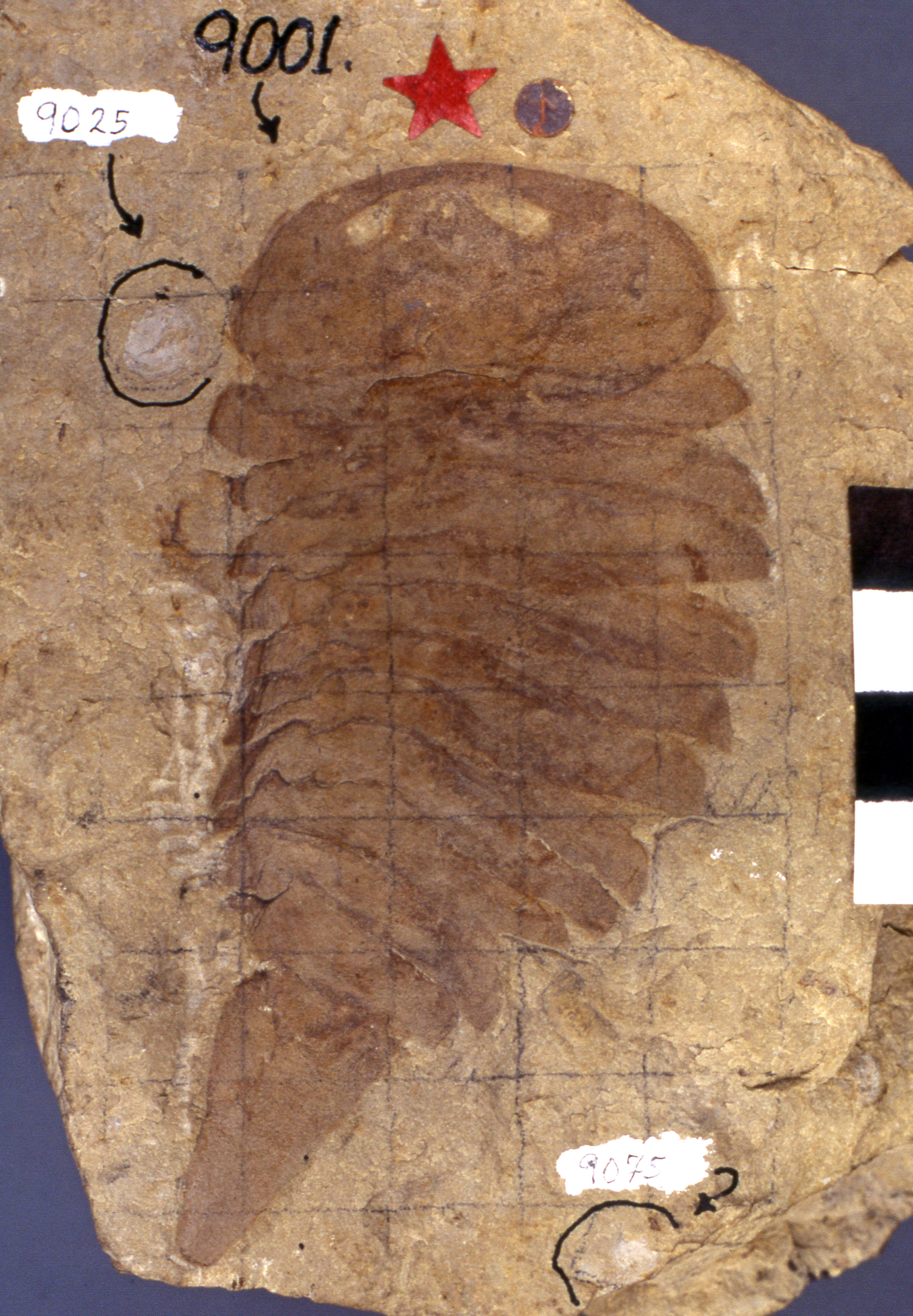
- Fossil from the Potosi Dolomite
- Type: Formation
- Underlies: Eminence Dolomite and Oneota Dolomite
- Overlies: Davis Formation, Derby-Doerun Dolomite, and Franconia Formation

Location
- Coordinates: 38.091733°N 90.685176°W
- Region: Illinois, Indiana, Missouri
- Country: United States

The Potosi Formation is a geologic formation in Missouri, Illinois and Indiana. It preserves fossils dating back to the Cambrian period.

== Paleofauna ==
=== Monoplacophora ===
- Gayneoconus

G. echolsi

== See also ==
- List of fossiliferous stratigraphic units in Missouri
- Paleontology in Missouri
