= List of fossiliferous stratigraphic units in Oklahoma =

This article contains a list of fossil-bearing stratigraphic units in the state of Oklahoma, U.S.

== Sites ==
Group or Formation	Period	Notes
Ada Group/Ada Formation	Carboniferous	
Altamont Formation	Carboniferous	
Arbuckle Group/Arbuckle Formation	Ordovician	
Arbuckle Group/Kindblade Formation	Ordovician	
Atoka Formation	Carboniferous	
Baldy Hill Formation	Triassic	
Barnsdall Formation	Carboniferous	
Blaine Formation	Permian	
Bloyd Formation	Carboniferous	
Boggy Formation	Carboniferous	
Bois d'Arc Formation	Devonian	
Boone Formation	Carboniferous	
Bostwick Formation	Carboniferous	
Bromide Formation	Ordovician	
Brownstown Formation	Cretaceous	
Caney Formation	Carboniferous	
Cape Formation	Ordovician	
Carey Formation	Carboniferous	
Chapman Ranch Formation	Ordovician	
Cherokee Shale	Carboniferous	
Cherryvale Formation	Carboniferous	
Chickasha Formation	Permian	
Clarita Formation	Silurian	
Coffeyville Formation	Carboniferous	
Cotter Formation	Ordovician	
Council Grove Group/Beattie Limestone	Permian	
Council Grove Group/Foraker Formation	Carboniferous	
Council Grove Group/Johnson Formation	Permian	
Council Grove Group/Red Eagle Formation	Permian	
Council Grove Group/Roca Formation	Permian	
Deer Creek Formation	Carboniferous	
Deese Formation	Carboniferous	
Deese Group/Boggy Formation	Carboniferous	
Dennis Formation	Carboniferous	
Dewey Formation	Carboniferous	
Dog Creek Formation	Permian	
Dornick Hills Group/Lake Murray Formation	Carboniferous	
Dornick Hills Group/Golf Course Formation	Carboniferous	
El Reno Group/Chickasha Formation	Permian	
El Reno Group/Duncan Formation	Permian	
El Reno Group/Flowerpot Formation	Permian	
Enid Formation	Permian	
Fayetteville Formation	Carboniferous	
Fayetteville Shale	Carboniferous	
Flowerpot Formation	Permian	
Fort Scott Limestone	Carboniferous	
Francis Formation	Carboniferous	
Garber Sandstone	Permian	
Gene Autry Formation/Gene Autry Shale	Carboniferous	
Golf Course Formation	Carboniferous	
Grenola Formation	Permian	
Haragan Formation	Devonian	
Hennessey Formation	Permian	
Henryetta Coal Formation	Carboniferous	
Henryhouse Formation	Silurian	
Hertha Formation	Carboniferous	
Hindsville Limestone	Carboniferous	
Hogshooter Formation	Carboniferous	
Holdenville Formation	Carboniferous	
Hunton Formation	Devonian	
Iola Formation	Carboniferous	
Jefferson City Formation	Ordovician	
Johns Valley Formation	Carboniferous	
Keel Formation	Ordovician	
Kindblade Formation	Ordovician	
Krebs Group/Krebs Formation	Carboniferous	
Krebs Group/Boggy Formation	Carboniferous	
Krebs Group/Hartshorne Formation	Carboniferous	
Lake Murray Formation	Carboniferous	
Lansing Group/Barnsdall Formation	Carboniferous	
Lansing Group/Stanton Formation	Carboniferous	
Lansing Group/Vilas Shale	Carboniferous	
Laverne Formation	Neogene	
Lecompton Formation	Carboniferous	
Leonard Series Group/Blaine Formation	Permian	
Leonard Series Group/Dog Creek Formation	Permian	
Lost Branch Formation	Carboniferous	
Marmaton Group/Fort Scott Formation	Carboniferous	
Marmaton Group/Oologah Formation	Carboniferous	
McCully Formation	Carboniferous	
Mesa Rica Sandstone	Cretaceous	
Moorefield Formation	Carboniferous	
Morrison Formation	Jurassic	
Morrow Formation	Carboniferous	
Morrow Group/Bloyd Formation	Carboniferous	
Nelagoney Formation	Wildhorse	
Nelly Bly Formation	Carboniferous	
Neva Formation	Permian	
Ochelata Group/Wann Formation	Carboniferous	
Ogallala Group/Ogallala Formation	Neogene	
Ogallala Group/Laverne Formation	Neogene	
Ohio Shale	Devonian	
Oil Creek Formation	Ordovician	
Omadi Formation	Cretaceous	
Oolagah Formation	Carboniferous	
Oread Formation	Carboniferous	
Ozan Formation	Cretaceous	
Paluxy Formation	Cretaceous	
Parajito Formation	Cretaceous	
Pawnee Formation	Carboniferous	
Pinetop Formation	Devonian	
Pitkin Formation	Carboniferous	
Red Eagle Formation	Permian	
Redoak Hollow Formation	Carboniferous	
Rexroad Formation	Neogene	
Sausbee Formation	Carboniferous	
Seminole Formation	Carboniferous	
Simpson Group/Simpson Formation	Ordovician	
Simpson Group/Joins Formation	Ordovician	
Simpson Group/McLish Formation	Ordovician	
Simpson Group/Oil Creek Formation	Ordovician	
Simpson Group/Tulip Creek Formation	Ordovician	
Skiatook Group/Nellie Bly Formation	Carboniferous	
Skiatook Group/Seminole Formation	Carboniferous	
Sloan Canyon Formation	Triassic	
St. Joe Formation	Carboniferous	
Summerville Formation	Jurassic	
Sumner Group/Garber Formation	Permian	
Sumner Group/Wellington Formation	Permian	
Trinity Group/Antlers Formation	Cretaceous	
Viola Formation	Ordovician	
Wabaunsee Group/Brownville Formation	United States	
Wabaunsee Group/Burlingame Formation	Carboniferous	
Wabaunsee Group/Foraker Formation	Carboniferous	
Wann Formation	Carboniferous	
Wapanucka Formation	Carboniferous	
Wapanucka Limestone	Carboniferous	
Welden Limestone	Carboniferous	
Wellington Formation	Permian	
Wetumka Formation	Carboniferous	
Wewoka Formation	Carboniferous	
Wewoka Shale	Carboniferous	
Whitehorse Formation	Permian	
Winfield Formation	Permian	

== See also ==
- Paleontology in Oklahoma
