= Krebs Group =

Oklahoma based fossil preservation group

- Stratigraphic range: Carboniferous
- Type: Group
- Sub-units: Boggy Formation (OK), Drywood Formation (OK), Hartshorne Formation (OK), McAlester Formation (OK), Rowe Formation (MO), Savanna Sandstone (OK), Seville Formation (MO), Warner Formation (MO)

Location
- Region: Oklahoma
- Country: United States

Type section
- Named for: Krebs, Oklahoma

The Krebs Group or Formation is a geologic group in Oklahoma. It preserves fossils dating back as far as the Carboniferous period. In Kansas and Missouri it is classified as a formation and is a member of the Cherokee Group.

== See also ==
- List of fossiliferous stratigraphic units in Oklahoma
- Paleontology in Oklahoma
