= Wellington Formation =

Geological formation

- Stratigraphic range: Early Permian(Artinskian); ~290–280 Ma
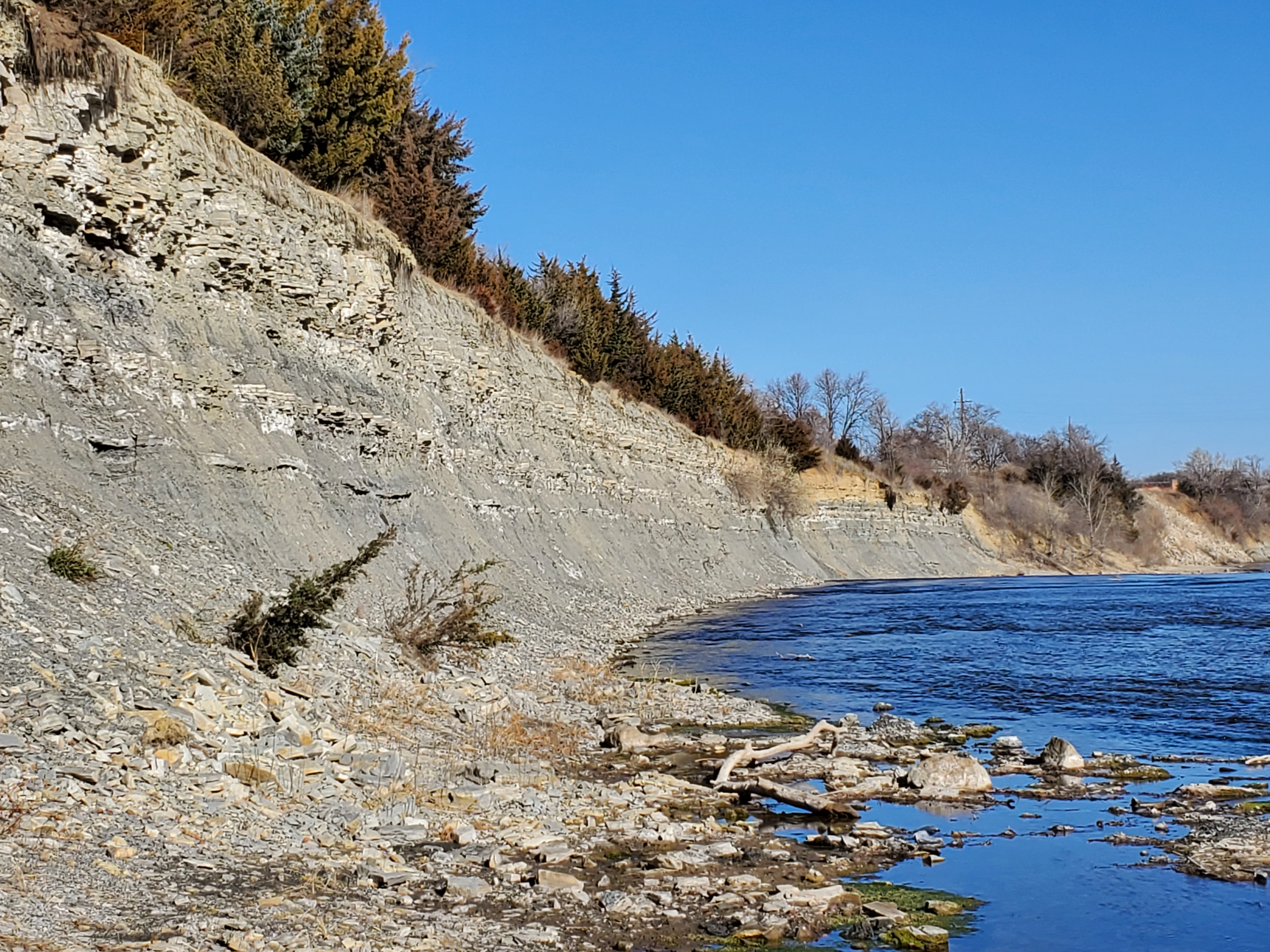
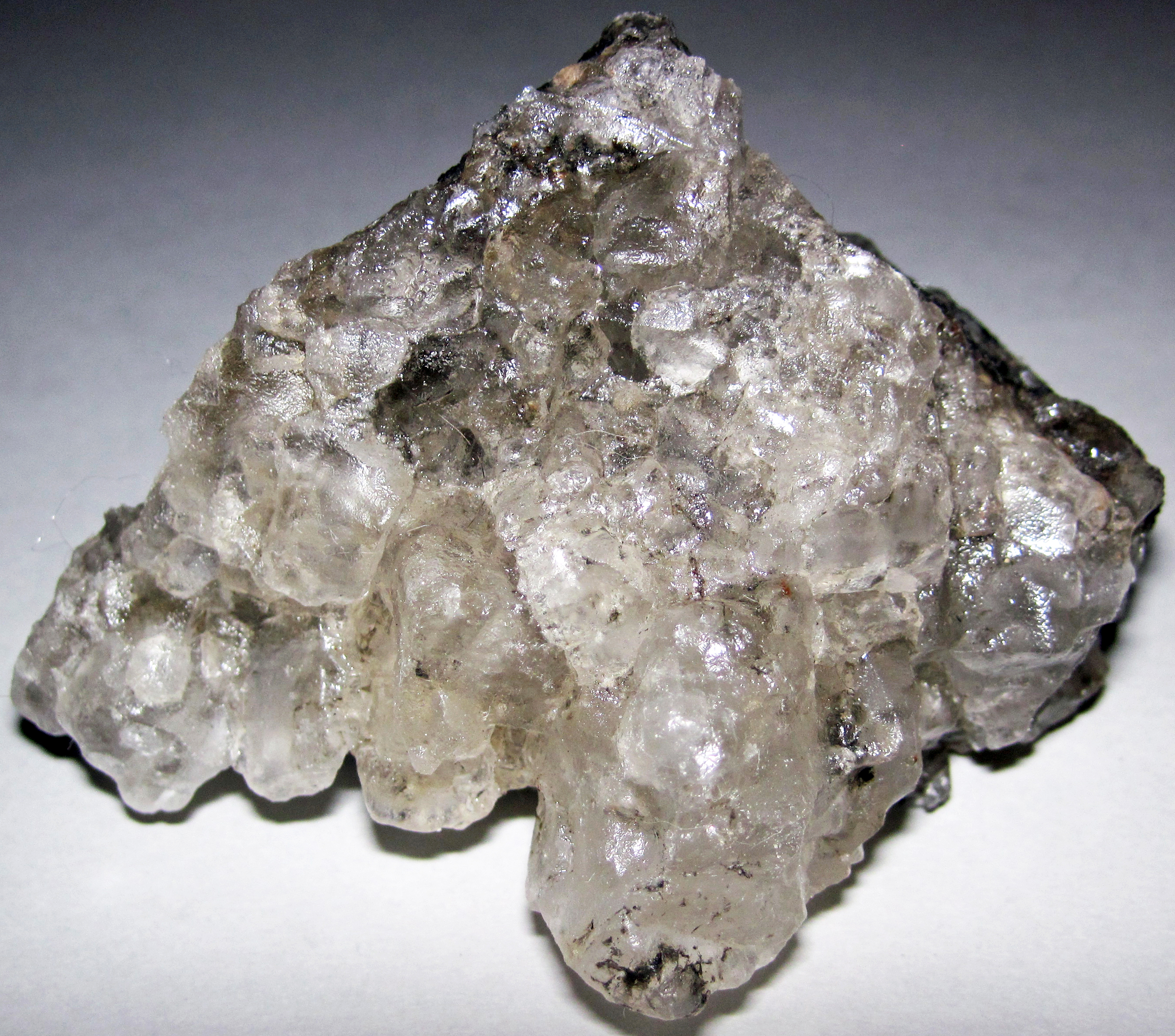
- Upper Wellington Shale excavated in the Smoky Hill River diversion channel at Indian Rock Park, Salina, Kansas Halitite (Hutchinson Salt Member, Wellington Formation).
- Type: Formation
- Unit of: Sumner Group
- Sub-units: Lower Wellington Member, Hutchinson Salt Member, Carlton Limestone Member, Upper Wellington Member
- Underlies: Central-Western Kansas: (relative to the Sixth principal meridian); East: Kiowa Shale; Over: Pleistocene terraces West: Ninnescah Shale; Northcentral Oklahoma: Hennessey Formation; Garber Sandstone
- Overlies: Nolans Limestone
- Thickness: 500–700 ft (150–210 m)

Lithology
- Primary: Shale/mudstone/dolomite; Salt/anhydrite/gypsum

Location
- Coordinates: 38.6°N 97.2°W
- Approximate paleocoordinates: 3.6°N 25.8°W
- Region: Kansas; Oklahoma
- Country: United States

Type section
- Named for: Wellington, Kansas
- Named by: F. W. Cragin
- Wellington Formation (the United States) Wellington Formation (Kansas)

The Wellington Formation is an Early Permian geologic formation in Kansas and Oklahoma, also known informally as "Wellington shales" for softer, thinly bedded, grey rock hundreds of feet thick. The formation's Hutchinson Salt Member is more recognized by the community than the formation itself, and the salt is still mined in central Kansas. The Wellington provides a rich record of Permian insects and its beddings provide evidence for the reconstruction of tropical paleoclimates of the Icehouse Permian with the ability in cases to measure the passage of seasons. Tens of thousands of insect fossils recovered from the Wellington shales are kept in major collections at the Harvard Museum of Comparative Zoology and Yale Peabody Museum of Natural History.

== Description ==
Initially described as marine shales, the 500–700 feet (150–210 m) thick Wellington appears mostly as dark gray, thinly bedded soft rock, much of it terrestrial, with sediments from fresh water ponds and salt lakes. There are several variable beds of anhydrite and gypsum and the central body of most of the formation is a massive salt bed. Localized red beds and green shales indicate conditions of exposed soils with shallow freshwater tables. Marine fossils are limited to the lowest beds while the remainder features freshwater species and land life, particularly insects and reptiles.

== Distribution ==
Compared to the earlier Permian rock formations in the midcontinent, the Wellington is somewhat more restricted in range. The Wellington is identified in western Kansas, northwest Oklahoma, and the northeast corner of the Texas Panhandle, but with no identification in Nebraska (compare with relative extension of the underlying Chase Group into Nebraska and Eastern Kansas). The surface outcrop lies generally along or between the north–south highways U.S. 81 and U.S. 77. South of Salina into northern Oklahoma, the westward dipping Wellington lies under a broad, shallow valley; here, the upper Wellington has collapsed as the Hutchinson Salt member has dissolved, forming lowlands including the McPherson Valley Wetlands and the Wellington-McPherson Lowlands. West of this valley, the Wellington shales gradually slope deeper underground beneath the Ninnescah Shale, but the unit extends no further West than the western Kansas border.

== Paleoclimate ==
At a time of extreme global glaciation, the location of the Wellington deposit was equatorial and glacier-free. The climate was generally arid but with cyclic variation in global temperatures and precipitation recorded by layers of windblown dust deposited in the basin.

== Fauna ==
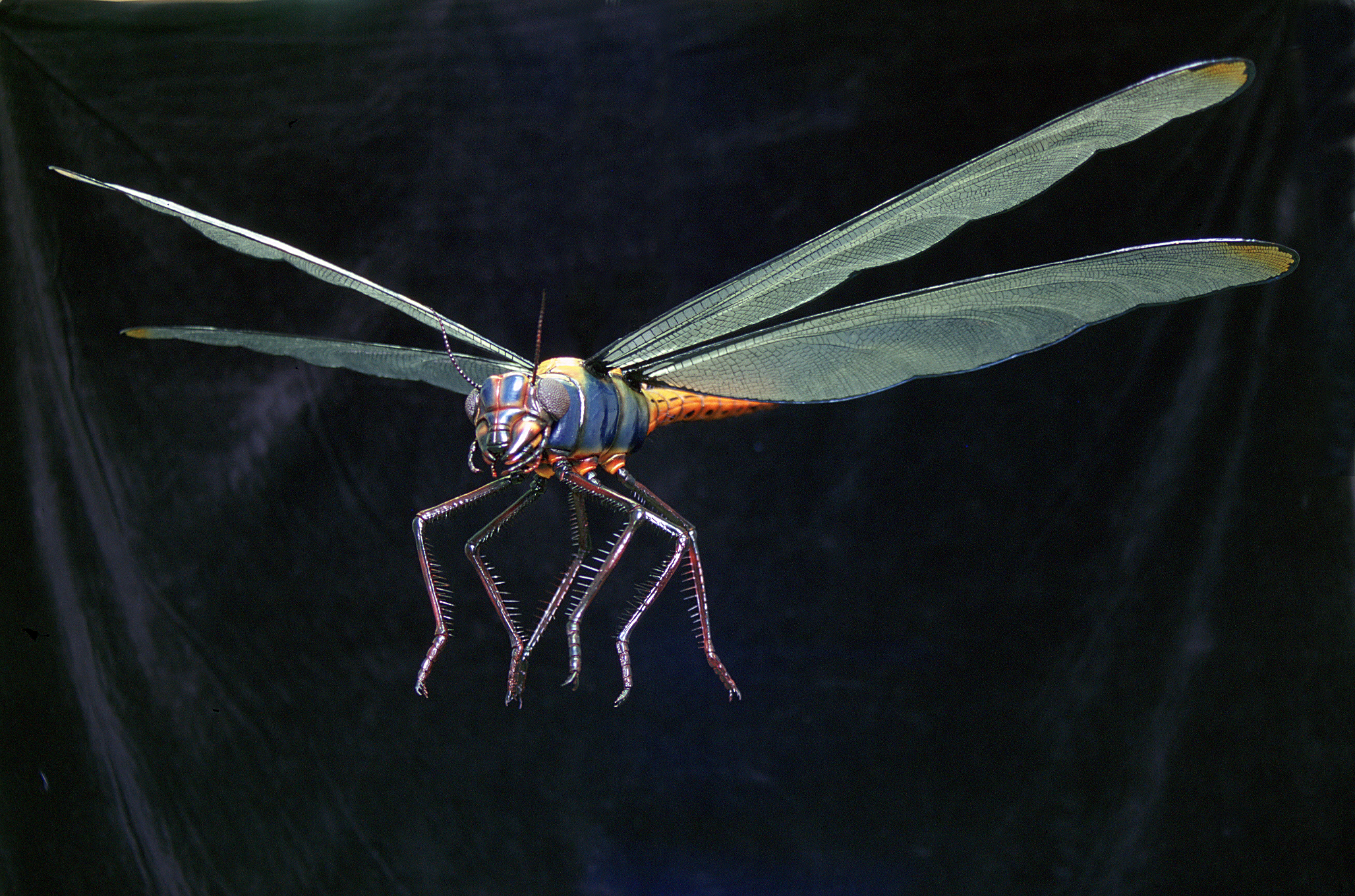
A life-size reconstruction of Meganeuropsis permianum with wingspan of 72 centimetres (28 in).

The habitable environment, while initially a marine embayment, was primarily non-marine, with great many cyclic variations between dry, fresh water, brackish water, and brine.

=== Marine (lowest shale) ===
- Lingula, marine Brachiopod

=== Brackish-water ===
- Myalina meeki, Bivalvia

=== Fresh-water ===
- Clam shrimp, measurable passage of seasons
- Productae dunbaris, lake clam

=== Terrestrial Insects ===
- Meganeuropsis permianum, largest known winged insect
- Asthenohymen minutus, large Permian insect

== Stratigraphy ==
The Wellington is not particularly rigorously divided into subunits as few easily identifiable features are consistent other than the dark shale; but certain subdivisions are recognized. Broadly, the Wellington shales are divided into an upper Wellington shale member and a lower Wellington shale member. However, these informally named divisions are based only upon the position of the Hutchinson Salt Member in the general middle of the formation, which is usually but not always present.

Some limestone beds, typically dolomite, are observed within these upper and lower shale divisions, variously ranked as members, and the otherwise unnamed adjoining shales may be classified with the named limestones. Like the salt, each is not always recognizably present.

=== Upper shale ===
The upper Wellington consists primarily of interbedded cycles of gray anhydritic mudrock and red mudrock, but includes limited beds of discontinuous limestone and dolomite.

Milan Limestone is the marker bed for the top of the upper Wellington, but it is not always present, its absence visibly obscuring the contact with the overlying Ninnescah Shale. Its appearance is typically a succession of discontinuous, thin carbonate beds. One outcrop is in the bank of the Chikaskia River south of Milan, Kansas, where it consists of three beds of dolomite separated by shale, all with green flecks of malachite.

Three-finger dolomite is an approximate 20 foot zone containing three relatively thin dolomite beds, informally named in south-central Kansas. These beds are under study for their role in the destructive and fatal 2001 Yaggy/Hutchinson natural gas storage leak. However, these beds might correspond with the Milan Limestone.

=== Hutchinson Salt ===
Hutchinson Salt consists of repeating beds of salt, anhydrite, and gray shale, totaling up to 300 feet (91 m). The unit is present in much of central Kansas and north-central Oklahoma. The member is encountered in oil and gas exploration throughout the region. The salt has been mined with both shaft mining and dissolution mining. Mining communities include Hutchinson, Lyons, Kingman, and Kanoplis. Where the Hutchinson Salt is near the surface, it can be dissolved by the normal circulation of fresh groundwater. The dissolving salt results in collapse of overlying rock and the discharge of salt into surface water, degrading some freshwater sources.

=== Lower shale ===
The lower Wellington consists of interbedded cycles of gray anhydritic mudrock and anhydrite, the anhydrite and gypsum being quarried in some locations. The lower shale includes several discontinuous beds of limestone and dolostone. In some locations, these thin limestone beds are sufficiently resistant that they influence the landscape; some are even geologically mappable on the local scale. The very lowest beds of the lower Wellington are the only representation of marine environment within the Wellington Formation.

Carlton Limestone is a locally ledge-forming, mappable marker bed for the lower Wellington outcrop. It is associated with "Carlton Insect Beds", although a number of other insect beds are known within the upper and lower Wellington.

Hollenberg Limestone is also a ledge-forming, locally mappable marker bed for the lower Wellington surface topography.

Annelly gypsum is named for Annelly, Kansas, and overlies the Geuda Springs shale member. The alabaster and selenite forms of gypsum are both also present, and were mined at the mineral springs resort community of Geuda Springs, Kansas. Although not an ideal building material, the Annelly alabaster that was quarried there, locally called "marble", was used in the construction of the so-called "marble block" of the historic Smith commercial building in Wellington, Kansas.

== Access ==
As a shale, the Wellington Formation has limited exposures, but tends towards forming moderate soil-covered slopes below Kiowa Sandstone caprocks. This is aggravated by the fact that when the Wellington is close to the surface, ground water dissolves the salt, causing the upper Wellington shales to sink and become covered by river and lake muds.

=== Hutchinson salt mining ===
Hutchinson, Kansas has been a focus of extraction of salt from the Hutchinson Salt Member. Several geological tourism opportunities occur underground within the Hutchinson salt mine in relation to the Strataca Salt Mine Museum, including overnight camping for organized groups, underground foot and bicycle races, and a special annual "Hunt for Red Rock-tober" tour where guided visitors may access and collect from the mine's tailing piles of red salt, generally considered to be a contaminated waste product.

=== Interstate 70: Kiowa/Wellington bluffs ===
Following Interstate 70 in Northcentral Kansas, just east of Salina, travelers are guided over a scenic range of hills between the broad Saline and Solomon valleys. Here, the collapsing Hutchinson Salt Member and predominately red Ninnescah Shale are both absent and these bluffs are the result of erosion of resistant sandstones in the Kiowa overlying the relatively tough and stable shales of the upper Wellington. The result is lower bluffs that are geologically similar to the higher bluffs formed by the Dakota Formation over Ninnescah Shale just west of Salina.

=== Coronado Hill: Hutchinson Salt dissolution valley ===
Coronado Hill is one of the Dakota remnant hills forming the hummocky outliers of the Smoky Hill Buttes range of the Smoky Hills. From the Coronado Heights public park atop Coronado Hill, the landforms are visible, resulting from the interaction of the resistant Dakota and Kiowa sandstones, the less resistant Ninnescah and Wellington shales, and the dissolution of the Hutchinson Salt Member.

South of Coronado Hill lies the original and present course of the Smoky Hill River. Here, flowing out of the Smoky Hills in the west, the river previously continued to the southeast, but its present course is east across the valley then turning north to Salina. This broad north–south valley is largely the result of collapsing formations as the Hutchinson Salt Member was dissolved. The slopes of Coronado Hill are the Kiowa Shale, the Ninnescah Shale extends from the lower slopes to the valley floor, and the full thickness of the Wellington Formation with intact Hutchinson Salt lies beneath the Ninnescah Shale below this side of the valley floor.

On the bluffs visible on the far east side of the valley, the Ninnescah Shale is completely missing and the Wellington Formation rises over 100 feet (30 m) above the bottom of the valley. The Hutchinson Salt Member did not extend as far east as these bluffs, so these present bluffs are stable and beyond the eastern extent of the collapse.

A head of the forming Kansas River reached south through the collapse to capture the Smoky Hill River, which is why the river today makes a 24 miles (39 km) jog to the north to the upper Kansas Valley.

=== Indian Rock Park, Salina: Upper Wellington excavation ===
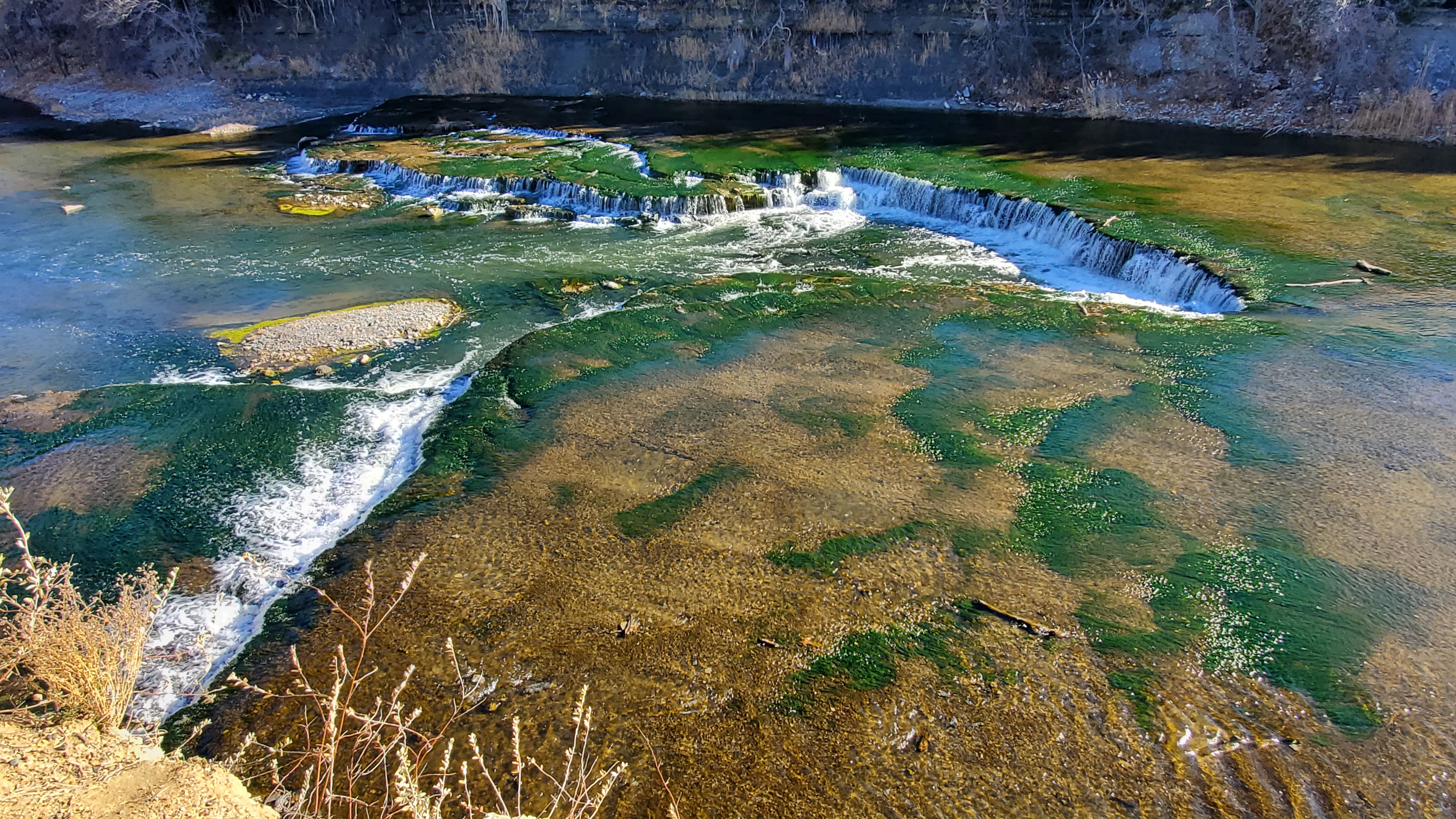
Waterfall over a dolomite bed in the upper Wellington Formation in the Indian Rock diversion channel

In the late 1950s, as part of a Diversion By-pass and Flood Control project for Salina, a diversion channel was excavated through the Indian Hill prominence of the Kiowa/Wellington bluffs at the turn of the Smoky Hill River. Roughly 80 feet (24 m) of upper Wellington Shale are exposed from the excavation, including a color change higher on the sides and short waterfalls over resistant layers of dolomite. Indian Rock Park includes this hill and the surrounding area with fields, cliffs, and recreational trails. Glennifer Hill Drive leads to the hilltop for parking, a panoramic city view, and trails into the diversion channel as well as to the Wellington shale exposed by the abandoned brick factory quarry now named Indian Rock Lake.

=== Interstate 70: Russell County sinkholes ===
Early oil exploration in western Kansas focused largely on the Carboniferous formations, such as the Kansas City-Lansing limestones at a depth of 3,300 feet (1.0 km). The higher Permian formation is important to this exploration both as marker horizons as well as a relatively impervious protective barrier between the brines of the Permian formations and the fresh water of the surface aquifers used for domestic supplies. Particularly, this means that the thousands of oil wells in western Kansas must penetrate the Hutchinson Salt Member and other beds of soluble salt, anhydrite, and gypsum of the upper Permian rocks to reach the hydrocarbon reserves.

During World War II, steel outer casings were recovered from completed cable-drilled wells in Russell County, but the wells were not correctly sealed. The lack of cement casing and plugging means that surface fresh water now drains down the well bores and on passing through the salt, anhydrite, and gypsum beds dissolves and carries away those minerals. This dissolution causes water-filled voids 1,300 to 1,600 feet (490 m) below the surface, still enlarging and slowly collapsing today, causing active sinkholes. As no strong formations lie above the Hutchinson Salt (only soft shale, sand, and very thin chalk) the sinking is very steady and gradual.

Interstate 70 was knowingly constructed over three of these sinkholes west of Russell, Kansas. The lanes have been elevated repeatedly since construction and an adjoining overpass was removed to avoid its impending collapse. All three sinkholes hold open fresh water in wet periods. The Crawford Sinkhole is the deepest of the three and holds water continuously, becoming a local wetlands environment.

== See also ==
- List of fossiliferous stratigraphic units in Kansas
- List of fossiliferous stratigraphic units in Oklahoma
- Paleontology in Kansas
- Paleontology in Oklahoma
