= Nellie Bly Formation =

Geologic formation in Oklahoma, United States

- Stratigraphic range: Carboniferous
- Type: Formation
- Unit of: Lower Linn Subgroup, Kansas City Group
- Underlies: Dewey Formation, Upper Linn Subgroup
- Overlies: Cherryvale Formation

Location
- Region: Iowa, Missouri, Kansas, Oklahoma
- Country: United States

The Nellie Bly Formation is a geologic formation in Oklahoma, Kansas, and Missouri. It preserves fossils dating back to the Carboniferous period.

== Characteristics ==
The Nelly Bly Formation lies above the Westerville Limestone, the uppermost strata of the Cherryvale Formation, and below the Quivira Shale Member of the Dewey Formation. The formation is absent in some areas and up to 15 feet thick in others.

The formation consists of "4 to 10 ft of gray shale with a thin discontinuous coal bed or plant fossil zone underlain by nodules of limestone in gray clay matrix" with sparse sandstone layers in the lower part.

This generally represents a non-marine or seashore near-marine area, with sandstone laid down by stream or river deposits, coal formed in swampy areas and from plant fossils indicating land or tidal areas.

== Nelly Bly Formation as part of a Cyclothem ==
All layers of the Kansas City Group are part of a series of cyclothems: Strata laid down as the sea level gradually rose and fell repeatedly over millions of years. The cyclic rise and fall of sea levels created regular cyclic deposits of non-marine/tidal shale, shallow water limestone, deep water shale, shallow water limestone, and then again non-marine/tidal shale as sea level dropped again.

The Nelly Bly Formation represents the non-marine/tidal shale zone known as "Outside Shale". And Outside Shale formation was created as the sea level gradually dropped, transitioning this area from shallow water to a tidal zone, and finally a non-marine/land environment with plant growth, river and stream deltas, and many swampy areas. Then the sea level rises again, transitioning back through the tidal zone to shallow seas.

Each of these different environments is represented in different layers of the Nelly Bly formation.

The formation's presence or absence in different areas is the result of the large differences in environment that are caused by relatively small variations in topography in a gently graded near-seashore environment. One area may be just above sea level, creating an environment conducive to plant growth and the creation of swamps and river deltas - and thus shale, plant fossils, and coal beds - while a nearby area, just a few feet lower, is a shallow marine zone conducive to the creation of limestone deposits, never experiencing the tidal or dry land conditions.

Depending on exact local topography and the exact extent of sea rise and fall, one area may experience this full cycle, another nearby area may only experience a transition from shallow water to tidal zone and back with no non-marine period, another area may experience transition from dry land to swampy near-marine environment and back, and many other such local variations. So one area may experience the conditions needed to produce the Nellie Bly Formation, while another nearby area, being a few feet higher or lower in elevation, does not.

== See also ==
- List of fossiliferous stratigraphic units in Oklahoma
- Paleontology in Oklahoma
