= Dornick (disambiguation) =

Dornick may refer to:

- Dornick is cited in the Oxford English Dictionary as a dialectal US term originating in the mid-19th century, meaning "pebble, stone or small boulder"
- Dornick (cloth), a strong linen damask used for table cloth
- Dörnick, a municipality in the district of Plön, in Schleswig-Holstein, Germany
- Tournai, a city in the Province of Hainaut, Belgium; Dornick is its obsolete German name
- Dornick Hills Group, a geologic group in Oklahoma
- Dornick Hills Golf & Country Club
- Gaal Dornick
