= Arbuckle Mountains =

Mountain range in Oklahoma, United States

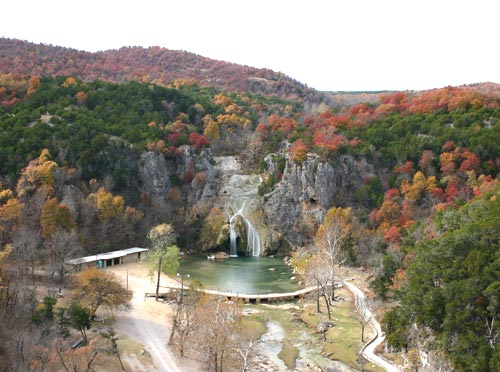
- Turner Falls, nestled in the Arbuckle Mountains of South Central Oklahoma.

Highest point
- Elevation: 430 m (1,410 ft)
- Coordinates: 34°27′24″N 97°15′14″W

Dimensions
- Area: 1,000 mi^{2} (2,600 km^{2})

Geography
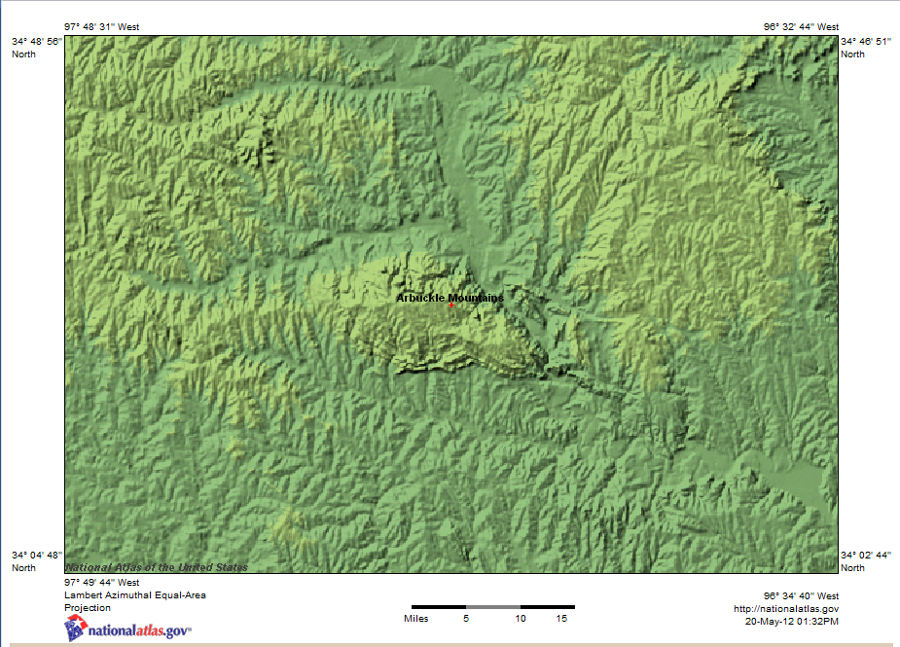
- Satellite image with shaded relief map of Arbuckle Mountains in Oklahoma
- Country: United States
- State: Oklahoma
- Counties: Murray; Carter; Pontotoc; Johnston
- Rivers: Washita
- Settlement: Cedar Village
- Range coordinates: 34°25′55″N 97°11′27″W

Geology
- Orogeny: Ouachita Orogeny
- Rock ages: Precambrian; Cambrian; Proterozoic; Pennsylvanian; Permian
- Rock type(s): granite, gneiss, limestone, dolomite, sandstone, shale

The Arbuckle Mountains are an ancient mountain range in south-central Oklahoma in the United States. They lie in Murray, Carter, Pontotoc, and Johnston counties. The granite rocks of the Arbuckles date back to the Precambrian Eon some 1.4 billion years ago which were overlain by rhyolites during the Cambrian Period. The range reaches a height of 1,412 feet above sea level. According to the U.S. Geological Survey (USGS):

The Arbuckles contain the most diverse suite of mineral resources in Oklahoma: limestone, dolomite, glass sand, granite, sand and gravel, shale, cement, iron ore, lead, zinc, tar sands, and oil and gas; all these minerals are, or have been, produced commercially.

== History ==
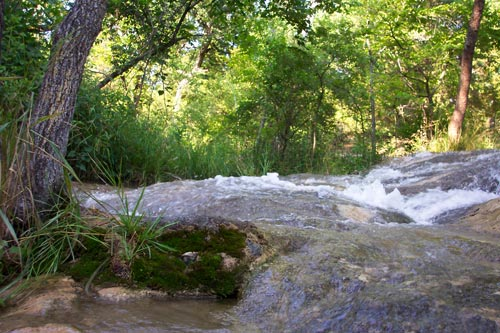
Travertine Creek, in the Chickasaw National Recreation Area, located in the foothills of the Arbuckles near Sulphur.

The Arbuckle Mountains are the oldest known formations in the United States between the Appalachian and Rocky Mountains. They contain a core of granite and gneiss that date back at least 1.4 billion years. The core is overlain by a 1,500 feet (460 m) layer of Cambrian period rhyolite that is about 525 million years old. Atop the rhyolite is about 15,000 feet (4,600 m) of folded and faulted limestones, dolomites, sandstones, and shales deposited in shallow seas from Late Cambrian through Pennsylvanian time (515 - 290 million years ago).

They were named indirectly for Gen. Matthew Arbuckle (1778–1851), a career soldier from Virginia who was active in the Indian Territory for the last thirty years of his life. Shortly before his death at Fort Smith, Arkansas, from cholera, several detachments of troops under his command had established an outpost to protect the California road, on Wildhorse Creek in present-day Garvin County, Oklahoma. The post was then named Fort Arbuckle in his honor. Though the post was abandoned in 1870, the name had already transferred in common usage to the nearby hills.

== Geology ==
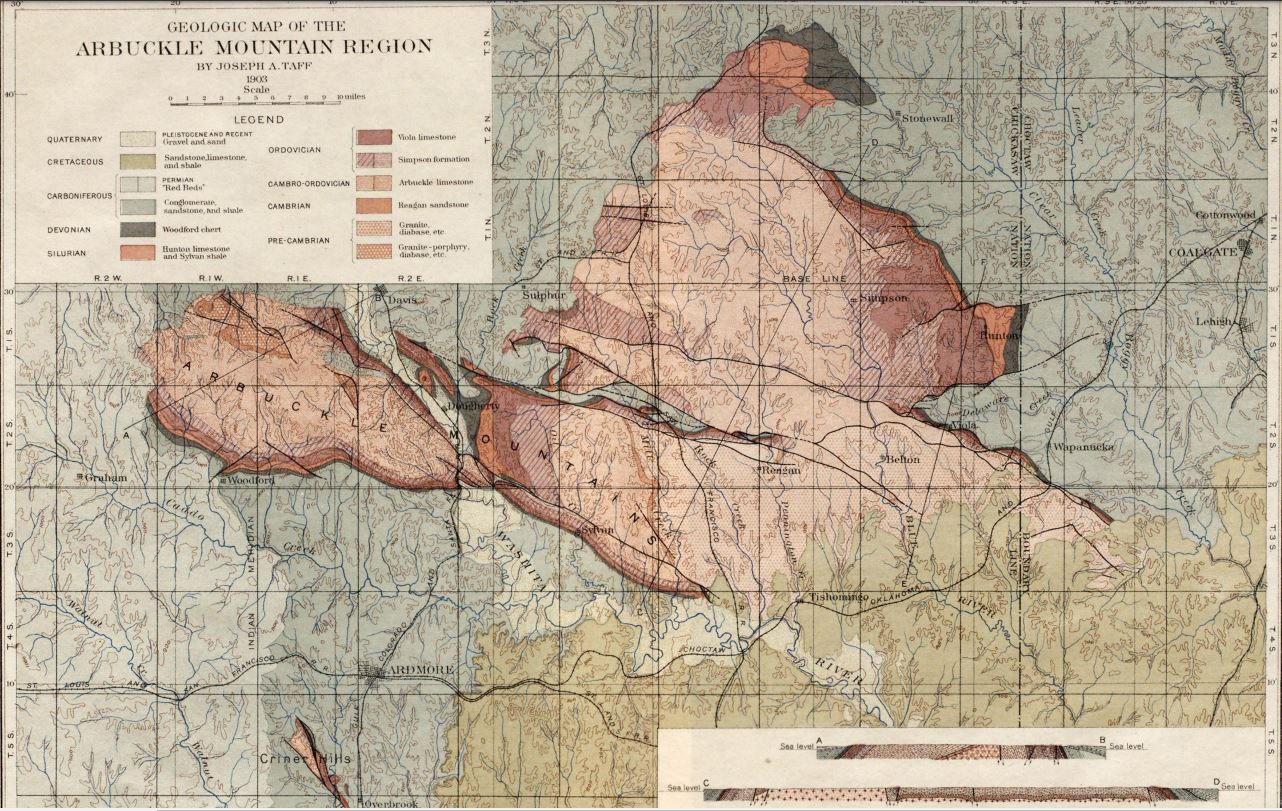
Geological map

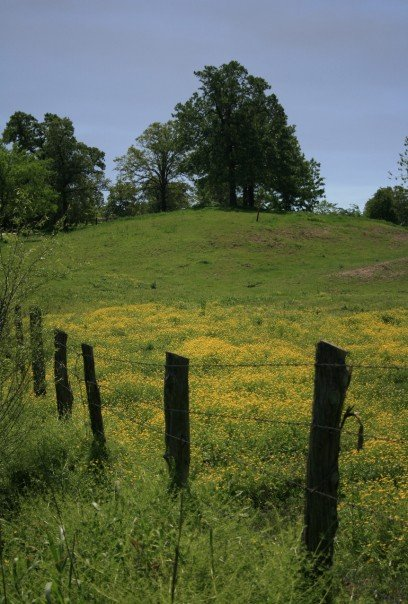
A field of flowers in the Arbuckle foothills

Geologically the Arbuckles are an elongate anticline structure with an orientation or strike of west-northwest. The core of the structure consists of Proterozoic extrusive and intrusive rocks, the Colbert rhyolite porphyry and the Tishomingo granite (age dated at 1374 Ma), which are overlain by the Arbuckle Group, the Simpson Group, Viola Group, and the Hunton Group. Uplift, faulting, and folding occurred during the Wichita Orogeny, followed by erosion.

=== Hydrology and karst features ===
Underlying the Arbuckle Mountains is the Arbuckle-Simpson aquifer, housing freshwater which emanates at springs to provide the base flows of the Blue River and Honey Creek, which flows over Turner Falls south of Davis.

As a result of the karst topography, standing water is rarely found atop the Arbuckle Mountains, the water seeps through fractures and planes of separation in the limestone bedrock, dissolving the rock to produce a network of caves and solution conduits throughout the limestone formations. Organizations such as the Arbuckle Karst Conservancy and Arbuckle Mountains Grotto of the National Speleological Society actively study the karst features of the Arbuckle Mountains to preserve the biological ecosystems and groundwater resources. The organizations currently maintain databases of more than 1,000 caves and springs in the Arbuckle Mountains. The Arbuckles have gradually eroded to their present heights of 300–500 feet above the surrounding terrain or 1300–1400 feet above sea level.

== Recreation and access ==
Visitors explore "Devil's Bathtub" at Falls Creek

The range is approximately 35 miles (56 km) east-to-west and 10–15 miles north-to-south. The main part of the range is located in northern Carter County and southern Murray County, approximately 15 miles (24 km) north of Ardmore and 5 miles (8.0 km) south of Davis, Oklahoma on Interstate 35. The eastern flank of the ridge is approximately 5 miles (8.0 km) south of Sulphur on U.S. Highway 177.

Popular recreation areas in the Arbuckle Mountains include Turner Falls Park, the Chickasaw National Recreation Area, and Lake of the Arbuckles. Turner Falls is located 5 miles (8.0 km) south of Davis, whereas Chickasaw NRA is located in the city of Sulphur.

The area is also the location of several campgrounds, including the YMCA's Camp Classen and the Baptist General Convention of Oklahoma's Falls Creek Baptist Conference Center, which hosts 55,000 campers each summer.

== Bibliography ==
- James S. Aber, Arbuckle Mountains, Oklahoma
- Robert W. Allen, 2002, Complex Structural Features of the Ardmore Basin
- USGS America's Volcanic Past: Oklahoma
