= Chapman Ranch Formation =

Geologic formation in Oklahoma, US

- Stratigraphic range: Ordovician
- Type: Formation

Location
- Region: Oklahoma
- Country: United States

The Chapman Ranch Formation is a geologic formation in Oklahoma. It preserves fossils dating back to the Ordovician period.

== See also ==
- List of fossiliferous stratigraphic units in Oklahoma
- Paleontology in Oklahoma
