= Leonard Series =

- Stratigraphic range: Permian
- Type: Group

Location
- Region: Oklahoma
- Country: United States

The Leonard Series is a geologic group in Oklahoma. It preserves fossils dating back to the Permian period.

== See also ==
- List of fossiliferous stratigraphic units in Oklahoma
- Paleontology in Oklahoma
