= Bois d'Arc Formation =

Geologic formation in Oklahoma, United States

- Stratigraphic range: Devonian
- Type: Formation
- Unit of: Hunton Group

Location
- Region: Oklahoma
- Country: United States

Type section
- Named for: Bois d'Arc Creek, Pontotoc County, Oklahoma
- Named by: Chester A. Reeds, 1911

The Bois d'Arc Formation is a geologic formation in Oklahoma. It preserves fossils dating back to the Devonian period.

== See also ==
- List of fossiliferous stratigraphic units in Oklahoma
- Paleontology in Oklahoma
