= Welden Limestone =

American geographical formation

- Stratigraphic range: Carboniferous
- Type: Formation

Location
- Region: Oklahoma
- Country: United States

The Welden Limestone is a geologic formation in Oklahoma. It preserves fossils dating back to the Carboniferous period. It is restricted to the Lawrence Uplift of southern Oklahoma. In this region, the Welden Limestone is the only carbonate unit deposited during the span of time from Late Devonian to the Pennsylvanian.

The Welden Limestone crops out as a narrow northwest to southeast belt running through sections of Pontotoc County, Oklahoma. It overlies the Woodford and pre-Welden shales and underlies the Caney Shale. The Welden Limestone is a ledge of medium-bedded limestone that separates the Woodford slope from the shale slope of the Caney. It ranges in thickness from 0.85 m in the north to 1.4 m in the south.

The Welden Limestone is primarily a biowackestone with some intervals of biopackstone and biograinstone. It is composed predominantly of skeletal fragments, particularly of trilobites and ostracods, as well as bryozoans, brachiopods, crinoids, foraminifera and conodonts.

== See also ==
- List of fossiliferous stratigraphic units in Oklahoma
- Paleontology in Oklahoma
