= El Reno Group =

- Stratigraphic range: Permian
- Type: Group

Location
- Region: Oklahoma
- Country: United States

The El Reno Group is a geologic group in Oklahoma. It preserves fossils dating back to the Permian period. The Chickasha Formation, which is part of this group, contains the geologically most recent Permian continental vertebrates (Roadian) known from North America. These include one of the most recent lepospondyls, a dissorophoid, and some fragmentary fossils of Steppesaurus that Everett C. Olson interpreted as one of the oldest known therapsids, an interpretation that has not been widely accepted.

== See also ==
- List of fossiliferous stratigraphic units in Oklahoma
- Paleontology in Oklahoma
