= Viola Formation =

Geologic formation in Oklahoma, United States

- Stratigraphic range: Ordovician
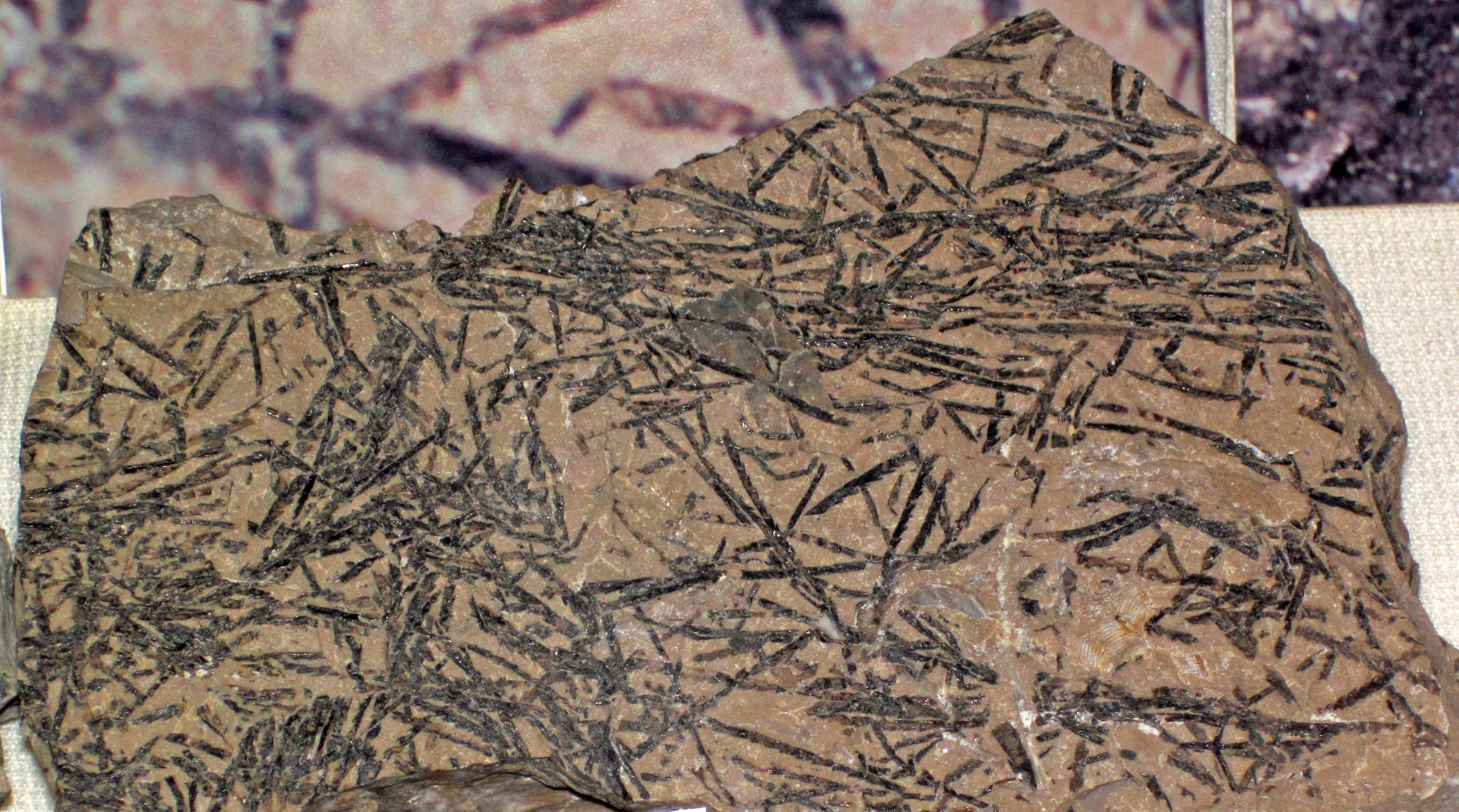
- Fossils from the Viola Formation
- Type: Formation

Location
- Region: Oklahoma
- Country: United States

Type section
- Named for: Viola, Johnston County, Oklahoma
- Named by: Joseph A. Taff, 1902

The Viola Formation is a geologic formation in Oklahoma. It preserves fossils dating back to the Ordovician period.

== See also ==
- List of fossiliferous stratigraphic units in Oklahoma
- Paleontology in Oklahoma
