= Oologah Formation =

Geologic formation in Oklahoma, United States

- Stratigraphic range: Carboniferous
- Type: Formation

Lithology
- Primary: Limestone

Location
- Region: Oklahoma
- Country: United States

Type section
- Named for: Oologah, Rogers County, Oklahoma
- Named by: Noah Fields Drake, 1897

The Oologah Formation is a geologic formation in Oklahoma. It preserves fossils dating back to the Carboniferous period.

== See also ==
- List of fossiliferous stratigraphic units in Oklahoma
- Paleontology in Oklahoma
