= Henryhouse Formation =

Geologic formation in Oklahoma, U.S.

- Stratigraphic range: Silurian
- Type: Formation
- Unit of: Hunton Group

Location
- Region: Oklahoma
- Country: United States

Type section
- Named for: Henryhouse Creek, Carter County, Oklahoma
- Named by: Chester A. Reeds, 1911

The Henryhouse Formation is a geologic formation in Oklahoma. It preserves fossils dating back to the Silurian period.

== See also ==
- List of fossiliferous stratigraphic units in Oklahoma
- Paleontology in Oklahoma
