= Ada Formation =

Geologic formation in Oklahoma, U.S.

- Stratigraphic range: Late Pennsylvanian
- Type: Formation

Location
- Region: Oklahoma
- Country: United States

Type section
- Named for: Ada, Pontotoc Co, OK

The Ada Formation is a geologic formation in Oklahoma, within and to west of Ada. It consist mainly of shale with numerous limestone layers which get thinner and eventually disappear to the south, where they are replaced by fine-grained sandstone. Fossils are rare. Disarticulated remains of Eryops, Diasparactus, and Ophiacodon from the Ada Formation represent the first finds of these genera in Oklahoma.

== See also ==
- List of fossiliferous stratigraphic units in Oklahoma
- Paleontology in Oklahoma
