= Wewoka Shale =

Geologic formation in Oklahoma

- Stratigraphic range: Carboniferous
- Type: Formation

Location
- Region: Oklahoma
- Country: United States

Type section
- Named for: Wewoka, Seminole County, Oklahoma
- Named by: Joseph A. Taff, 1901

The Wewoka Shale is a geologic formation in Oklahoma. It preserves fossils dating back to the Carboniferous period.

== See also ==
- List of fossiliferous stratigraphic units in Oklahoma
- Paleontology in Oklahoma
