= Golf course (disambiguation) =

A golf course is the grounds where the game of golf is played.

Golf Course may also refer to:

- Golf Course metro station, of the Delhi Metro
- Golf Course Formation, a geologic formation in Oklahoma
