= Keel Formation =

Geologic formation in Oklahoma, United States

- Stratigraphic range: Ordovician
- Type: Formation
- Unit of: Chimneyhill Formation, Hunton Group

Location
- Region: Oklahoma
- Country: United States

Thin section of ooids in the Keel Formation (Silurian), Oklahoma.

The Keel Formation is a geologic formation in Oklahoma. It preserves fossils dating back to the Ordovician period.

== See also ==
- List of fossiliferous stratigraphic units in Oklahoma
- Paleontology in Oklahoma
