= Deese Group =

Geologic group in Oklahoma, USA

- Stratigraphic range: Carboniferous
- Type: Group

Location
- Region: Oklahoma
- Country: United States

The Deese Group is a geologic group in Oklahoma. It preserves fossils dating back to the Carboniferous period.

== See also ==
- List of fossiliferous stratigraphic units in Oklahoma
- Paleontology in Oklahoma
