= Arbuckle Group =

- Stratigraphic range: Ordovician
- Type: Group

Location
- Region: Oklahoma
- Country: United States

Type section
- Named for: Matthew Arbuckle

The Arbuckle Group is a geologic group in Oklahoma. It preserves fossils dating back to the Ordovician period.

== See also ==
- Arbuckle Mountains
- List of fossiliferous stratigraphic units in Oklahoma
- Paleontology in Oklahoma
- Oklahoma earthquake swarms (2009–present)
