= Wetumka Formation =

Geologic formation in Oklahoma

- Stratigraphic range: Carboniferous
- Type: Formation

Location
- Region: Oklahoma
- Country: United States

Type section
- Named for: Presumably, Wetumka, Hughes County, Oklahoma
- Named by: Joseph A. Taff, 1901

The Wetumka Formation is a geologic formation in Oklahoma. It preserves fossils dating back to the Carboniferous period.

== See also ==
- List of fossiliferous stratigraphic units in Oklahoma
- Paleontology in Oklahoma
