= Duncan Formation =

Geologic formation in Oklahoma, United States

- Stratigraphic range: Permian
- Type: Formation

Location
- Region: Oklahoma
- Country: United States

Type section
- Named for: Duncan, Stephens County, Oklahoma
- Named by: Charles Newton Gould, 1924

The Duncan Formation is a geologic formation in Oklahoma. It preserves fossils dating back to the Permian period.

== See also ==
- List of fossiliferous stratigraphic units in Oklahoma
- Paleontology in Oklahoma
