= Parajito Formation =

Geologic formation in Oklahoma, United States

- Stratigraphic range: Cretaceous
- Type: Formation

Location
- Region: Oklahoma
- Country: United States

The Parajito Formation is a geologic formation in Oklahoma. It preserves fossils dating back to the Cretaceous period.

== See also ==
- List of fossiliferous stratigraphic units in Oklahoma
- Paleontology in Oklahoma
