= Vilas Shale =

Geologic formation in KS and OK, US

- Stratigraphic range: Carboniferous
- Type: Formation
- Unit of: Lansing Group

Location
- Region: Kansas, Oklahoma
- Country: United States

The Vilas Shale is a geologic formation in Kansas and Oklahoma. It preserves fossils dating back to the Carboniferous period.

== See also ==
- List of fossiliferous stratigraphic units in Kansas
- Paleontology in Kansas
