= Hartshorne Formation =

Geologic formation in Arkansas and Oklahoma, US

- Stratigraphic range: Carboniferous
- Type: Formation
- Underlies: McAlester Formation
- Overlies: Atoka Formation

Location
- Region: Arkansas, Oklahoma
- Country: United States

Type section
- Named by: J.A. Taff

The Hartshorne Formation is a geologic formation in Arkansas and Oklahoma. It preserves fossils dating back to the Carboniferous period.

== See also ==
- List of fossiliferous stratigraphic units in Oklahoma
- Paleontology in Oklahoma
