= Chickasha Formation =

Geologic formation in Oklahoma, United States

- Stratigraphic range: Roadian
- Type: Formation

Location
- Region: Oklahoma
- Country: United States

Type section
- Named for: Chickasha, Grady County, Oklahoma
- Named by: Charles Newton Gould, 1924

The Chickasha Formation, which is part of the El Reno Group, is a geologic formation in Oklahoma. It preserves fossils dating back to the Roadian stage of the Middle Permian. These include, among others, the dissorophoid temnospondyl Nooxobeia gracilis, the lepospondyl Diplocaulus parvus (Amphibia: Nectridea), and the captorhinid Rothianiscus robusta, initially called Rothia robusta by Everett C. Olson. Many of these fossils were indicated to have come from the Flowerpot Shale, but these actually come from the Chickasha Formation, according to the current nomenclature. The age of the formation was long debated because Olson based part of his argument on fragmentary fossils that he interpreted as therapsids, an interpretation that was not widely accepted. Worse, one of them, Watongia, was later shown to be a varanopid.

== See also ==
- List of fossiliferous stratigraphic units in Oklahoma
- Paleontology in Oklahoma
