= Boggy Formation =

Geologic formation in Arkansas and Oklahoma, United States

- Stratigraphic range: Pennsylvanian
- Type: Formation
- Overlies: Savanna Formation

Location
- Region: Arkansas, Oklahoma
- Country: United States

Type section
- Named by: J.A. Taff

The Boggy Formation is a geologic formation in Arkansas and Oklahoma. It preserves fossils dating back to the Carboniferous period.

== Paleontology ==
- Amithorthoceras

A. unicamera

- Arkbuckleoceras

A. tricamerae

- Bitaunioceras

B. buckhornense

- Cyrtorthoracoceras?
- Dolorthoceras

D. boggyense

- Pseudorthoceras

P. knoxense

- Sueroceras

S. oklahomense

- Sulphurnites

S. taffi

- Unklesbayoceras

U. striatulum

== See also ==
- List of fossiliferous stratigraphic units in Arkansas
- List of fossiliferous stratigraphic units in Oklahoma
- Paleontology in Arkansas
- Paleontology in Oklahoma
