= Ochelata Group =

- Stratigraphic range: Carboniferous
- Type: Group
- Sub-units: Torpedo Sandstone, Wann Formation

Location
- Region: Kansas
- Country: United States

The Ochelata Group is a geologic group in Kansas. It preserves fossils dating back to the Carboniferous period.

== See also ==
- List of fossiliferous stratigraphic units in Kansas
- Paleontology in Kansas
