= Whitehorse Formation =

Geologic formation in United States

- Stratigraphic range: Permian
- Type: Formation

Location
- Region: Nebraska, Oklahoma
- Country: United States

Type section
- Named for: Whitehorse Springs, Woods County, Oklahoma
- Named by: Charles Newton Gould, 1905

The Whitehorse Formation is a geologic formation in Nebraska and Oklahoma. It preserves fossils dating back to the Permian period.

== See also ==
- List of fossiliferous stratigraphic units in Nebraska
- Paleontology in Nebraska
