= Sumner Group =

Sedimentary geologic group

- Stratigraphic range: Lower Permian
- Type: Group
- Sub-units: Stone Corral Formation, Ninnescah Shale, Wellington Formation
- Underlies: Nippewalla Group
- Overlies: Chase Group

Lithology
- Primary: Shale, dolomite
- Other: Salt, anhydrite, mudstone

Location
- Region: Kansas
- Country: United States

Type section
- Named for: Sumner County, Kansas
- Named by: F.W. Cragin
- Year defined: 1896

The Sumner Group is a sedimentary geologic group of Lower Permian age. It is defined in east-central Kansas and extends into Oklahoma and Nebraska as well as the Colorado subsurface where it is undivided.

== See also ==
- List of fossiliferous stratigraphic units in Kansas
- Paleontology in Kansas
