= Dornick =

Dornick is cited in the Oxford English Dictionary as a dialectal US term originating around the 1840s, meaning "pebble, stone or small boulder". The OED found the earliest occurrence of the word at in the Daily Pennant (St. Louis) and suggests a derivation from Irish "dornóg" (small stone), alternate spelling "doirneog" (round stone, handstone).

The Cassell Dictionary of Slang notes it was also used to mean "coin".

"Hard as dornick" was a colloquial way of affirming a man's toughness in Indiana in 1939.

== Particular usages ==
Cartoonist George Herriman used "dornick" frequently in his strip Krazy Kat to refer to the brick which Ignatz Mouse threw at Krazy's head in most episodes.

In his screenplay for the 1936 sequel After the Thin Man, author Dashiell Hammett narratively describes a note thrown through a window wrapped around "a stone" but tells the police "Somebody wrapped it around a dornick and heaved it through my window."

The word and its variant spelling, "Donnick," persist in placenames, for example, Oak Donnick Floodway on the St. Francis River. Another area on the St. Francis in Clay County, Arkansas is known as "Hickory Donnick" and local residents of the Lake City, Arkansas area refer to "Cane Donnick," also on the St. Francis River, in the vicinity of "Cane Island" (an erstwhile community across the river from Lake City). The community of Donnick, Arkansas is located just downstream in Poinsett County.

Dornick also refers to a thick cloth which gets its name from the Flemish town 'Doornick' where it was first manufactured.

In the pulp magazine "The Land of Terror", which came out in April 1933, author Lester Dent, writing under the name Kenneth Robeson, tells of a lost world explored by adventurer Doc Savage. At one point he writes "He came to a vast dornick which had a deeply corrugated surface."
