= Wann Formation =

Geologic formation

- Stratigraphic range: Pennsylvanian
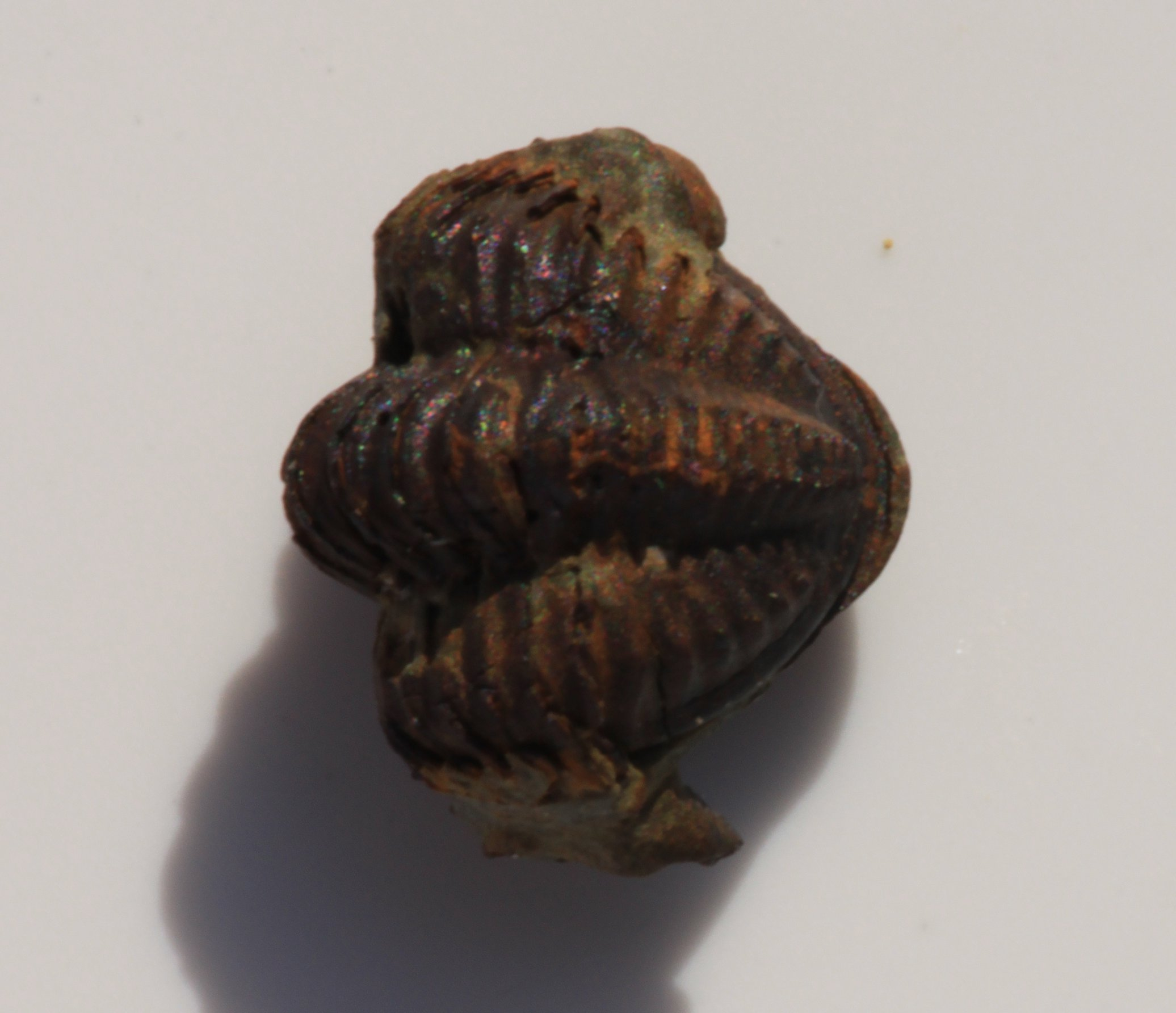
- Fossil from the Wann Formation (Oklahoma)
- Type: Formation
- Unit of: Ochelata Group
- Sub-units: Copan Member, Hogshooter Limestone

Location
- Region: Kansas, Oklahoma
- Country: United States

Type section
- Named for: Wann, Nowata County, Oklahoma
- Named by: Daniel Webster Ohern, 1910

The Wann Formation is a geologic formation in Kansas and Oklahoma. It preserves fossils dating back to the Carboniferous period.

== See also ==
- List of fossiliferous stratigraphic units in Kansas
- Paleontology in Kansas
