= Simpson Group =

- Stratigraphic range: Ordovician
- Type: Group
- Sub-units: Bromide Formation

Location
- Region: Oklahoma
- Country: United States

The Simpson Group is a geologic group in Oklahoma. It preserves fossils dating back to the Ordovician period.

== See also ==
- List of fossiliferous stratigraphic units in Oklahoma
- Paleontology in Oklahoma
