= Garber Sandstone =

Geologic formation in Oklahoma

- Stratigraphic range: Permian
- Type: Formation
- Unit of: Wichita Formation
- Underlies: Hennessey Formation
- Overlies: Chase Group
- Thickness: 100 to 400 ft

Lithology
- Primary: Sandstone
- Other: conglomerate, shale, siltstone, chert

Location
- Region: Oklahoma
- Country: United States

The Garber Sandstone is a geologic formation from the Permian Period in Oklahoma. Radiometric dates yielded an absolute age of 281 Ma, which makes it early Kungurian, according to the current geological time scale. Numerous fossils have been found in it, including various stegocephalians, namely the temnospondyls Trimerorhachis and Tersomius, the lepospondyls Brachydectes and Diplocaulus, the embolomere Archeria, the diadectomorph Diadectes, and the amniotes Captorhinus, Labidosaurikos, Ophiacodon, Dimetrodon and Araeoscelis. It serves as an important aquifer, the Garber-Wellington Aquifer, in Logan, Oklahoma, and Cleveland counties of central Oklahoma.

The upper portion of the Garber is associated with extensive baryte mineralization associated with desert rose occurrences in the outcrop area.

== See also ==
- List of fossiliferous stratigraphic units in Oklahoma
