= Cherryvale Formation =

Geologic formation in Missouri, US

- Stratigraphic range: Carboniferous
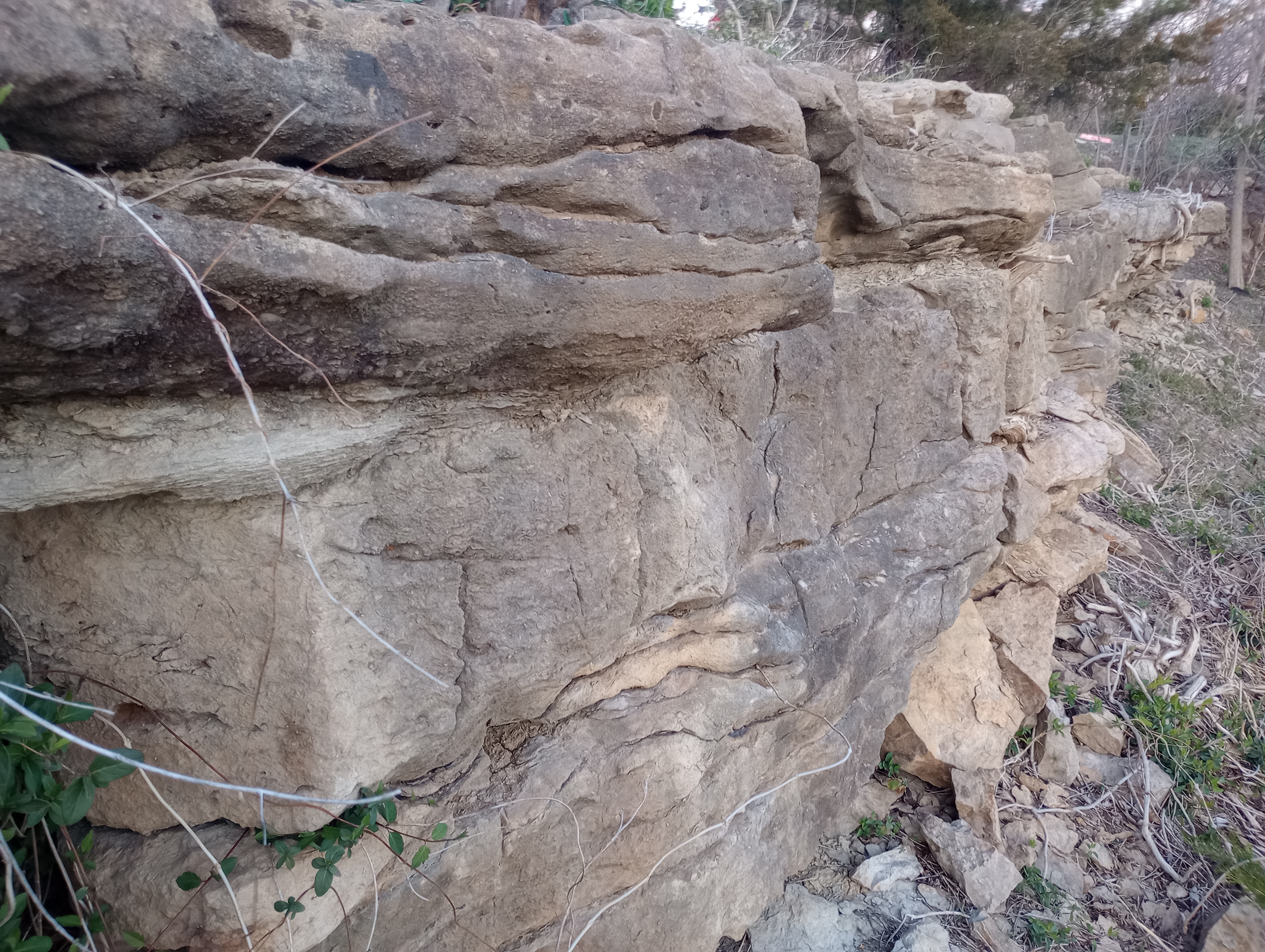
- Outcrop of Westerville Limestone, Cherryvale Formation, Lower Linn Subgroup, Kansas City Group. Raytown, Missouri.
- Type: Formation
- Unit of: Lower Linn Subgroup, Kansas City Group
- Sub-units: Fontana Shale, Block Limestone, Wea Shale, Westerville Limestone, Quivira Shale
- Underlies: Dewey Formation, Upper Linn Subgroup
- Overlies: Bronson Subgroup
- Area: Northeast Oklahoma, Eastern Kansas, Northwest Missouri, Southwest Iowa
- Thickness: 44-60 feet

Location
- Region: Missouri, Kansas, Iowa, Oklahoma
- Country: United States

Type section
- Named for: Cherryvale, Kansas

The Cherryvale Formation, previously also known as the Cherryvale Shale, is a geologic formation in Oklahoma, Kansas, Missouri, and Iowa. It preserves fossils dating back to the Carboniferous period.

== Constituent members ==
The Cherryvale Formation is the lowest member of the Lower Linn Subgroup, Kansas City Group.

The Cherryvale has five members, from lowest to highest: Fontana Shale, Block Limestone, Wea Shale, Westerville Limestone, and Quivira Shale. The formation varies in thickness from about 44 to 60 feet.

The formation takes its name from outcrops near Cherryvale, Kansas.

=== Geological time period ===
The Kansas City Group is part of the Missourian Series, dating to approximately 307 to 303.7 Ma. This equates to the Kasimovian Stage of the ICS geologic timescale.

The Missourian Series is the third of four stages the Pennsylvanian period and is considered Late Pennsylvanian. The Pennsylvanian, also known as the Late Carboniferous, approximately covers the years 323.4 million years ago to 298.9 million years ago.

=== Upper Pennsylvania Cyclothems ===
Most strata in the Upper Pennsylvanian, including the Cherryvale, are cyclothems: Alternating stratigraphic sequences of marine and non-marine sediments. These different environments were created as sea levels rose and fell throughout this period, driven by changes in climate, growth and melting of ice sheets, and other variables. These areas were close to the ancient seashore, so as sea levels rose and fell, they transitioned from coastal land to seashore to shallow water to deep water, and then back.

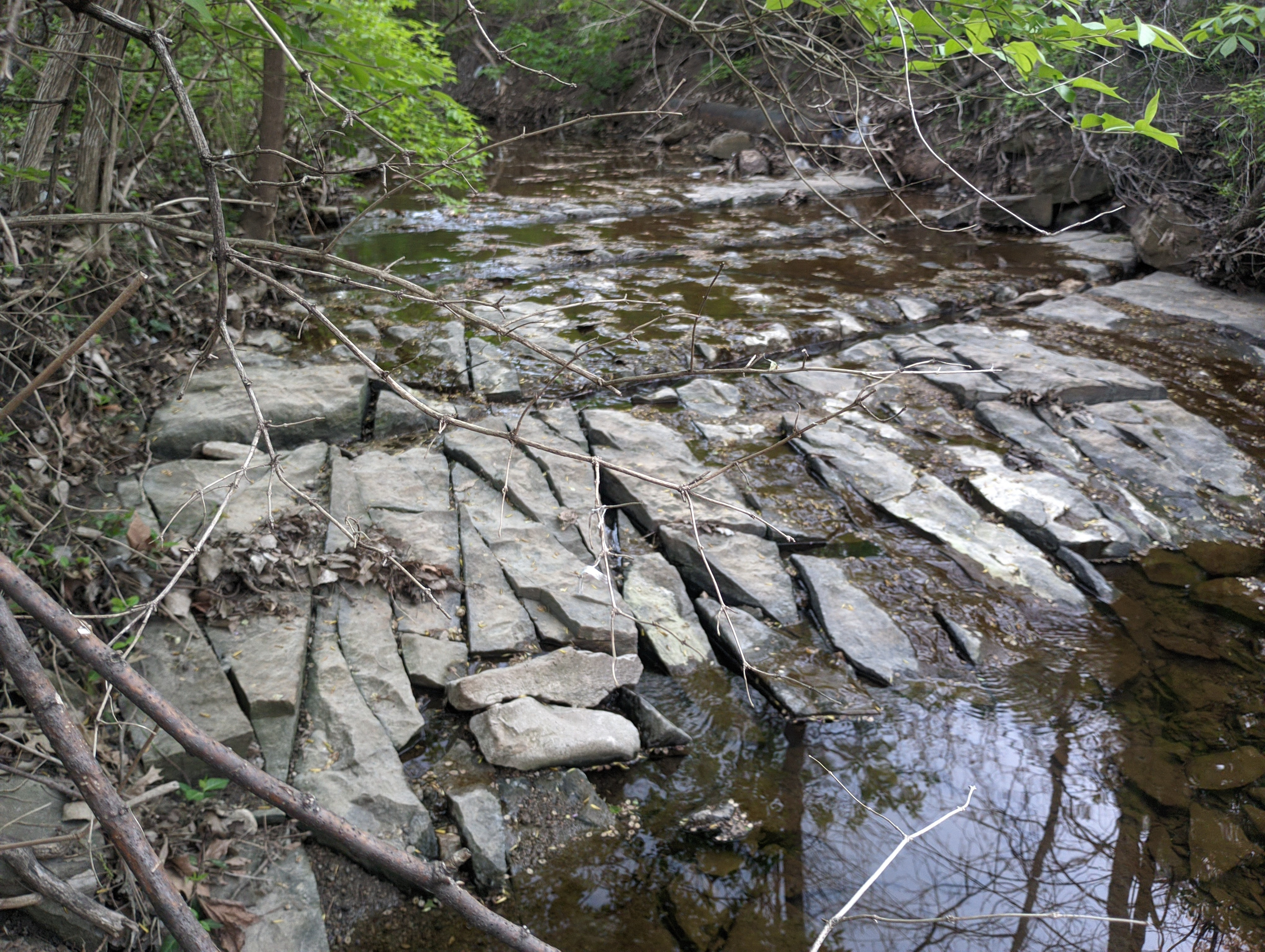
Block Limestone is typically a relatively thin, fine-grained well consolidated limestone in a single even bed, or parted by the occasional thin shale later as observed here. It is the "Middle Limestone" of a cylothem, created in moderately deep seas while seawater was quickly rising. The slabs are 6-8 inches thick. (Round Grove Creek, Raytown, Missouri.)

The result was an alternating series of shales and limestones shale produced both during coastal and deep water periods, and limestone during shallow water periods.

Sandstone and siltstone, typically in lenticular formations, is often produced in a river or stream delta area along the seashore. Pockets of coal where typically produced in marshy areas along the shoreline.

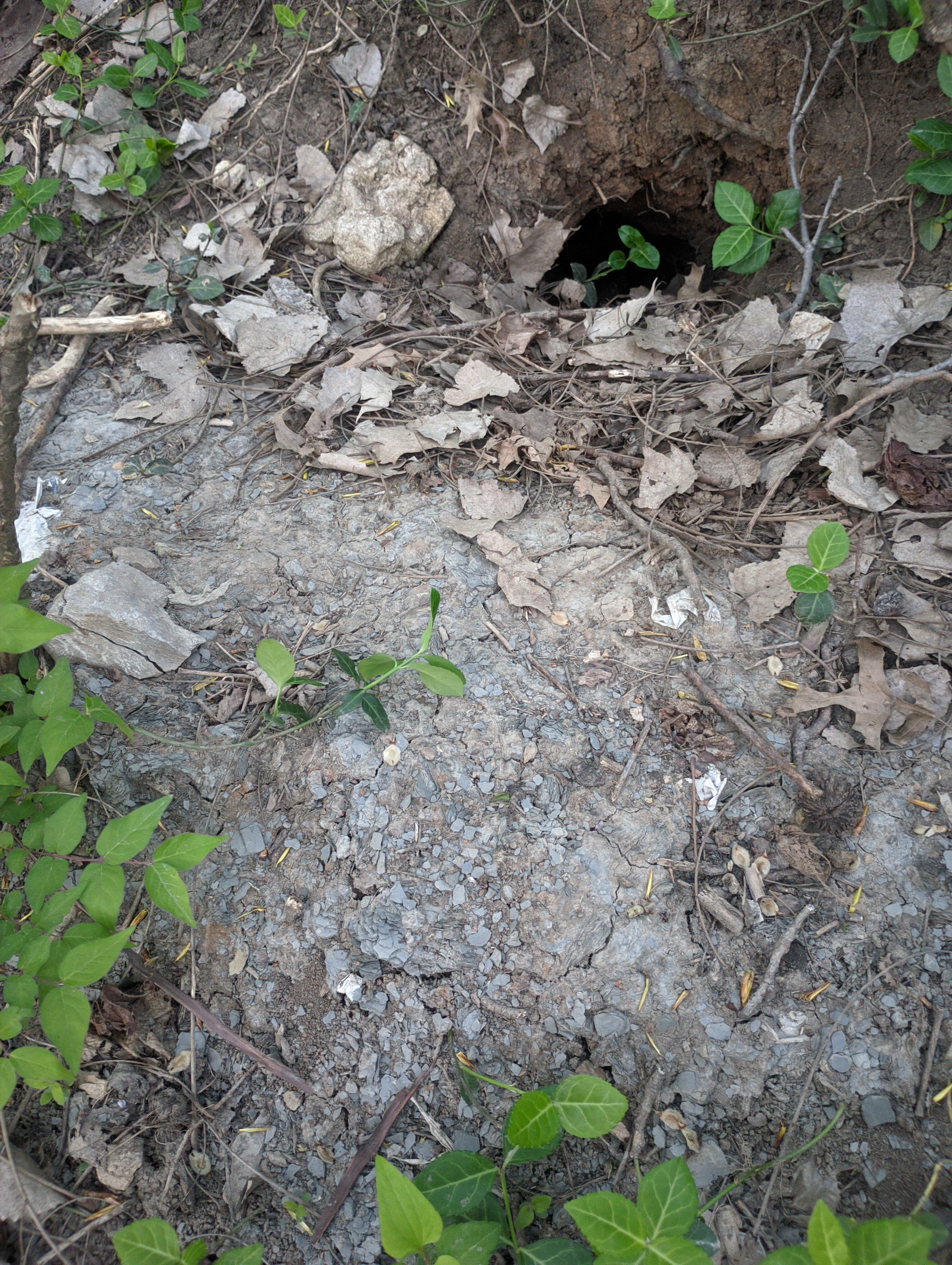
This mound of gray Wea Shale was excavated by a burrowing rodent, about 6 feet above the level of Block Limestone. Wea Shale represents the "Core Shale" of the cylothem, laid down in deep marine waters.

The exact details of each cyclothem in a given location depend on its relation to the sea level - those at lower depth may never, or only briefly, experience nonmarine environments while those at higher elevations may experience more periods of time on dry land, coastal, and very shallow water depths.

The strata of the Cherryvale Formation comprise one complete Cyclothem, from lowest to highest strata: Outside Shale (non-marine & near shore; Fontana Shale), Middle Limestone (moderate depth marine; Block Limestone), Core Shale (deep marine; Wea Shale), Upper Limestone (moderate depth marine; Westerville Limestone), and a second Outside Shale (non-marine & near shore; Quivira Shale) bookending the cyclothem.

=== Fontana Shale Member ===
The lowermost member of the Cherryvale is generally medium- to dark-gray or greenish-gray argillaceous shale that weathers light olive gray to yellowish gray. It is slightly calcareous and locally contains calcareous nodules . . . Fossils are generally sparse, but near the top of the member the brachiopod Chonetina flemingi occurs in abundance.

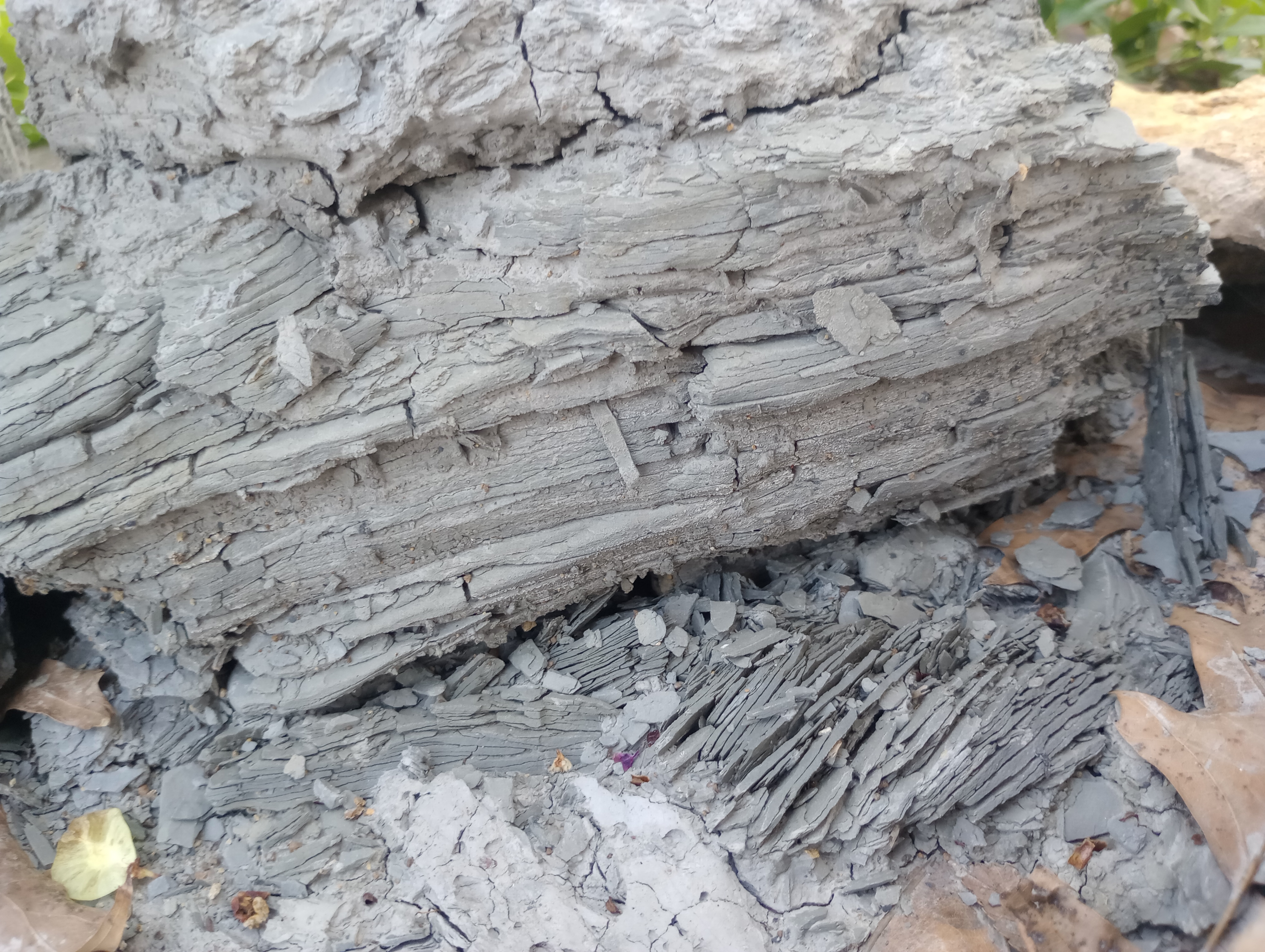
Wea Shale is gray shale above Block Limestone and below Westerville Limestone. This sample was found just below Westerville Limestone. It was created in a deep marine environment. Note the thin flakes.

=== Block Limestone Member ===
The Block is fine-grained gray to bluish-gray limestone that weathers yellowish gray to olive gray. On the surface, it is observed as a single even bed of limestone 0.5 foot thick to 0.8 foot thick. In subsurface formations as observed in well drilling it may be thicker and composed of two or more limestone beds separated a thin shale layer.

It is typically broken into blocks by vertical joints at near 90 degrees to each other, typically striking roughly NE and NW. Its name location is the village of Block, Kansas (named after John Block, an early settler - the fact the Block Limestone also tends to fracture into neat blocks is something of a coincidence).

This limestone is quite fossiliferous, with brachiopods, crinoids, and fusulinids commonly seen. The lowest portion has many Chonetina flemingi , a type of Brachiopod (marine animals with upper and lower valved shells).

As typical with the Middle Limestone strata of a cyclothem, this limestone is fairly thin and even bedded. This represents the relatively fast rise of sea levels as ice sheets melt. The higher Upper Limestone member (Westerville Limestone, in this case) is far thicker, and more diverse in character, because the lowering of sea levels as ice sheets gradually reform is far slower.

=== Wea Shale Member ===
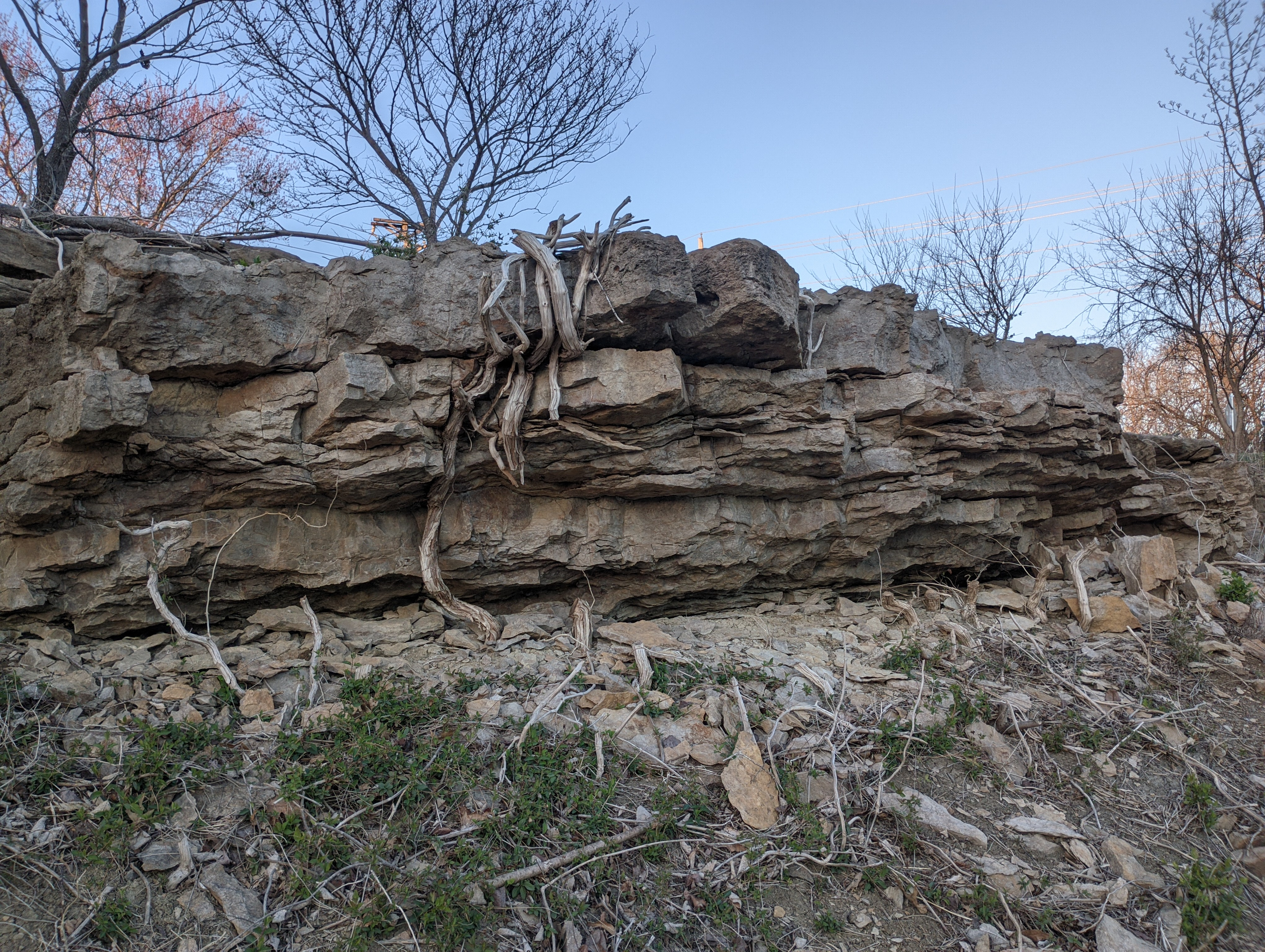
Outcrop of Westerville Limestone, Cherryvale Formation, Lower Linn Subgroup, Kansas City Group. The limestone overlays much softer Wea Shale, which quickly erodes leaving a characteristic overhang. Raytown, Missouri.

The Wea is commonly the thickest member of the Cherryvale Shale, ranging from 7 to 35 feet. It is typically a medium-gray to dark-greenish-gray shale with high clay content. Sandstone formations may replace all or parts of the Wea and Block members in some areas, perhaps representing delta or other outwash areas.

=== Westerville Limestone Member ===
Surface outcrops of Westerville Limestone vary from 4 to 19 feet, while subsurface deposits range from 0 to 30 feet in depth. Typically the lower 3.5 to 6 feet is thick even beds of limestone, with a few feet of interbedded limestone and shale above them.

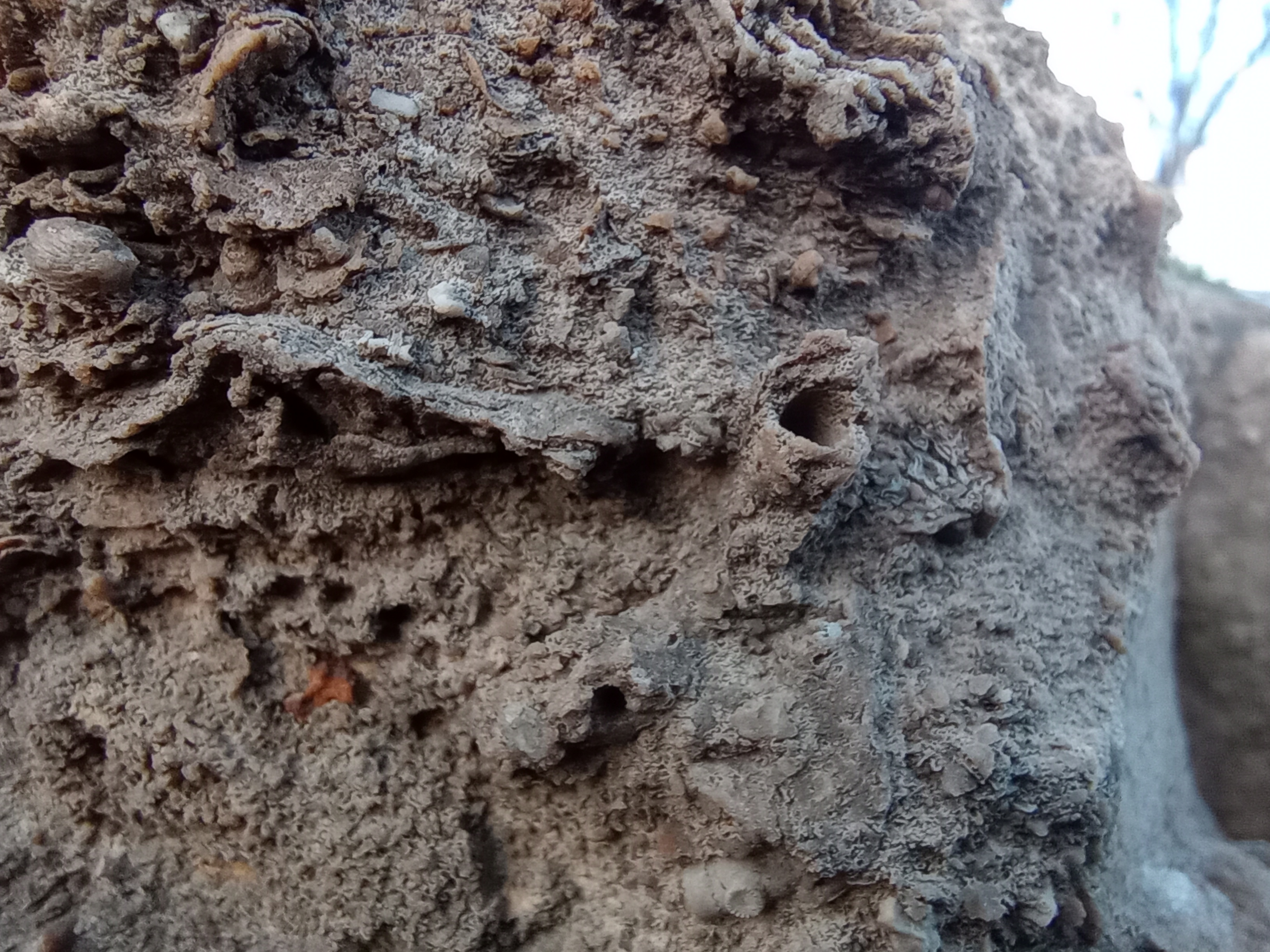
Fossils in the upper portion of an outcrop of Westerville Limestone, Cherryvale Formation, Lower Linn Subgroup, Kansas City Group. Raytown, MO.

The lower bed "was referred to by local stone masons as the 'Bull Ledge' because it was difficult to work".

In certain parts of the Kansas City metro area, this base is overlain by a thick "reef" of crossbedded oolitic limestone, which can be up to 12-16 feet thick, known as a "carbonate build-up". These oolitic reefs may have formed as actual near-shore ocean reefs standing above the surrounding seafloor in the ancient seas.

This light gray oolitic limestone contains a large amount and large variety of invertebrate fauna. One researcher collected over 100 species of invertebrates. Examples of the nautiloid cephalopod Domatoceras over 1 foot in diameter are common, as are specimens of the trilobite Ameura missouriensis.

These oolitic Westerville Limestone deposits occur in only a few specific areas of around the Kansas City area. The largest deposit, and a still-existing quarry, is near the intersection of I-435 and 350 Hwy west of Raytown.

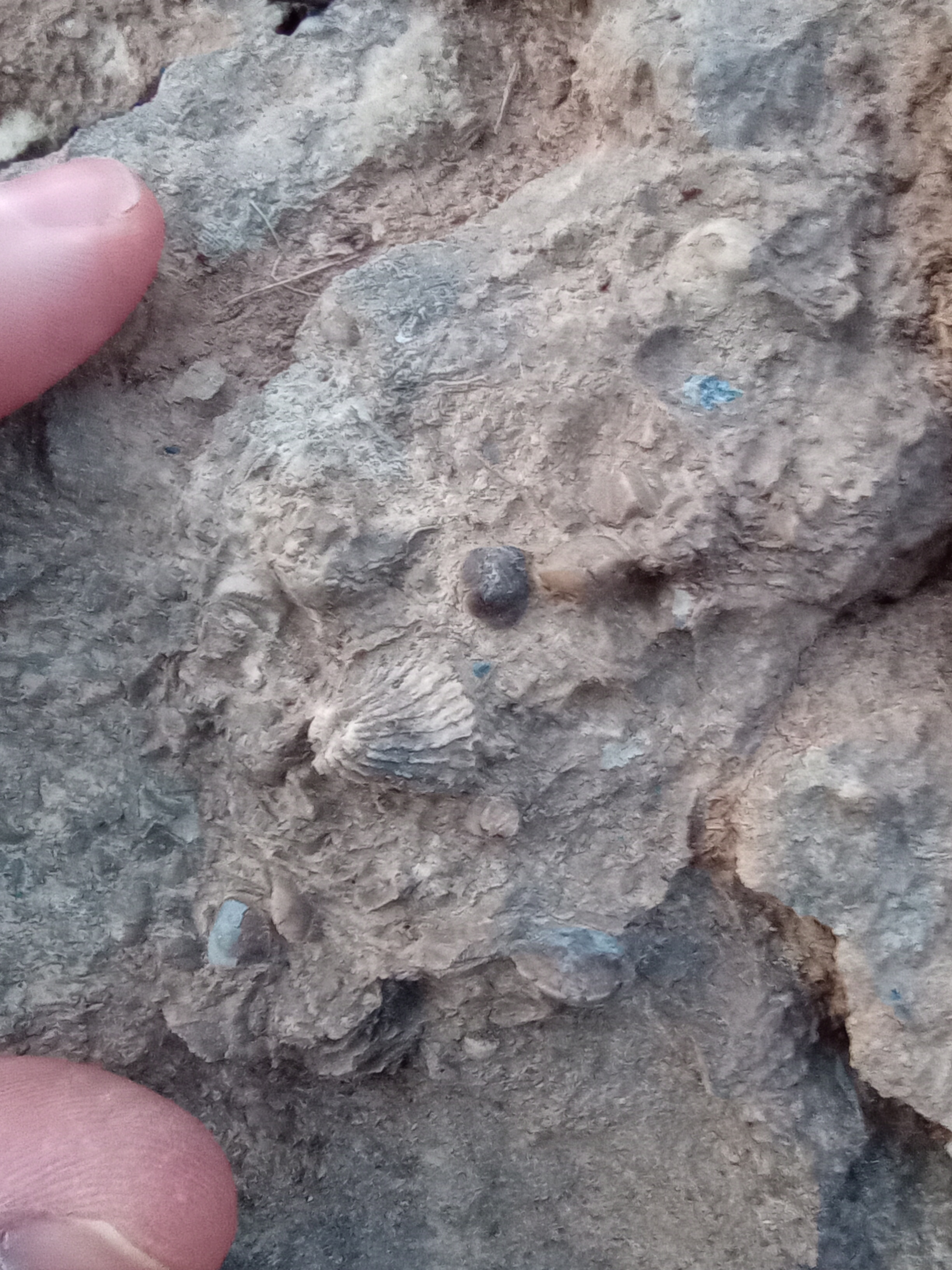
A variety of invertebrate fossils in Westerville Limestone, Cherryvale Formation, Lower Linn Subgroup, Kansas City Group. The formation contains "numerous crinoid, bryozoan, mollusk, and brachiopod remains." Raytown, Missouri.

Known commercially as "Kansas City Oolite", this limestone was extensively used as a building material, for example, for many buildings at the University of Missouri - Kansas City campus.

Note that the Westerville has previously been identified with the Drum Limestone of southeastern Kansas, which lies near this same stratum. However, the Drum Limestone more properly correlates with the Cement City Limestone of the overlying Dewey Formation.

=== Nellie Bly Formation ===
In some locations, the Nelly Bly Formation lies above the Westerville Limestone. It consists of "4 to 10 ft of gray shale with a thin discontinuous coal bed or plant fossil zone underlain by nodules of limestone in gray clay matrix" with sparse sandstone layers in the lower part.

This generally represents a non-marine or seashore near-marine area, with sandstone laid down by stream or river deposits, coal formed in swampy areas and from plant fossils indicating land or tidal areas.

This is considered a separate formation lying above the Cherryvale Formation. Together the Cherryvale and Nellie Bly Formations comprise the Lower Linn Subgroup of the Kansas City Group.

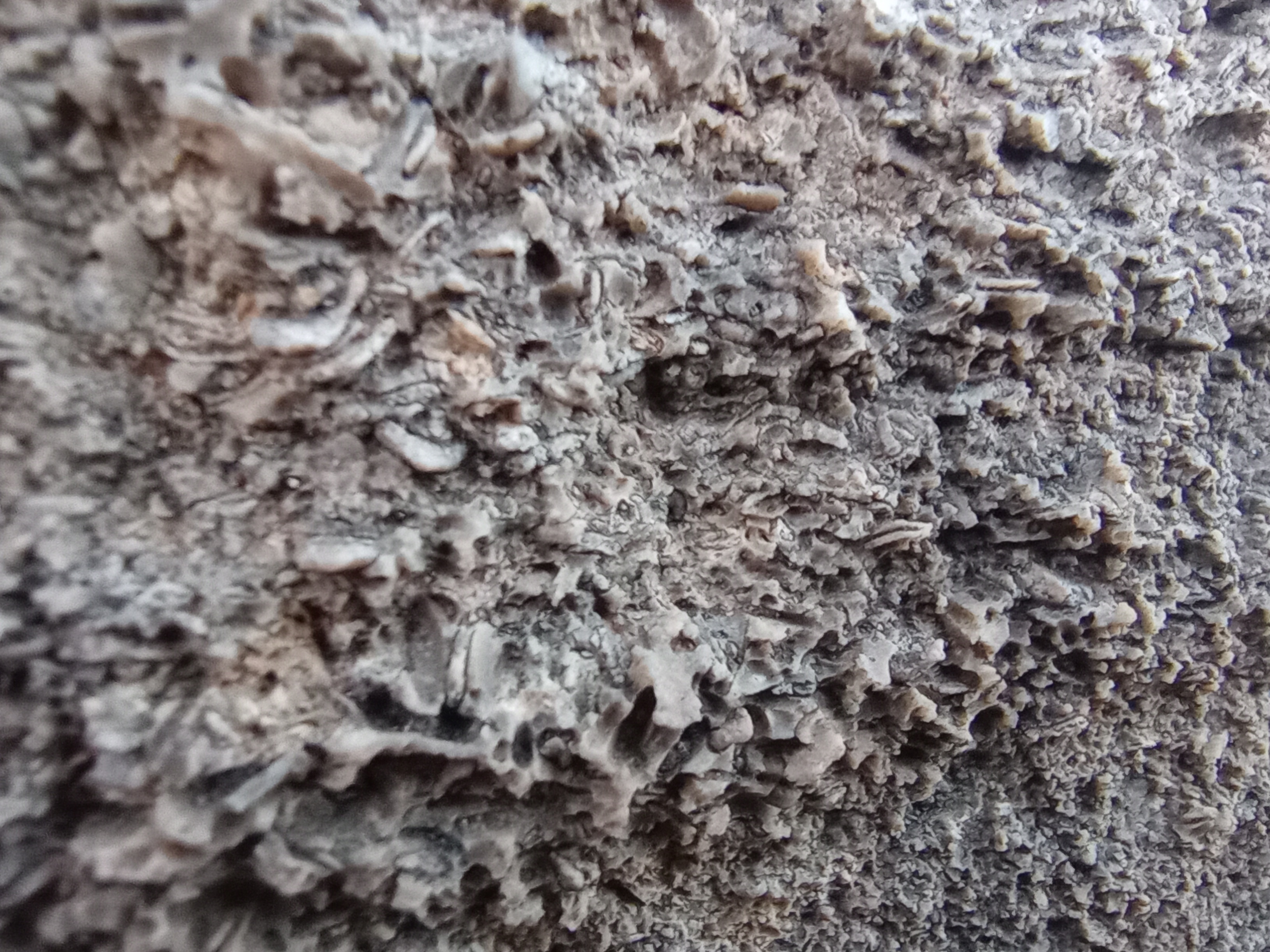
Thick bed of invertebrate fossils in Westerville Limestone, Cherryvale Formation, Lower Linn Subgroup, Kansas City Group. Raytown, Missouri.

=== Dewey Formation - Quivira Shale Member ===
Previously the Quivira Shale had been considered part of the Cherryvale Shale/Cherryvale Formation, and is so listed in many older references. However, it is now considered part of the overlying Dewey Formation.

The Quivira Shale is named after the Quivira Lake Resort near Holliday, Kansas.

In most exposures the Quivira ranges from 2 to 11 feet in thickness. Commonly the Quivira is thin at localities of thick Westerville . . . In nearly all exposures the Quivira consists of three lithologic units. The lower pad is grayish-green or greenish-gray argillaceous shale that contains a few mollusks and, in some exposures, an impure, soft, limy or calcareous zone. The middle unit is dark-gray to grayish-black fissile bituminous shale containing sparse Orbiculoidea. The dark shale commonly is 0.3 to 1.0 foot thick, but locally may be absent. The upper unit of Quivira is green shale and claystone, predominantly argillaceous, but locally calcareous enough to be quite hard.

== See also ==
- List of fossiliferous stratigraphic units in Missouri
- Paleontology in Missouri
