= McAlester Formation =

Geologic formation in Arkansas and Oklahoma, United States

- Stratigraphic range: Pennsylvanian
- Type: Formation
- Unit of: none
- Sub-units: Lower and Upper Hartshorne coal beds, and the McAlester coal bed
- Underlies: Savanna Formation
- Overlies: Hartshorne Sandstone
- Thickness: 500 to 2,300 feet

Lithology
- Primary: Shale

Location
- Region: Arkansas, Oklahoma
- Country: United States

Type section
- Named by: J.A. Taff

The McAlester Formation is a Pennsylvanian geologic formation in the Ouachita Mountains of Arkansas and Oklahoma. Early descriptions of this unit considered it to be part of the Coal Measures, part of the Upper or Western Coal Bearing Division, the Spadra Stage and part of the Sebastian Stage, and part of the Cavaniol Group. In 1899, J.A. Taff introduced the McAlester Formation name in his study of the Ouachita Mountains of Oklahoma. The name was introduced into Arkansas in 1907 as the McAlester Group, where it consisted of the formations known as the Spadra Shale, the Fort Smith Formation, and the Paris Shale. These formations was redefined and replaced in 1960, when the McAlester Shale replaced the Spadra Shale and the lower Fort Smith Formation. The McAlester Formation is informally recognized with three sub-units in Arkansas: the Lower and Upper Hartshorne coal beds, and the McAlester coal bed. Taff assigned the type locality near the town of McAlester in Pittsburg County, Oklahoma, however he did not state whether the town is the origin of the name. Taff did not designate a stratotype and, as of 2017, a reference section for the McAlester Formation has not been designated.

== See also ==
- List of fossiliferous stratigraphic units in Arkansas
- Paleontology in Arkansas
