= Savanna Sandstone =

Geologic formation in Arkansas and Oklahoma

Savanna Formation
- Stratigraphic range: Pennsylvanian
- Type: Formation
- Unit of: none
- Underlies: Boggy Formation
- Overlies: McAlester Formation
- Thickness: 1600 feet

Location
- Region: Arkansas, Oklahoma
- Country: United States

Type section
- Named by: J.A. Taff

The Savanna Sandstone or Savanna Formation is a Pennsylvanian geologic formation in the Ouachita Mountains of Arkansas and Oklahoma. Early descriptions of this unit have considered it to be part of the Coal Measures, part of the Upper or Western Coal Bearing Division, part of the Sebastian Stage, and part of the Cavaniol Group. In 1899, J.A. Taff introduced the Savanna Formation name in his study of the Ouachita Mountains of Oklahoma. The name was introduced into Arkansas in 1907, although in 1950, the interval was renamed the Boggy Formation, while the name "Savanna Formation" replaced the underlying interval consisting of the upper Fort Smith Formation and the lower Paris Shale (both names are now abandoned). The Savanna Formation is informally recognized with two named sub-units in Arkansas: the Charleston and Paris coal beds. Taff assigned the type area to the towns of McAlester and Savanna in Pittsburg County, Oklahoma, however he did not state whether the town of Savanna is the origin of the name. Taff did not designate a stratotype, however, a reference section was designated in 1995 in Pittsburg County, Oklahoma.

== See also ==
- List of fossiliferous stratigraphic units in Arkansas
- Paleontology in Arkansas
