= Dewey Formation =

Geologic formation in Iowa and Oklahoma, USA

- Stratigraphic range: Carboniferous
- Type: Formation

Lithology
- Primary: Limestone

Location
- Region: Iowa, Oklahoma
- Country: United States

Type section
- Named for: Dewey, Washington County, Oklahoma
- Named by: D. W. Ohern, 1910

The Dewey Formation is a geologic formation in Iowa and Oklahoma. It preserves fossils dating back to the Carboniferous period.

== See also ==
- List of fossiliferous stratigraphic units in Iowa
- Paleontology in Iowa
