= Lansing Group =

Fossiliferous geologic group in northern Midwest USA

- Stratigraphic range: Carboniferous
- Type: Group

Location
- Region: Nebraska, Iowa, Missouri and Kansas
- Country: United States

The Lansing Group is a geologic group in Nebraska, Iowa, Missouri and Kansas. It preserves fossils dating back to the Carboniferous period.

== See also ==
- List of fossiliferous stratigraphic units in Nebraska
- Paleontology in Nebraska
