= List of fossiliferous stratigraphic units in Missouri =

This article contains a list of fossil-bearing stratigraphic units in the state of Missouri, U.S.

== Sites ==
Group or Formation	Period	Notes
Altamont Formation	Carboniferous	
Aux Vases Sandstone	Mississippian	
Bainbridge Limestone	Silurian	
Bainbridge Group/Moccasin Springs Formation	Silurian	
Bonneterre Formation	Cambrian	
Bowling Green Dolomite	Silurian	
Bronson Group/Hertha Formation	Carboniferous	
Bryant Knob Formation	Silurian, Ordovician	
Burgner Formation	Carboniferous	
Burlington Limestone	Carboniferous	
Calcarenite Facies	Cambrian	
Callaway Limestone	Devonian	
Cape Limestone	Ordovician	
Carterville Formation	Carboniferous	
Cedar Valley Group/Little Cedar Formation	Devonian	
Chanute Formation	Carboniferous	
Chemung Formation	Devonian	
Cherokee Shale	Carboniferous	
Cherokee Group/Cabaniss Formation	Carboniferous	
Cherokee Group/Drywood Formation	Carboniferous	
Cherokee Group/Krebs Formation	Carboniferous	
Cherokee Group/Riverton Formation	Carboniferous	
Cherokee Group/Riverton Formation	Carboniferous	
Chouteau Formation	Carboniferous	
Chouteau Group	Carboniferous	
Compton Limestone	Mississippian	
Cotter Formation	Ordovician	
Davis Formation	Cambrian	
Decorah Shale	Ordovician	
Dennis Formation	Carboniferous	
Derby-Doerun Dolomite	Cambrian	
Dunleith Formation	Ordovician	
Dutchtown Formation	Ordovician	
Elsey Formation	Mississippian	
Elvins Group	Cambrian	
Eminence Formation	Cambrian	
Fern Glen Formation	Mississippian	
Fort Scott Limestone	Carboniferous	
Gasconade Formation	Ordovician	
Glen Park Formation	Carboniferous	
Gulf Group/Ripley Formation	Cretaceous	
Hannibal Shale	Carboniferous	
Hertha Formation	Carboniferous	
Jefferson City Formation	Ordovician	
Jordan Coal	Carboniferous	
Kansas City Group/Cherryville Shale	Carboniferous	
Kansas City Group/Dennis Formation	Carboniferous	
Kansas City Group/Galesburg Shale	Carboniferous	
Kansas City Group/Hertha Formation	Carboniferous	
Kansas City Group/Iola Formation	Carboniferous	
Kansas City Group/Wyandotte Formation	Carboniferous	
Keokuk Limestone	Carboniferous	
Kimmswick Limestone	Ordovician	
Leemon Formation	Ordovician	
Lost Branch Formation	Carboniferous	
Louisiana Limestone	Devonian	
Maquoketa Group	Ordovician	
Marmaton Group/Appanoose Formation	Carboniferous	
Marmaton Group/Fort Scott Limestone	Carboniferous	
Marmaton Group/Pawnee Formation	Carboniferous	
Mineola Limestone	Devonian	
Noix Limestone	Ordovician	
Northview Formation	Mississippian	
Nowata Formation	Carboniferous	
Owl Creek Formation	Cretaceous	
Pierson Limestone	Mississippian	
Plattsburg Formation	Carboniferous	
Potosi Formation	Cambrian	
Powell Formation	Ordovician	
Reeds Spring Formation	Mississippian	
Rich Fountain Formation	Ordovician	
Roubidoux Formation	Ordovician	
Salem Limestone	Carboniferous	
Smithville Formation	Ordovician	
Snyder Creek Shale	Devonian	
Ste. Genevieve Limestone	Mississippian	
St. Joe Formation	Mississippian	
St. Laurent Formation	Devonian	
Sulphur Springs Group	Devonian	
Swope Formation	Carboniferous	
Theodosia Formation	Ordovician	
Verdigris Formation	Carboniferous	
Warsaw Formation	Carboniferous	

== See also ==
- Paleontology in Missouri
