= Swope Formation =

Geologic formation in Missouri

- Stratigraphic range: Carboniferous
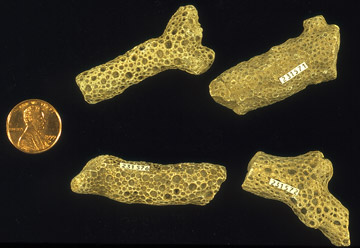
- Fossils from the Bethany Falls Limestone Member, Swope Limestone in Labette County, Kansas.
- Type: Formation
- Unit of: Lower Bronson Subgroup, Kansas City Group
- Sub-units: Elm Branch Formation (shale), Middle Creek Limestone, Hushpuckney Shale, Bethany Falls Limestone
- Underlies: Galesburg Formation (shale), Upper Bronson Subgroup
- Overlies: Hertha Formation, Lower Bronson Subgroup, Kansas City Group

Location
- Region: Missouri, Nebraska, Kansas, Iowa
- Country: United States

The Swope Formation is a geologic formation in Iowa, Kansas, Missouri and Nebraska. It preserves fossils dating back to the Carboniferous period.

The Swope Formation is a member of the Kansas City Group and comprises the majority of one complete cyclothem.

Kansas City Group Examples - Lowest to Highest Strata
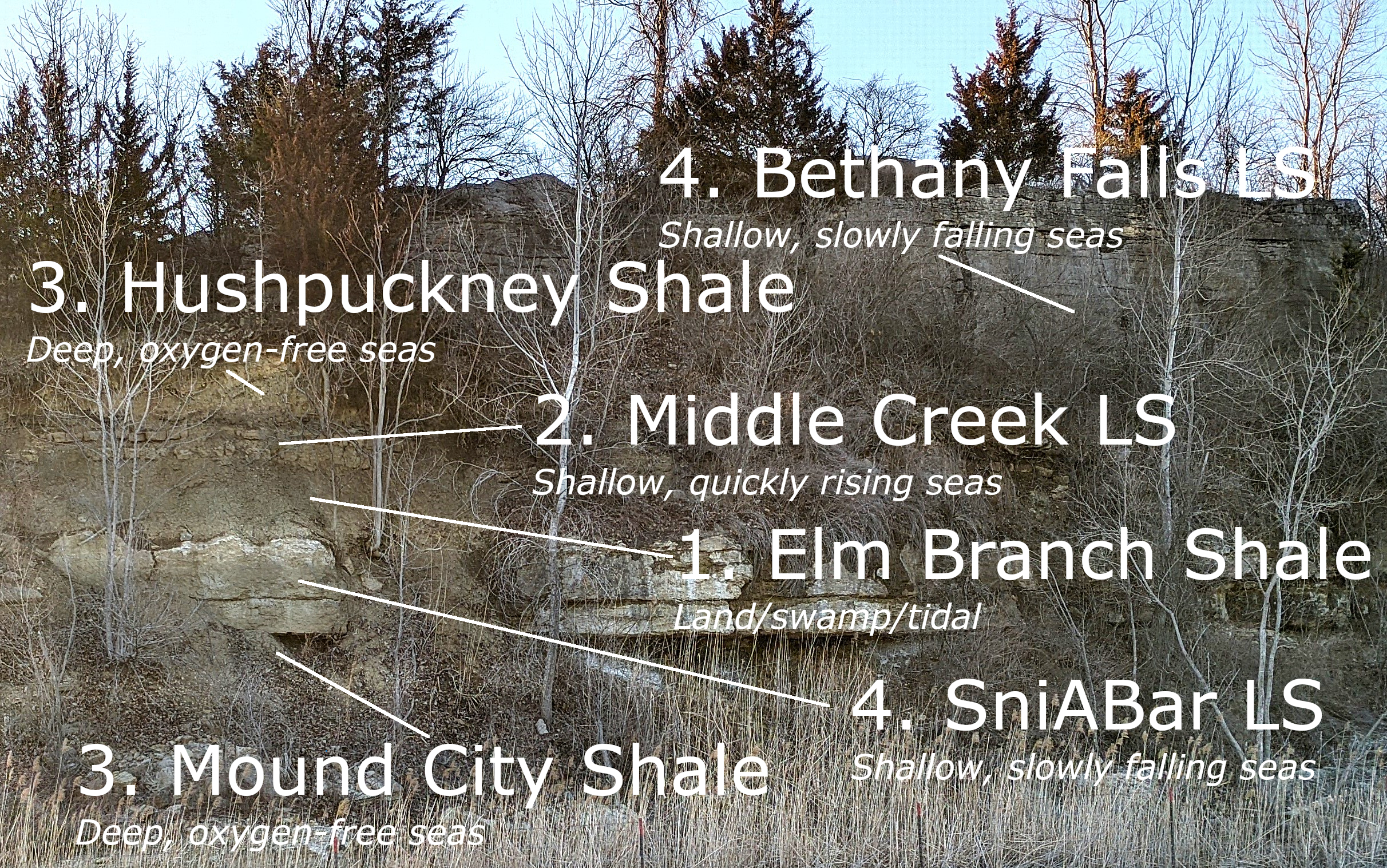
Outcrop showing Elm Branch Shale (lowest, undercut), Middle Creek Limestone, Hushpuckney Shale (slumping hillside), and Bethany Falls Limestone (highest cliff). Note soft, eroded shale undercutting Middle Creek Limestone and slumped slope representing Hushpuckney Shale, with little or no shale visible on the surface - both typical of shale members of the Kansas City Group in many outcrops and road cuts. Knobtown, Missouri.

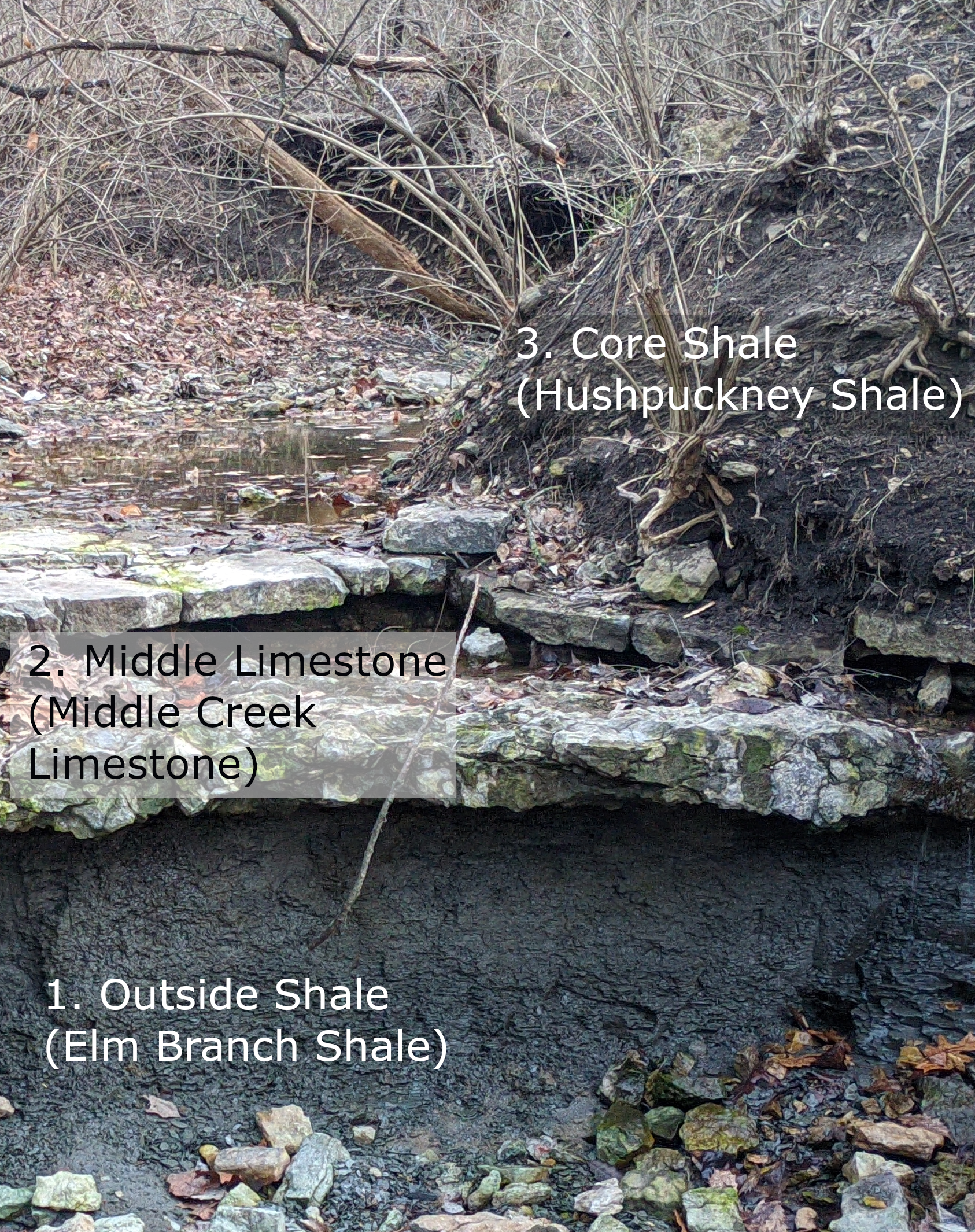
This image illustrates the first three stages of a typical cyclothem as found in eastern Kansas and western Missouri. **Stage 1, Outside Shale (non-marine). **Stage 2, Middle Limestone (fast-rising seawater). **Stage 3, Core Shale (deep seawater). **In situ, shale layers are often seen as slumping hillside. As the Hushpuckney Shale layer in this photo, the shale is covered with soil and not seen. **Middle Limestone often has beds separated by a thin shale layer - as we see here with the Middle Creek Limestone's two relatively thin beds of limestone separated by a very thin layer of shale. The two limestone beds range from 0.5 to 1.5 ft in thickness, and the thin shale layer is just a fraction of an inch. Here, you see the effects of water erosion on the two separated layers of limestone. (Bed of Cedar Creek in Lees Summit, Missouri)
Kansas City Group

== See also ==
- How Bethany Falls Limestone Helped Build Kansas City at FlatlandKC.org
- Kansas City Group
- Cyclothems
- List of fossiliferous stratigraphic units in Missouri
- Paleontology in Missouri
