= Cherokee Group =

Geologic group in Missouri and Iowa, US

- Stratigraphic range: Pennsylvanian
- Type: Group
- Sub-units: Cabaniss and Krebs subgroups
- Underlies: Marmaton Group
- Overlies: Riverton Formation

Lithology
- Primary: Shale
- Other: Limestone, coal, sandstone

Location
- Region: Missouri, Iowa
- Country: United States

Type section
- Named for: Cherokee County of southeastern Kansas
- Named by: Haworth and Kirk (1894)

The Cherokee Group is a Pennsylvanian geologic group in Missouri and Iowa. The group contains most of the economic coal deposits of Missouri and Iowa.

== See also ==
- List of fossiliferous stratigraphic units in Missouri
- Paleontology in Missouri
