= Galesburg Shale =

Geologic formation in Missouri

- Stratigraphic range: Carboniferous
- Type: Formation
- Unit of: Kansas City Group

Location
- Region: Missouri
- Country: United States

The Galesburg Shale is a geologic formation in Missouri. It preserves fossils dating back to the Carboniferous period.

== See also ==
- List of fossiliferous stratigraphic units in Missouri
- Paleontology in Missouri
