= Kansas City Group =

Geologic formation

- Stratigraphic range: Pennsylvanian
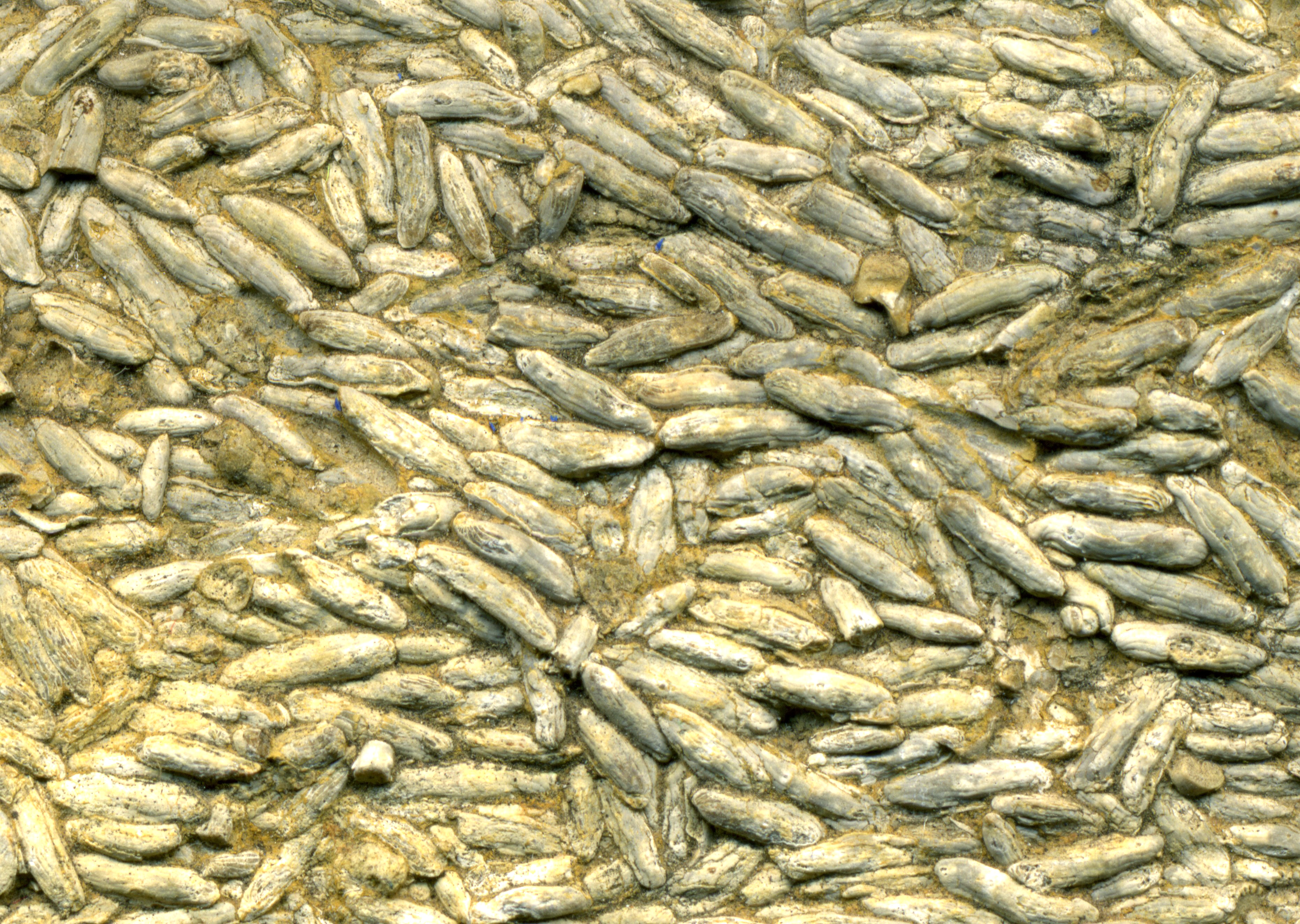
- Fossils from the Iola Formation, Kansas City Group
- Type: Group/Formation
- Unit of: Missourian Stage
- Sub-units: Kansas Classification: Bonner Springs Shale; Wyandotte Limestone; Lane Shale; Iola Limestone; Chanute Shale (sandy); Drum Limestone (cherty); Cherryvale Shale (cherty); Dennis Limestone (cherty); Galesburg Shale (sandy); Swope Limestone; Ladore Shale; Hertha Limestone
- Underlies: Lansing Group
- Overlies: Pleasanton Group

Lithology
- Primary: Cherty limestone, shale, sandstone
- Other: coal

Location
- Region: Midcontinent Seaway
- Country: United States

Type section
- Named for: Kansas City, Missouri
- Named by: J. A. Gallaher
- Year defined: 1898

The Kansas City Group is a geologic unit from the Late Carboniferous period, classified as a group in most regions but as a formation in some, such as Iowa. It is characterized by its significant alternating beds of limestone and shale, which form prominent bluffs in Missouri, Kansas, and neighboring states. This unit was named for the bluffs within Kansas City, Missouri. Primary outcrops are in northwest Missouri. The Kansas City Group has been a historic oil producing unit within Kansas and Missouri.

== General characterization and economic importance ==
Philip Heckel characterized the geology of eastern Kansas and western Missouri:

Bedrock geology of eastern Kansas is characterized by an alternation of laterally persistent Middle and Upper Pennsylvanian sandy shales from 3 to 30 m (9.8 to 98.4 ft) thick and containing local sandstones, with laterally persistent limestones from 3 to 15 m (9.8 to 49.2 ft) thick and containing thin shale beds. These rocks strike generally north-northeast to south-southwest . . . and dip gently westward about 30 ft/mi (5.7 m/km). South of the limit of thin glacial cover, the more resistant thicker limestone and sandstone units are cut by rivers and streams to form low, irregular, eastward-facing escarpments, prongs, and flat-topped hills that break the otherwise nearly flat plain and allow lateral tracing of major units with ease.

Richard Gentile adds:

Of most importance economically are the beds of limestone, in particular, the Bethany Falls Limestone. The industrial development of Kansas City is closely related to the exploitation of the 20–24 ft (6.1–7.3 m) thick "ledge" of Bethany Falls Limestone in quarrying and mining operations. . . . The Bethany Falls has been extensively quarried and mined throughout the Kansas City area since the 1880s. . . . [It is] informally called the "Bethany Ledge" by quarrymen. Almost all of the underground space left after mining operations in metropolitan Kansas City is in the Bethany Falls Limestone.

This underground space is extensively used throughout the Kansas City area, for example, in the 55,000,000-square-foot (5,100,000 m^{2}) SubTropolis underground business complex. It is the largest such underground complex in the United States - and just one of many such underground operations in the Kansas City metropolitan area.

== Geological time period and characteristics ==
The Kansas City Group is part of the Missourian Series, approximately 307 to 303.7 Ma. This equates to the Kasimovian Stage of the ICS geologic timescale. The Missourian Series is the third of four stages of the Pennsylvanian period and is considered Late Pennsylvanian. The Pennsylvanian, also known as the Late Carboniferous, approximately covers the years 323.4 million years ago to 298.9 million years ago. At this time, the area that is now the Kansas City Group was periodically covered in low-lying seas, along the seashore, or in wet and swampy areas along the seashore. As the climate changed over hundreds of thousands to millions of years, the varying sea levels created a fairly predictable sequence of strata that became the modern-day limestone, shale, and occasional sandstone formations. These alternating stratigraphic sequences of marine and non-marine sediments, sometimes interbedded with coal seams, formed as a result of marine regressions and transgressions related to growth and decay of ice sheets and other climate phenomena, are known as cyclothems. As common for strata in the Carboniferous period, the Kansas City Group held commercially exploitable reserves of oil that have been tapped in both Missouri and Kansas; coal has been mined in some locations.

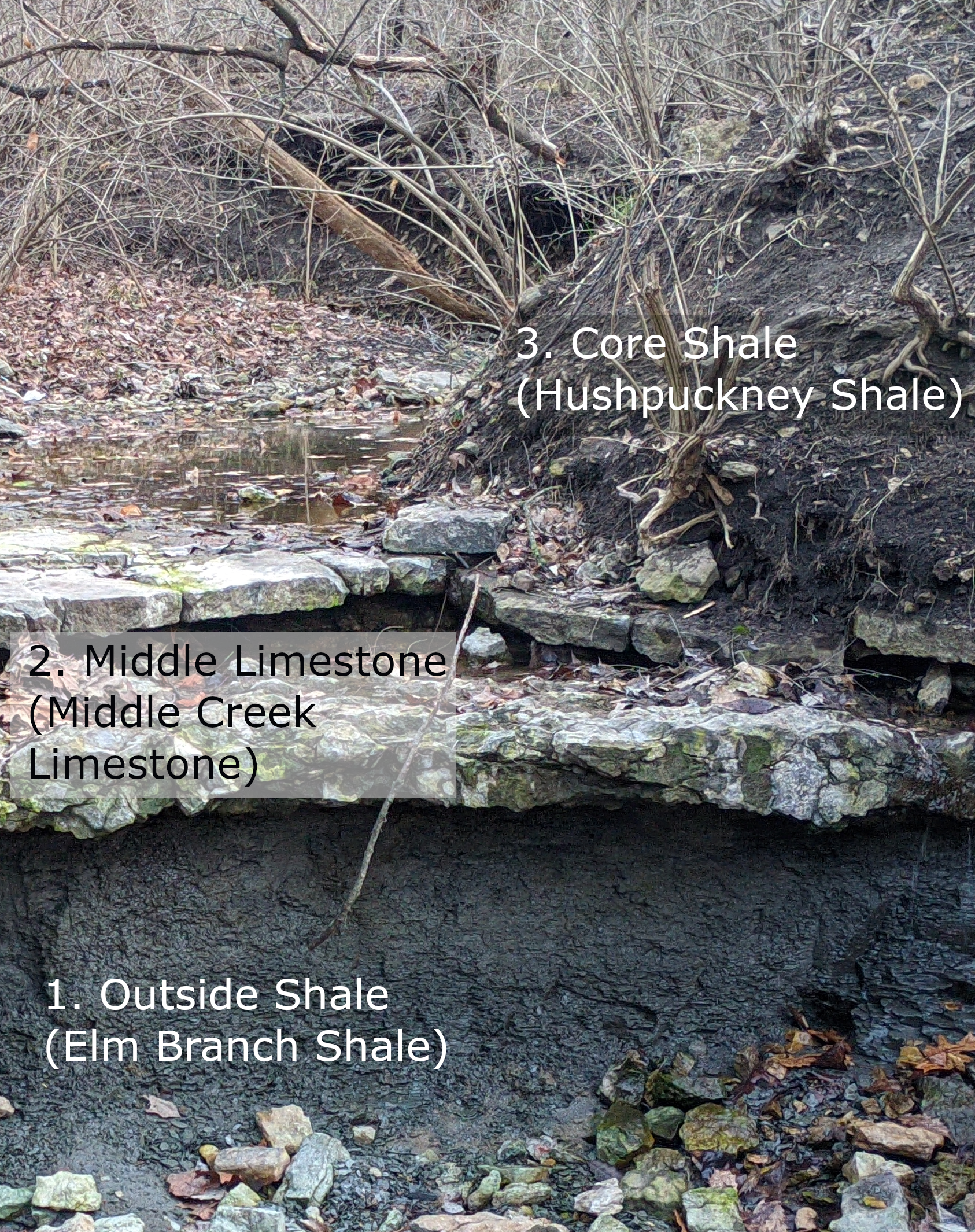
This image illustrates the first three stages of a typical cyclothem as found in eastern Kansas and western Missouri. * Stage 1, Outside Shale (non-marine). * Stage 2, Middle Limestone (fast-rising seawater). * Stage 3, Core Shale (deep seawater). In situ, shale layers are often seen as a slumping, vegetated hillside. As the Hushpuckney Shale layer in this photo, the shale is covered with soil and not seen. The Middle Limestone often has beds separated by a thin shale layer, as seen here with the Middle Creek Limestone's two relatively thin beds of limestone separated by a very thin layer of shale. The two limestone beds range from 0.5 to 1.5 ft (15 to 46 cm) in thickness, and the thin shale layer is just a fraction of an inch. Here, the effects of water erosion on the two separated layers of limestone are visible. (Bed of Cedar Creek in Lees Summit, Missouri)

== Upper Pennsylvanian cyclothems ==
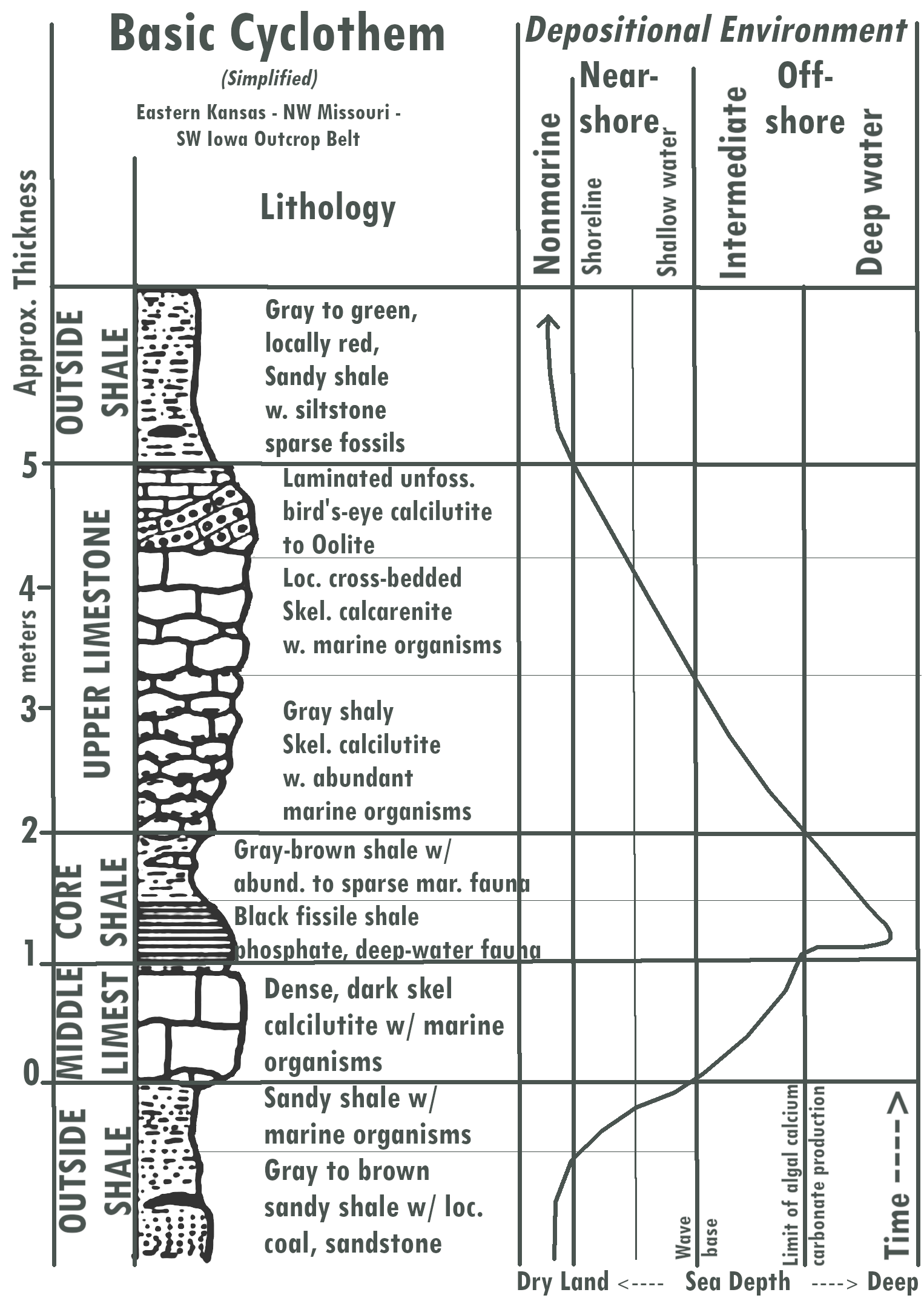
Simplified outline of a basic cyclothem as found in the geology of eastern Kansas, northwest Missouri, and southwest Iowa. This diagram is based on figure 4 from "Field Guide to Upper Pennsylvanian Cyclothetic Limestone Facies in Eastern Kansas".

The cyclothems in the Kansas City Group are fairly predictable, repeating layers of limestone-shale-limestone-shale created as the sea level rose and fell:

1. Outside Shale. At the lowest sea level, the area was a non-marine environment adjacent to the nearby sea. The area may have been low-lying and swampy, receiving outflows of detritus and, sometimes, sand from streams and downwash from adjacent land. The result is a gray to brown sandy shale with local coal and sandstone deposits. As the sea level begins to rise slightly, this turns to sandy shale with marine biota.
2. Middle Limestone. Sea levels begin to rise, typically due to melting of ice sheets. Because the melting process and resulting rise in sea level is typically quite fast-moving, this phase is shorter than the later regressive phase of the sea levels and thus creates a thinner, denser, and more uniform limestone layer. This phase begins when the sea level is deep enough that the layer was below the wave base, allowing calcium carbonate deposits to accumulate steadily, undisturbed by wave action. Invertebrate marine fossils are present as are preserved algae, the primary biological driver of the calcium carbonate deposits. Thin layers of shale between thicker section of limestone are often present, and may represent a layer of detritus from flooding or some other major outflow event or some other relatively brief change in conditions.
3. Core Shale. As the sea level continues to rise, the sea depth reaches a limit beyond which the algae can no longer create calcium carbonate. Accumulation of calcium carbonate, and thus limestone, ends. The deep-water conditions create a thin, gray layer of marine shale, typically 0.3 to 2 m (0.98 to 6.56 ft) thick, lacking sand and holding only fossils of organisms known to frequent deep water areas. These layers were created by very slow process of sedimentation in deep water under anoxic (very low oxygen) conditions. The deposits are rich in heavy metals and phosphate, which was created by the slow decay of immense blooms of plankton, which slowly settled to the sea floor.

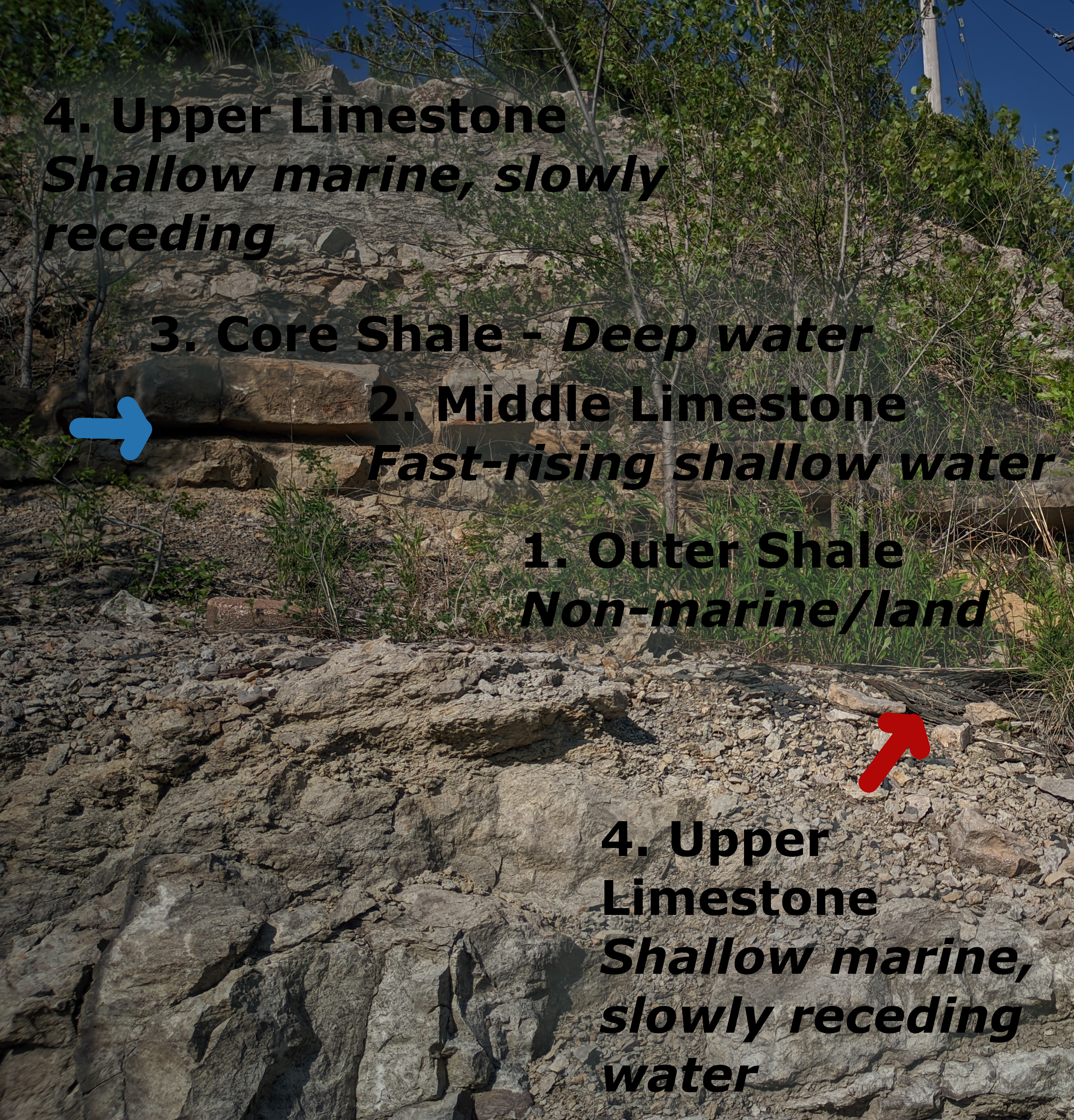
Cliffside exposure of the Kansas City Group showing a full cyclothem from Upper Limestone through Outer Shale, Middle Limestone, Core Shale, and back to Upper Limestone. The red arrow indicates chunks of thin-layered, dark-gray shale that have fallen from the Elm Branch/Ladore Shale layer above. The blue arrow indicates the two relatively thin sections of Middle Creek Limestone parted by a very thin shale layer, seen as a narrow crack. This is at the Blue River in Kansas City, Missouri.

1. Upper Limestone. As ice sheets slowly grow again, the sea levels slowly decline. As soon as sea depth in this area becomes shallow enough that algae can once again resume the production of calcium carbonate, the accumulation of limestone formations begins again. Because the decline in sea levels is far slower than the rise was, typically taking around three times as long, this layer of limestone is far thicker and also, typically, more varied than was the Middle Limestone. This layer can be 3–9 m (9.8–29.5 ft) in thickness. Again, preserved algae, marine invertebrates, and conodonts such as Ozarkodina, eel-like marine creatures lacking jaws but with numerous sharp teeth, are present. The lower part of this limestone typically consists of wavy-bedded limestone with a large number of fossils of many marine species. Thin layers of shale often separate the wavy-bedded limestone layers. The upper section of the Upper Limestone formation is often more varied from place to place, representing the disproportionate effect minor differences in topography can have in shallow waters, and in some cases reefs or shoals that accumulated atop the other layers. The limestone created under shallower seas reflects the greater agitation due to wave action and penetration of light expected at those shallower depths.
2. Outside Shale again. As sea levels continue to decrease, we finally reach the stage where shale accumulates in very shallow seas, along the seashore, and then in drier areas just above sea level, as in the beginning (Stage 1). Some areas were ancient stream or river deltas, with deposits of material weathered from rocks in present-day Oklahoma. In these areas we may see shale deposits interspersed with lenses of sandstone, siltstone, or other sedimentary rock. And, again, we may find local coal deposits created in more substantial swamps or marshy areas.

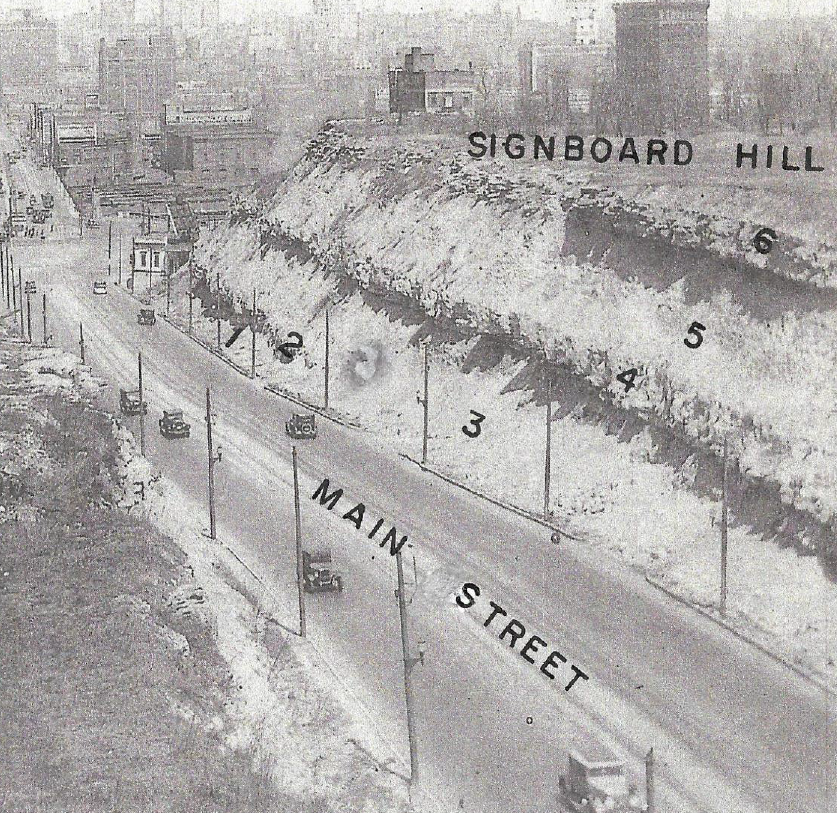
This 1929 view of Signboard Hill, Main Street, Kansas City, shows more than two and a half cyclothems in the geological strata of the Kansas City Group.: 1. Wea Shale (Core Shale); 2. Cement City Limestone (Upper Limestone); 3. Chanute Shale (Outer Shale); 4. Iola Group (thin layers of Paola Limestone [Middle LS] and Muncie Creek Shale [Core Shale] below thicker Raytown Sandstone [Upper LS]); 5. Liberty Memorial Shale (Outer Shale); 6. Wyandotte Formation (thin layers of Frisbie Limestone [Middle LS] and Quindaro Shale [Core Shale] below much thicker Argentine Limestone [Upper LS])

=== Gallery ===
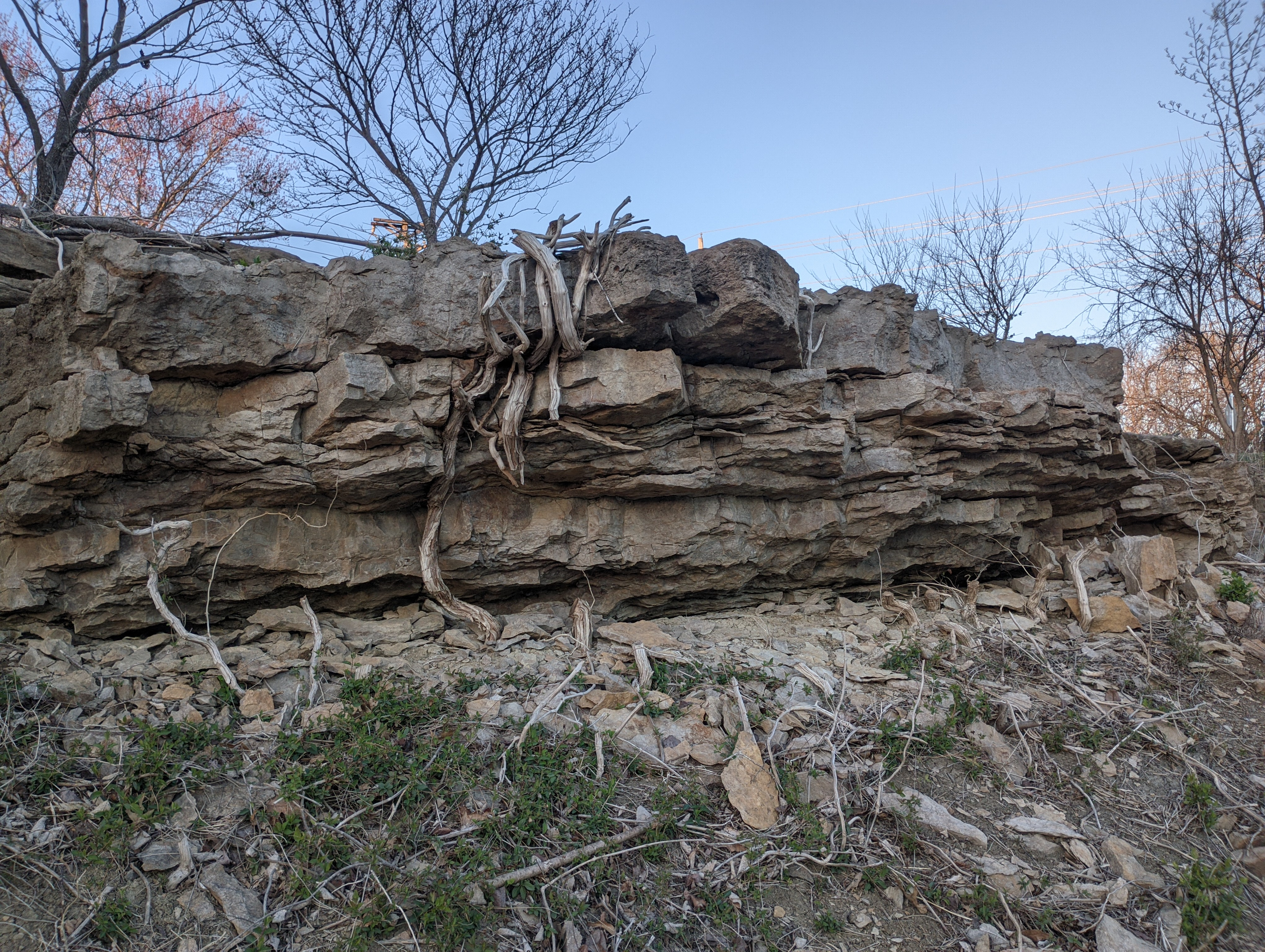
Westerville Limestone shows a characteristic overhang where the softer Wea Shale below has eroded, a common feature in the group.

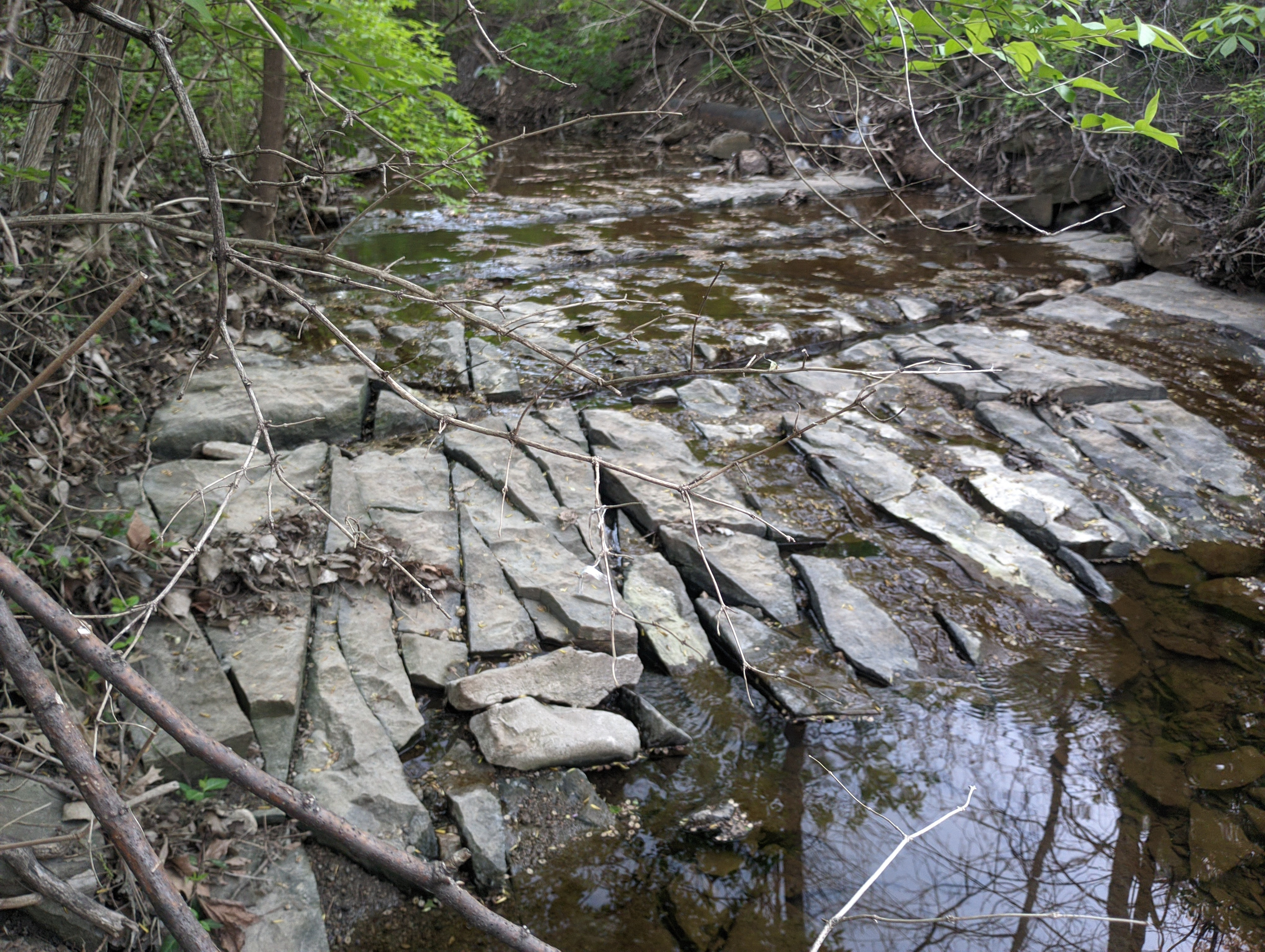
Block Limestone, which fractures into distinct rectangular blocks, represents the "Middle Limestone" phase of a cyclothem.

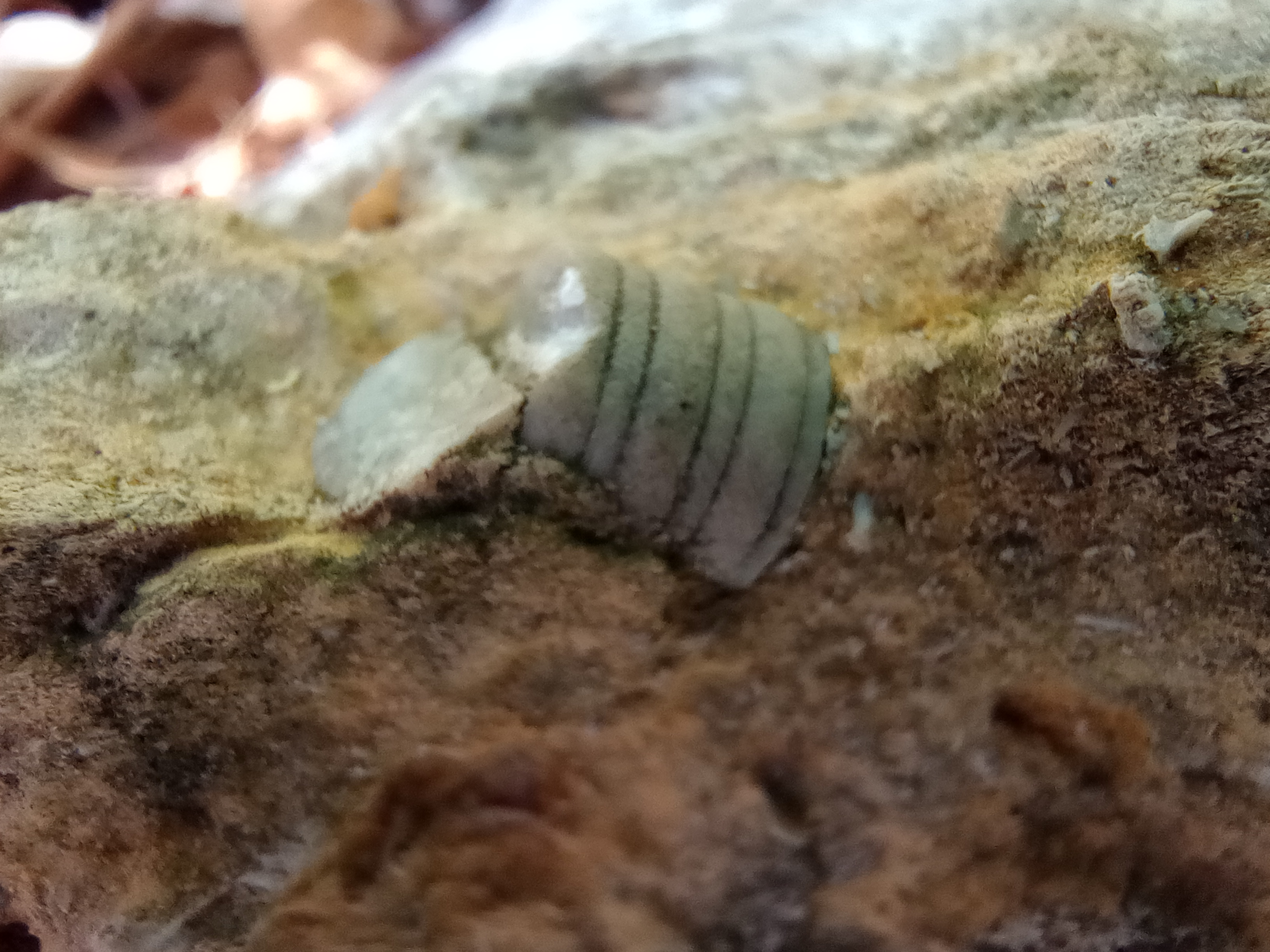
A Crinoid fossil in Westerville Limestone. Fossils of marine invertebrates are common in the group's limestone members.

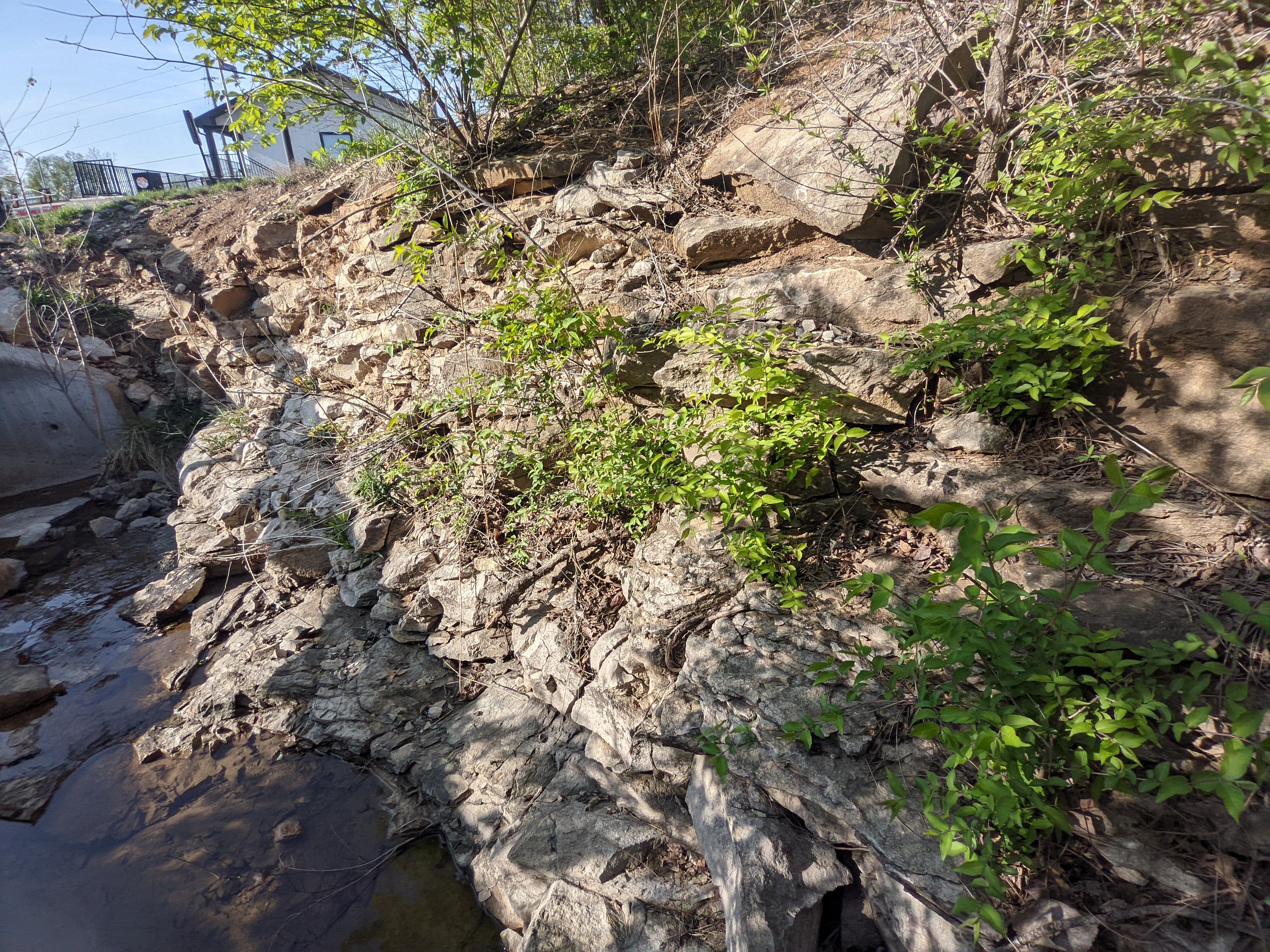
The wavy beds of Cement City Limestone. This texture is common in "Upper Limestone" formations deposited in shallower, more agitated water.

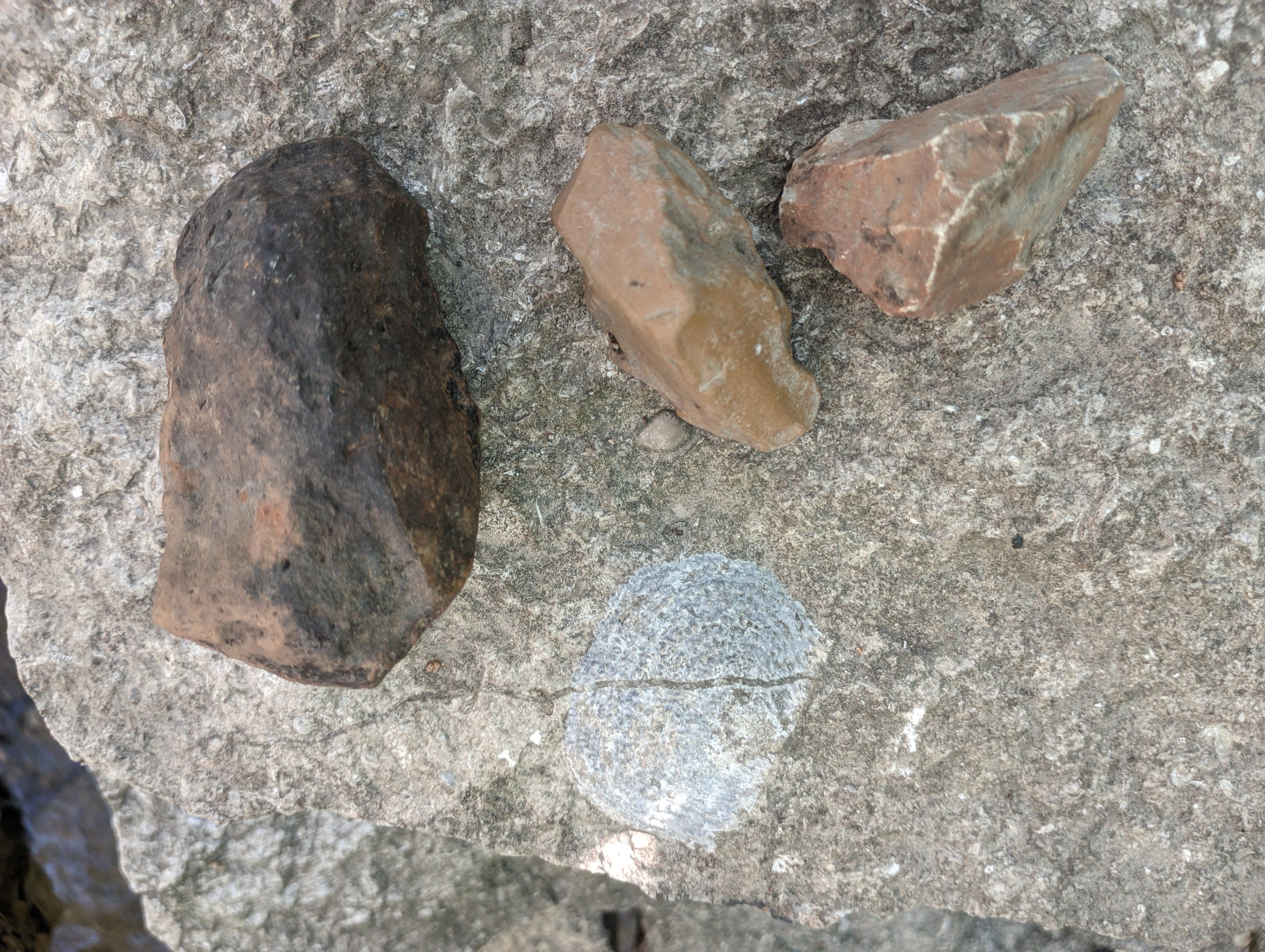
Chert nodules and a fossil imprint in Cement City Limestone. Several of the group's limestone members are described as cherty.

== See also ==
- List of fossiliferous stratigraphic units in Missouri
- Paleontology in Missouri
- List of fossiliferous stratigraphic units in Kansas
- Paleontology in Kansas
