= Dennis Formation =

Geologic formation in Missouri, United States

- Stratigraphic range: Carboniferous
- Type: Formation

Location
- Region: Missouri
- Country: United States

The Dennis Formation is a geologic formation in Missouri. It preserves fossils dating back to the late Carboniferous period. The formation is part of the Kansas City Group, Missourian Stage, Pennsylvanian subperiod of the Carboniferous period.

The formation members, from bottom to top, are Canville Limestone, Stark Shale, and Winterset Limestone.

The three members form the major part of a cyclothem, created as sea water rise quickly and then gradually fall again over millions of years.

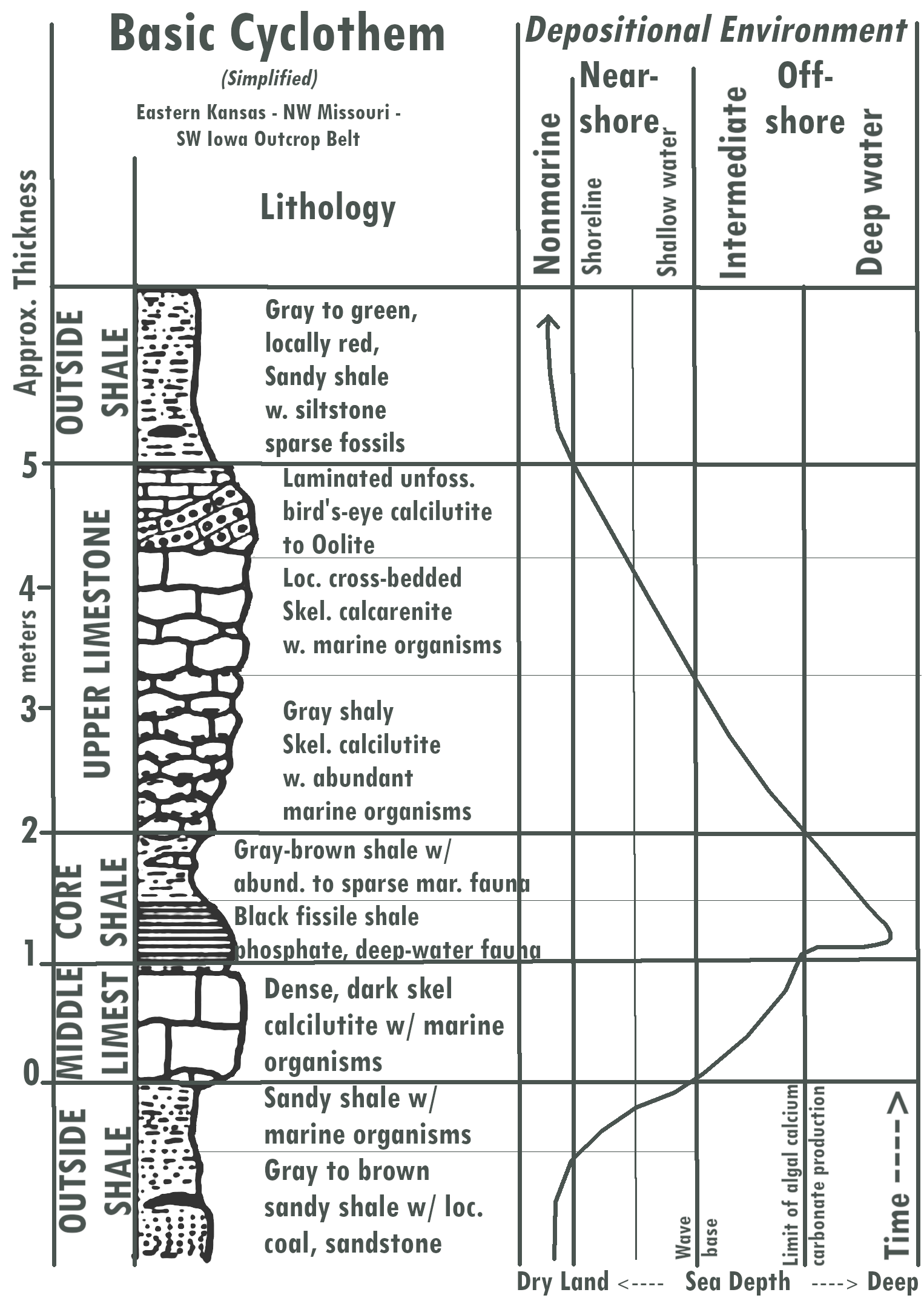
Simplified outline of a basic cyclothem as found in the geology of eastern Kansas, northwest Missouri, and southwest Iowa. After "Field Guide to Upper Pennsylvanian Cyclothemic Limestone Facies in Eastern Kansas", figure 4. Click to view at full size.

== Photos ==
Dennis Formation Examples
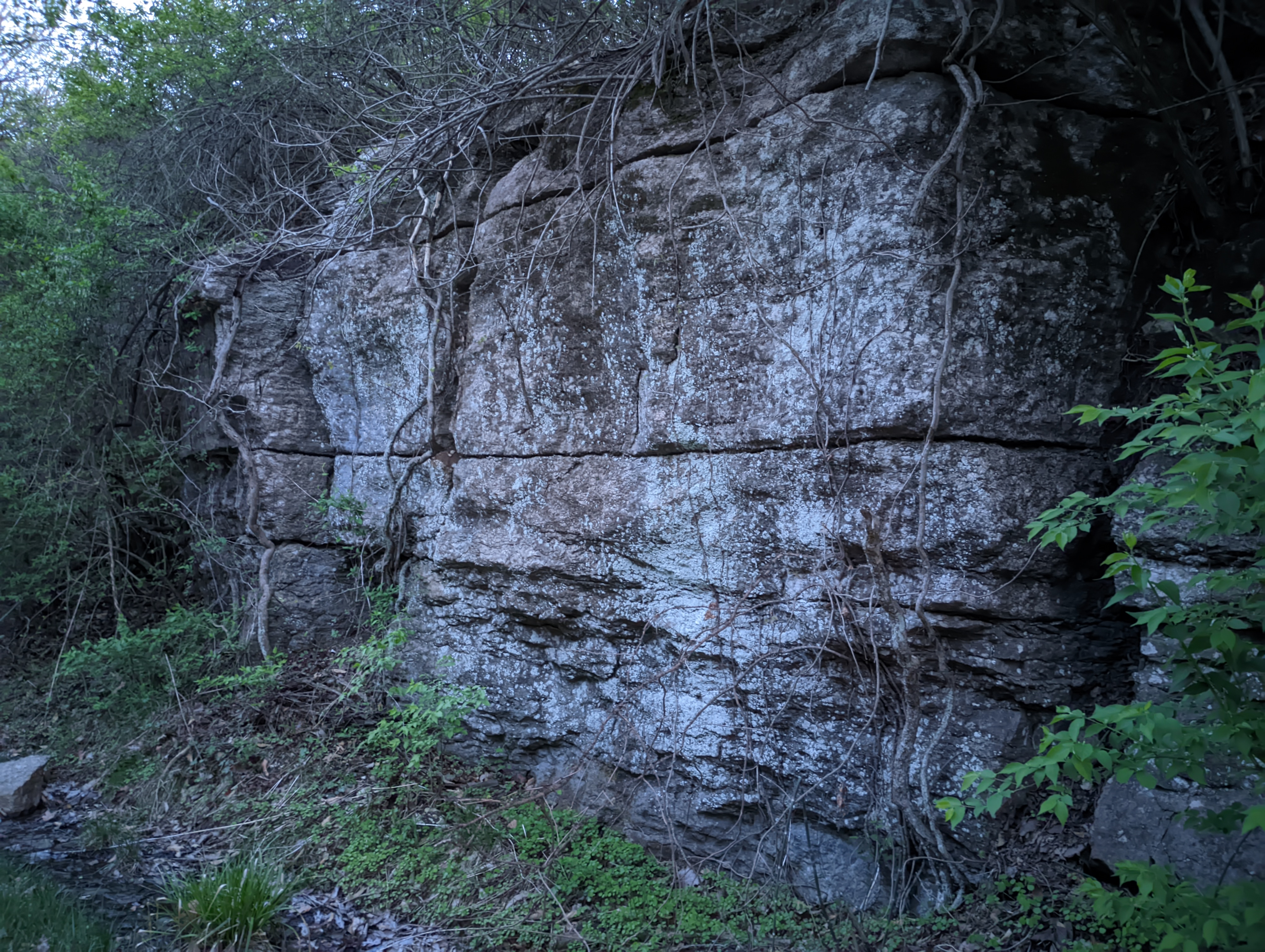
Railroad cut showing Winterset Limestone, Dennis Formation, Upper Bronson Subgroup, Kansas City Group, Missourian Series, Pennsylvanian System. Note thin horizontal partings - very thin layers of shale separating the limestone periodically - a characteristic of many Kansas City Group limestone members. The thin shale layers represent a short period of time under different environmental conditions, or perhaps even a single catastrophic or large-scale event. Raytown, Missouri.

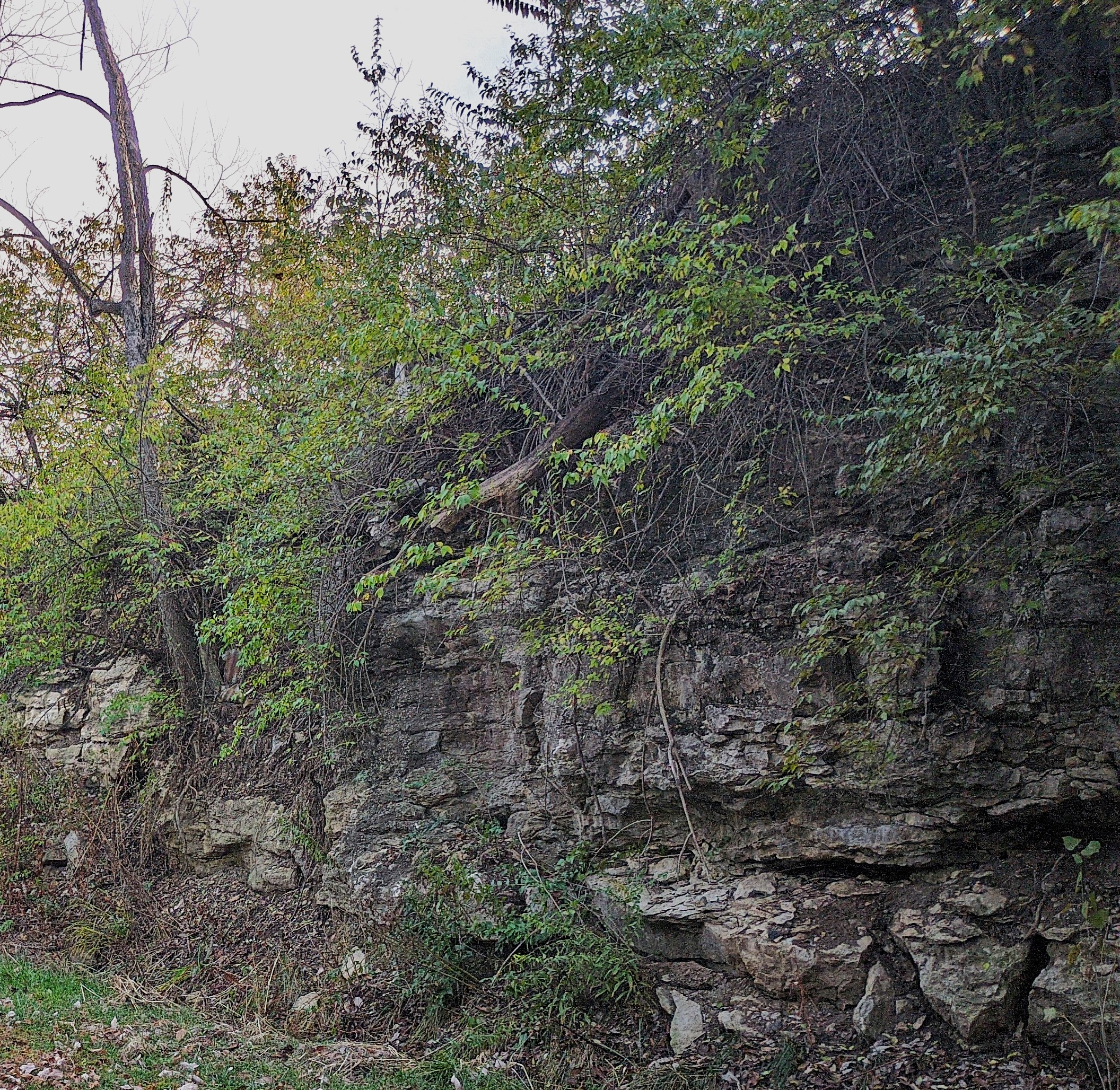
Railroad cut showing Winterset Limestone, Dennis Formation, Upper Bronson Subgroup, Kansas City Group, Missourian Series, Pennsylvanian System. Note the Stark Shale Member beneath the limestone - the softer shale has eroded and undercut the limestone above. Raytown, Missouri.

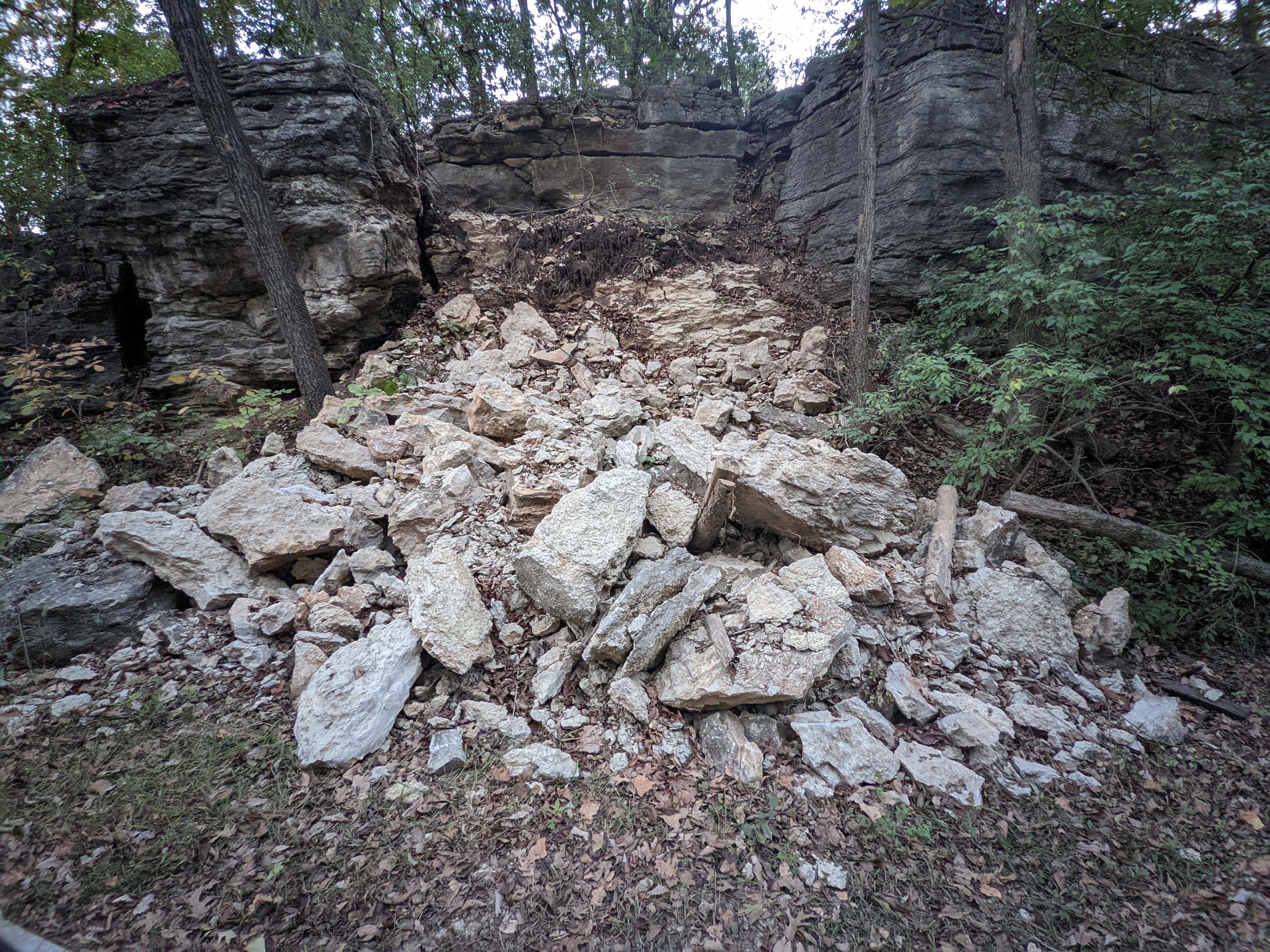
Railroad cut showing new rockfall Winterset Limestone next to older cliffs. Note the gray color of the weathered limestone vs the buff color of the new rockfall. Raytown, Missouri.

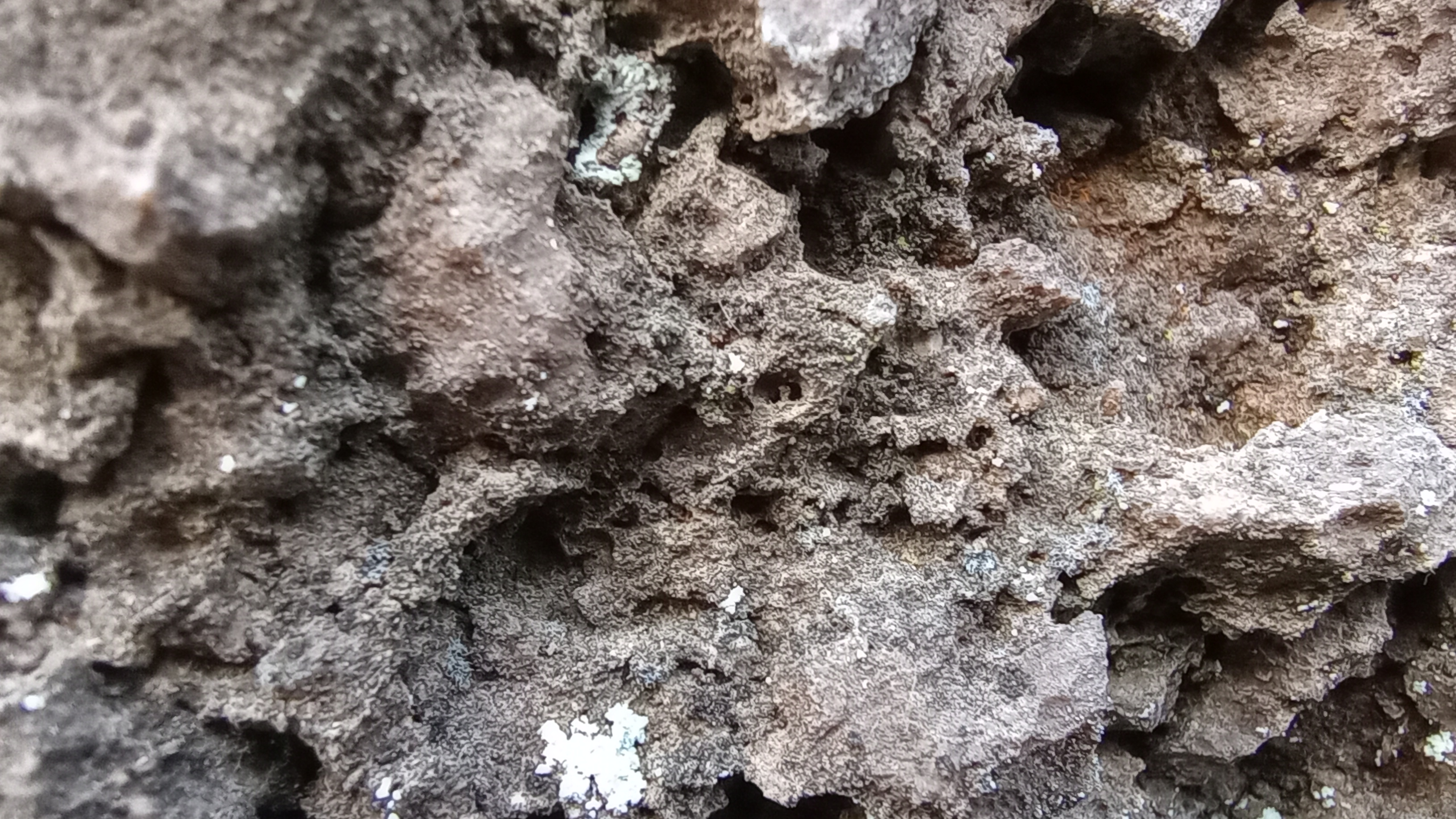
Detail of Winterset Limestone, Dennis Formation, Upper Bronson Subgroup, Kansas City Group, Missourian Series, Pennsylvanian System. Raytown, Missouri.
Dennis Formation

== See also ==
- "Life in Kansas City 300 Million of Years Ago," by Richard J. Gentile (video)
- The Geology of Kansas City (Field Trip), Richard Gentile
- Kansas City On the Rocks - Geological Field Trip
- Kansas City Bedrock Geology Map
- Late Pennsylvanian Fossils in Kansas
- List of fossiliferous stratigraphic units in Missouri
- Paleontology in Missouri
