= Wyandotte Formation =

Geologic formation in Missouri, United States

- Stratigraphic range: Carboniferous
- Type: Formation

Location
- Region: Missouri
- Country: United States

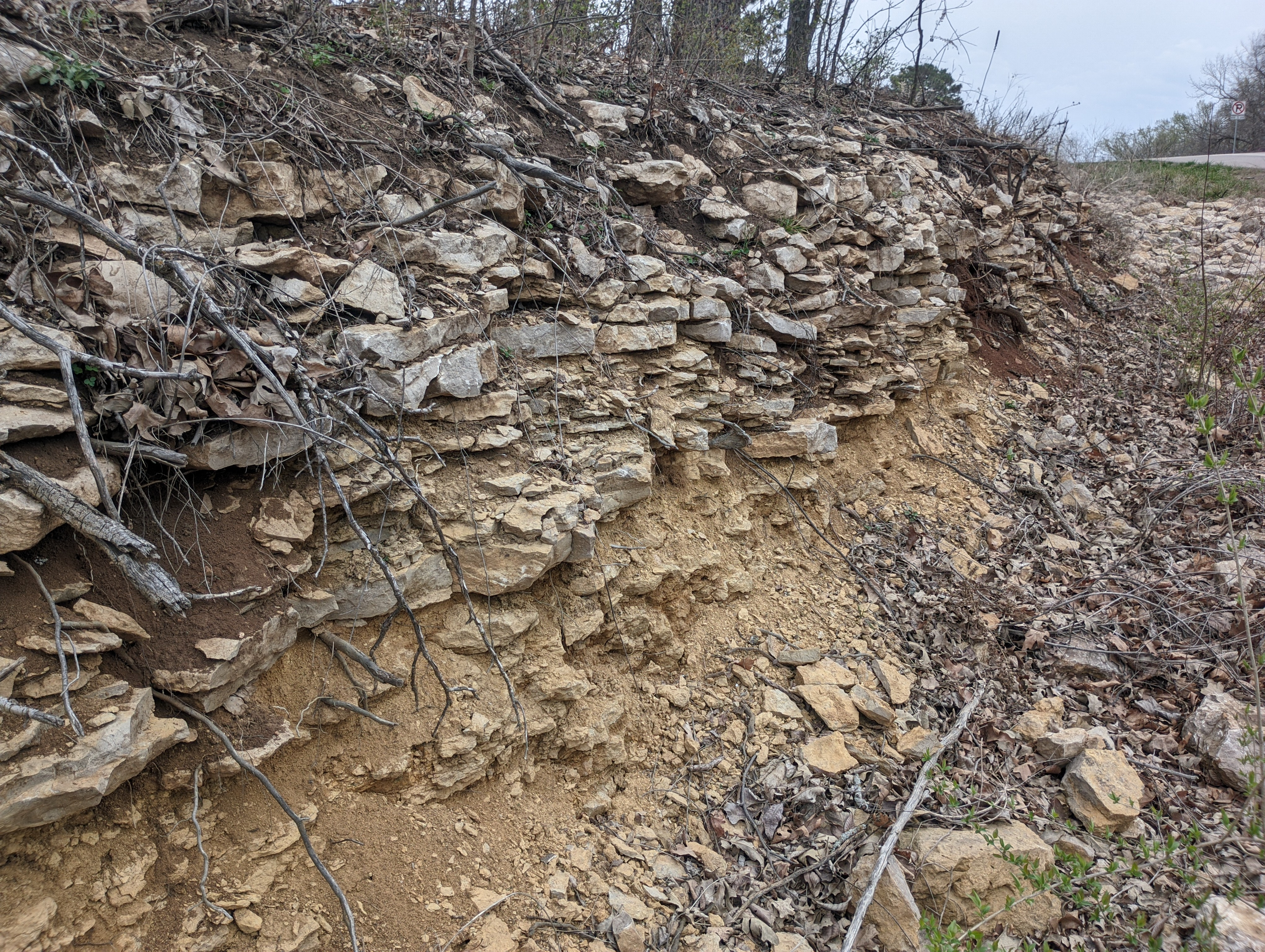
An outcrop of Argentine Limestone, Wyandotte Formation near Shawnee Mission Lake in Johnson County, Kansas.

The Wyandotte Formation is a geologic formation in Missouri. It preserves fossils dating back to the Carboniferous period.

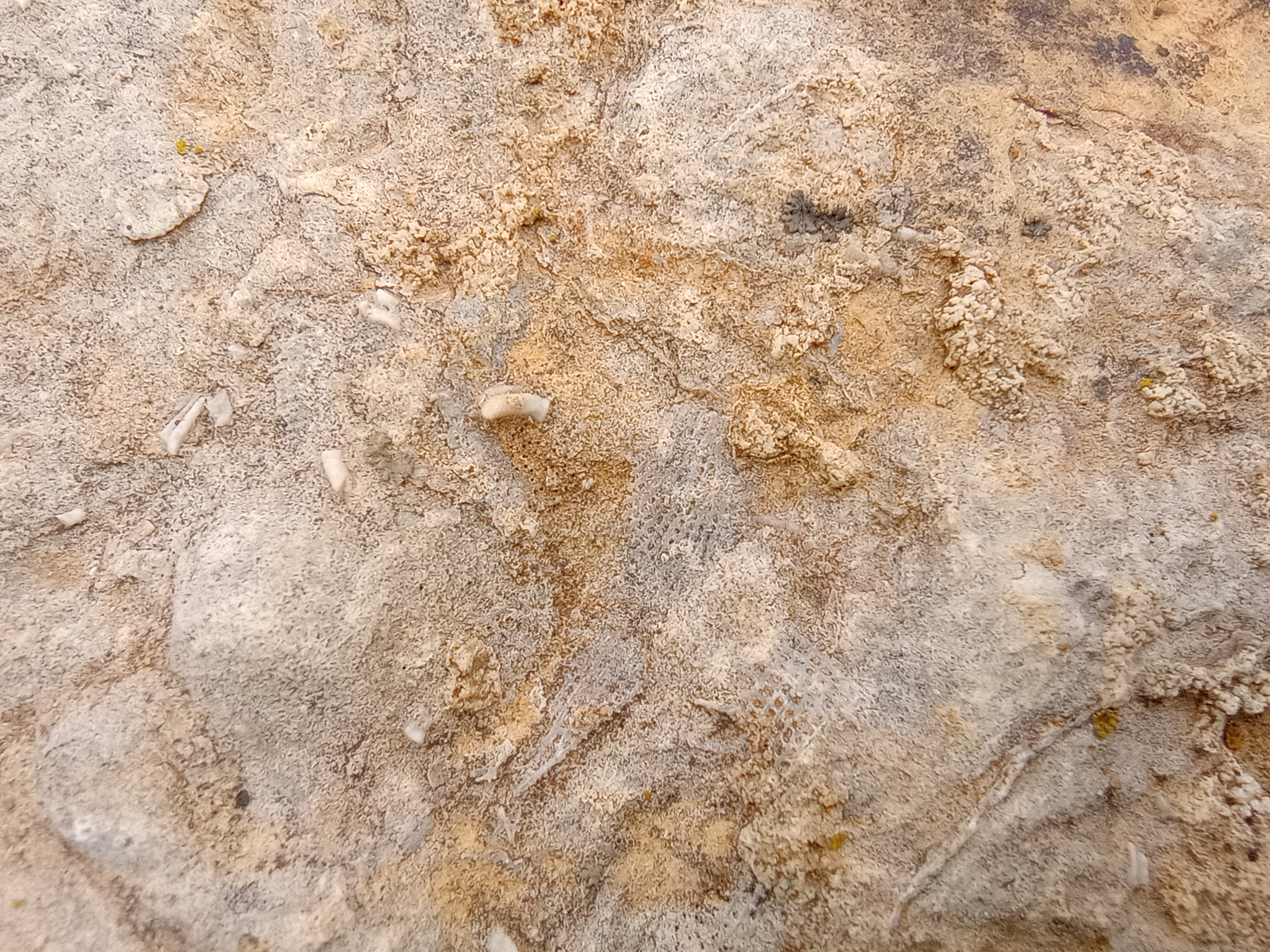
Detail of Argentine Limestone, Wyandotte Formation, Middle Zarah Subgroup, Kansas City Group, Missourian Series, Pennsylvanian System showing fossil fragments. Taken at an outcrop near Shawnee Mission Lake, Johnson County, Kansas.

The Wyandotte Formation is part of the Middle Zarah Subgroup of the Kansas City Group and members, from oldest to youngest, are the Frisbie Limestone, Quindaro Shale, and Argentine Limestone Members.

Frisbie Limestone is a 0.5 to 3.0 feet dark-gray, thin-bedded shaly limestone.

Quindaro Shale is 0.5 to 1.5 feet of gray shale with thin lenses and nodular beds of tan limestone.

Argentine Limestone is a fossiliferous limestone. Algal material is thought to be the most important constituent, although many invertebrate fossils also occur in it. Thickness varies from more than 40 ft at Kansas City to less than 1 ft in northern Missouri.

== The Wyandotte Formation as a Cyclothem ==
Like all formations in the Kansas City Group, the Wyandotte Formation is a cyclothem, created by the periodic rise and fall of sea level over time, resulting in alternating bands of shale and limestone as sea levels in a particular location vary from non-marine/tidal to shallow seawater to deep seawater and back through shallow seawater and tidal/non-marine.

In this case, the narrow Frisbie Limestone represents Middle Limestone of a cyclothem (created in shallow seawater, below wave depth, and only a narrow band because sea levels rise quickly as ice sheets melt), the Quindaro Shale represents Core Shale (created when the sea level becomes too deep for limestone to form), and the thicker Argentine Limestone represents Upper Limestone (created in shallow seawater as the sea levels gradually drop again, and much thicker because the sea level drop is far slower and takes far longer).

== See also ==
- List of fossiliferous stratigraphic units in Missouri
- Paleontology in Missouri
