= Callaway Limestone =

Geologic formation in Missouri

- Stratigraphic range: Devonian
- Type: Formation

Location
- Region: Missouri
- Country: United States

The Callaway Limestone is a geologic formation in Missouri. It preserves fossils dating back to the Devonian period.

== See also ==
- List of fossiliferous stratigraphic units in Missouri
- Paleontology in Missouri
