= Theodosia Formation =

Geologic formation in the United States

- Stratigraphic range: Ordovician
- Type: Formation

Location
- Region: Arkansas, Missouri
- Country: United States

Type section
- Named for: Theodosia, Ozark County, Missouri
- Named by: James Shelley Cullison

The Theodosia Formation is a geologic formation in Missouri. It preserves fossils dating back to the Ordovician period.

The Rich Fountain Formation was proposed in 1944 as the equivalent of the lower part of the Jefferson City Formation in a new Jefferson City Group. The Theodosia Formation was proposed as the equivalent of the upper Jefferson City and the lower portion of the overlying Cotter Formation. This formation was also proposed for use in Arkansas by the original author of the name, but it was never used by other workers in Arkansas.

== See also ==
- List of fossiliferous stratigraphic units in Arkansas
- List of fossiliferous stratigraphic units in Missouri
- Paleontology in Arkansas
- Paleontology in Missouri
