= Gulf Group =

Geologic group in Missouri

- Stratigraphic range: Cretaceous
- Type: Group

Location
- Region: Missouri
- Country: United States

The Gulf Group is a geologic group in Missouri. It preserves fossils dating back to the Cretaceous period.

== See also ==
- List of fossiliferous stratigraphic units in Missouri
- Paleontology in Missouri

== Bibliography ==
- Various Contributors to the Paleobiology Database. "Fossilworks: Gateway to the Paleobiology Database". Archived from the original on 25 March 2022.
