= Leemon Formation =

Geologic formation in Missouri, United States

- Stratigraphic range: Ordovician
- Type: Formation

Location
- Region: Illinois and Missouri
- Country: United States

The Leemon Formation is a geologic formation in Missouri. It preserves fossils dating back to the Ordovician period.

== See also ==
- List of fossiliferous stratigraphic units in Missouri
- Paleontology in Missouri
