= Bowling Green Dolomite =

Geological formation in Missouri

- Stratigraphic range: Silurian
- Type: Formation
- Unit of: Edgewood Group
- Underlies: Grassy Creek Shale (Devonian)
- Overlies: Bryant Knob Formation or Noix Limestone

Lithology
- Primary: Dolomite

Location
- Region: Pike County, NE Missouri
- Country: United States

Type section
- Named for: Bowling Green, Pike County, Missouri

The Bowling Green Dolomite is a geologic formation in Missouri. It preserves fossils dating back to the Silurian period.

== See also ==
- List of fossiliferous stratigraphic units in Missouri
- Paleontology in Missouri
