= Rich Fountain Formation =

Geologic formation in Missouri, United States

- Stratigraphic range: Ordovician
- Type: Formation

Location
- Region: Missouri
- Country: United States

Type section
- Named for: Rich Fountain, Osage County, Missouri

The Rich Fountain Formation is a geologic formation in Missouri. It preserves fossils dating back to the Ordovician period.

The Rich Fountain was proposed in 1944 as the equivalent of the lower part of the Jefferson City Formation in a new Jefferson City Group. The Theodosia Formation was proposed as the equivalent of the upper Jefferson City and the lower portion of the overlying Cotter Formation.

== See also ==
- List of fossiliferous stratigraphic units in Missouri
- Paleontology in Missouri
