= Noix Limestone =

Geologic formation in Missouri, United States

- Stratigraphic range: Ordovician
- Type: Formation
- Unit of: Edgewood Group
- Underlies: Silurian Bryant Knob Formation or Bowling Green Dolomite
- Overlies: Maquoketa Shale

Lithology
- Primary: Oolitic limestone

Location
- Region: Pike County, NE Missouri
- Country: United States

Type section
- Named for: Outcrops along Noix Creek just south of Louisiana, Pike County, Missouri

The Noix Limestone is a geologic formation in Missouri. It preserves fossils dating back to the Ordovician period.

== See also ==
- List of fossiliferous stratigraphic units in Missouri
- Paleontology in Missouri
