= Sulphur Springs Group =

- Stratigraphic range: Devonian
- Type: Group

Location
- Region: Missouri
- Country: United States

The Sulphur Springs Group is a geologic group in Missouri. It preserves fossils dating back to the Devonian period.

== See also ==
- List of fossiliferous stratigraphic units in Missouri
- Paleontology in Missouri
