= Burgner =

Burgner is a German surname. Notable people with the surname include:

- Daniel Burgner (born 1954), American bobsledder
- Dörte Burgner, married name of German painter Dodo (1907–1998)
- Jessica Burgner-Kahrs (born 1981), German roboticist

== See also ==
- Burgner Formation, a geological formation in Missouri, US
