= Bryant Knob Formation =

Geologic formation in Missouri, United States

- Stratigraphic range: Silurian
- Type: Formation
- Unit of: Edgewood Group
- Sub-units: Kissenger Limestone
- Underlies: Bowling Green Dolomite
- Overlies: Noix Limestone

Lithology
- Primary: Bioclastic limestone
- Other: shale, dolomitic limestone

Location
- Region: Pike County, NE Missouri
- Country: United States

Type section
- Named for: Bryant Knob
- Named by: Thompson and Satterfield, 1975

The Bryant Knob Formation is a geologic formation in Missouri. It preserves fossils dating back to the Silurian period.

== See also ==
- List of fossiliferous stratigraphic units in Missouri
- Paleontology in Missouri
