= Fort Scott Limestone =

Geological formation

- Stratigraphic range: Carboniferous
- Type: Formation
- Unit of: Marmaton Group
- Sub-units: Blackjack Creek Formation, Little Osage Formation, Higginsville Formation

Location
- Region: Kansas, Illinois, Missouri, Oklahoma
- Country: United States

Type section
- Named for: Fort Scott, Bourbon County, Kansas
- Named by: G. C. Swallow, 1866

The Fort Scott Limestone or Fort Scott Subgroup is a geologic formation in Illinois, Kansas, Missouri, and Oklahoma. It preserves fossils dating back to the Carboniferous period.

== See also ==
- List of fossiliferous stratigraphic units in Illinois
