= Chanute Formation =

Geologic formation in the United States

- Stratigraphic range: Carboniferous
- Type: Formation

Location
- Region: Kansas, Missouri, Oklahoma
- Country: United States

The Chanute Formation is a geologic formation in Kansas, Missouri, and Oklahoma. It preserves fossils dating back to the Carboniferous period.

== See also ==
- List of fossiliferous stratigraphic units in Missouri
- Paleontology in Missouri
