= Delocrinus =

Delocrinus Temporal range: Carboniferous–Permian

Scientific classification
- Kingdom: Animalia
- Phylum: Echinodermata
- Class: Crinoidea
- Order: †Dendrocrinida
- Family: †Catacrinidae
- Genus: †Delocrinus; Miller and Gurley, 1890

Species
- Delocrinus admirensis; Delocrinus densus; Delocrinus missouriensis; Delocrinus titicara; Delocrinus vastus; Delocrinus verbeeki; Delocrinus vulgatus

Genus of animal

Delocrinus is a genus of extinct crinoids, belonging to the family Catacrinidae. Specimens have been found in Kansas, Missouri, Nebraska, Nevada, Oklahoma, Arizona, Iowa, Texas, Utah and Virginia.

Eperisocrinus missouriensis, formerly Delocrinus missouriensis, was made the state fossil of Missouri in 1989.

== Description ==
Like extant crinoids, Delocrinus species was anchored to a hard surface by a holdfast out of which grew an articulated stalk. On top of this was a calyx with a number of feather-like arms. Each arm bore short branches known as pinnules and from these cirri were extended which sifted plankton from the water flowing past.
