= Iola Formation =

Geologic formation in the United States

- Stratigraphic range: Carboniferous
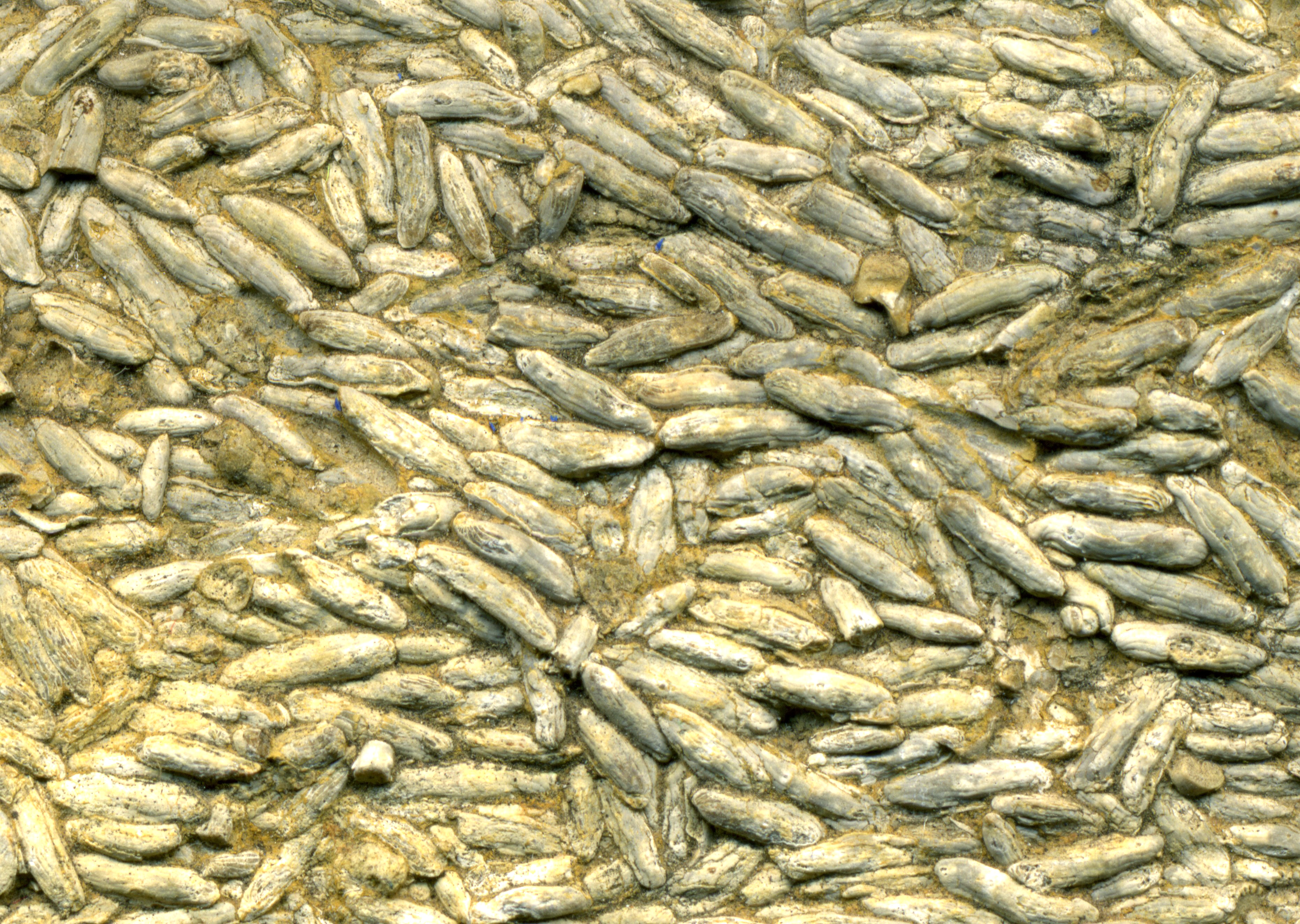
- Fossiliferous limestone (Raytown Member, Iola Formation; Elk County, Kansas)
- Type: Formation
- Unit of: Kansas City Group
- Sub-units: Raytown Member

Location
- Region: Illinois, Oklahoma, Kansas, Iowa
- Country: United States

The Iola Formation is a geologic formation in Illinois, Iowa, Kansas and Oklahoma. It preserves fossils dating back to the Carboniferous period.

== See also ==
- List of fossiliferous stratigraphic units in Illinois
