= Enon, Moniteau County, Missouri =

Unincorporated community in Missouri, U.S.

Coordinates: 38.45697°N 92.48963°W

Enon is an unincorporated community in Moniteau County, Missouri, United States.

== History ==
A post office called Enon was established in 1882, and remained in operation until 1968. The community is named for the river Ænon, in Palestine, where John the Baptist baptized the people.
