= Marmaton Group =

Geologic group located in Illinois, USA

- Stratigraphic range: Carboniferous
- Type: Group

Location
- Region: Illinois
- Country: United States

The Marmaton Group is a geologic group located in Illinois. It preserves fossils dating back to the Carboniferous period.

== See also ==
- List of fossiliferous stratigraphic units in Illinois
