= Cyclothems =

Alternating sequences of marine and non-marine sediments

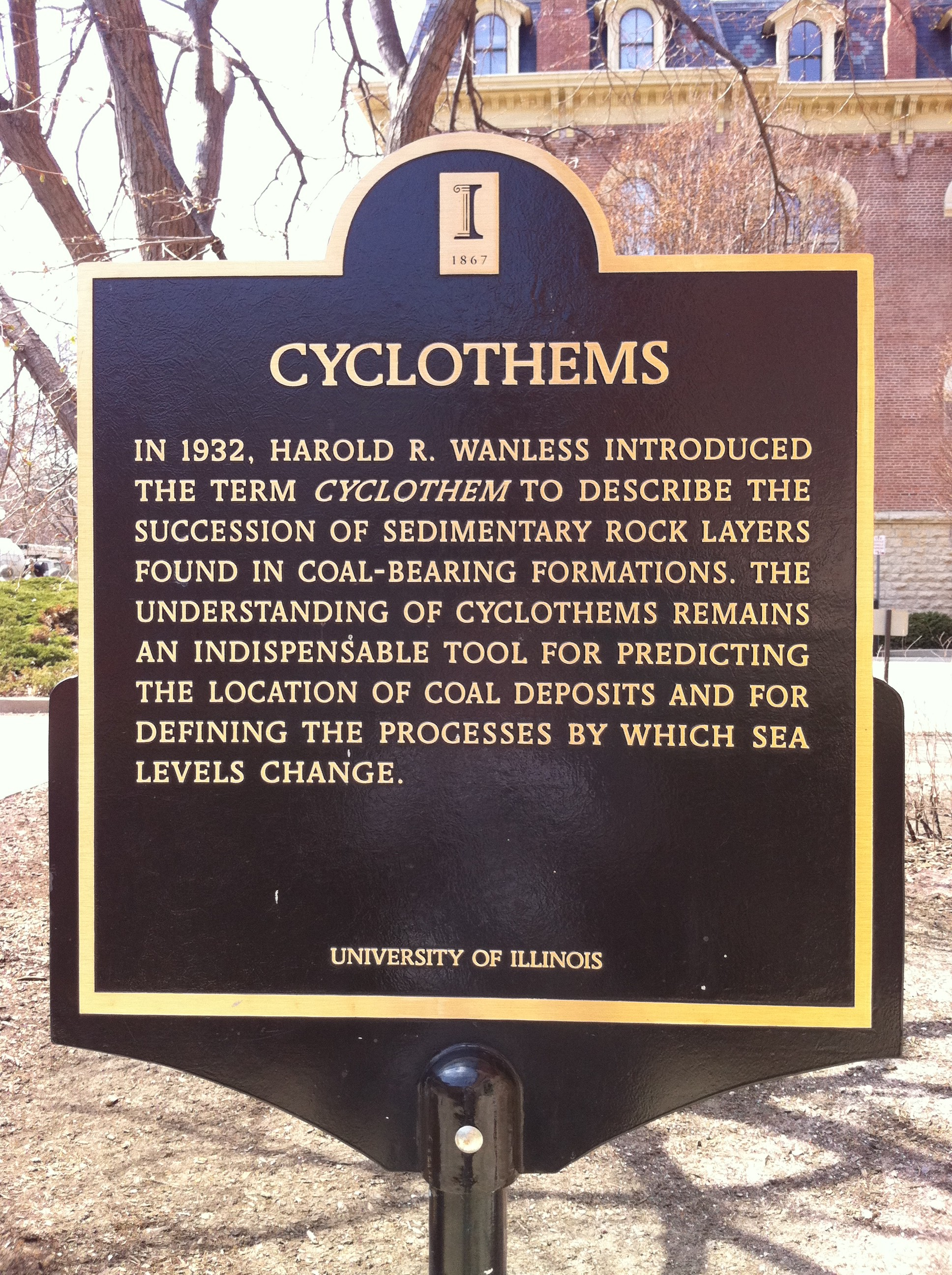
Originally proposed by Harold Wanless of the University of Illinois, to describe a Pennsylvanian-age rock succession in western Illinois

In geology, cyclothems are alternating stratigraphic sequences of marine and non-marine sediments, sometimes interbedded with coal seams. The cyclothems consist of repeated sequences, each typically several meters thick, of sandstone resting upon an erosion surface, passing upwards to pelites (finer-grained than sandstone) and topped by coal.

Historically, the term was defined by the European coal geologists who worked in coal basins formed during the Carboniferous and earliest Permian periods. Depositional sequences have been thoroughly studied by oil geologists using geophysical profiles of continental and marine basins. A general theory of basin-scale deposition has been formalized under the name of sequence stratigraphy.

Some cyclothems may have formed as a result of marine regressions and transgressions related to growth and decay of ice sheets, respectively, as the Carboniferous was a time of widespread glaciation in the southern hemisphere. A more general interpretation of sequences invokes Milankovitch cycles.

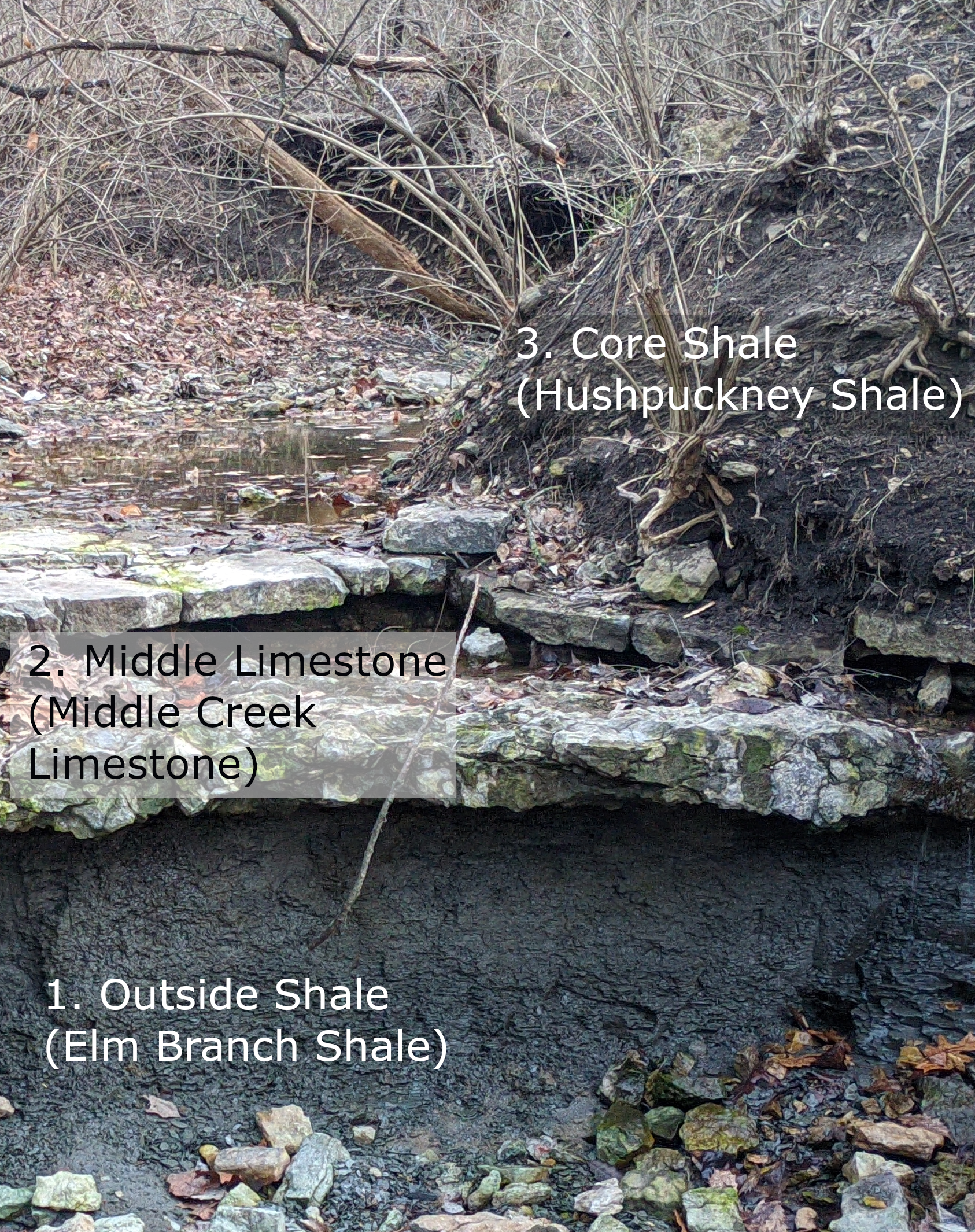
This image illustrates the first three stages of a typical cyclothem as found in eastern Kansas and western Missouri. **Stage 1, Outside Shale (non-marine). **Stage 2, Middle Limestone (fast-rising seawater). **Stage 3, Core Shale (deep seawater). **In situ, shale layers are often seen as slumping hillside. As the Hushpuckney Shale layer in this photo, the shale is covered with soil and not seen. **Middle Limestone often has beds separated by a thin shale layer - as we see here with the Middle Creek Limestone's two relatively thin beds of limestone separated by a very thin layer of shale. Here, you see the effects of water erosion on the two separated layers of limestone. (Creekbed near Lees Summit, Missouri)

== Upper Pennsylvanian Cyclothems in the Kansas-Iowa Outcrop Belt ==
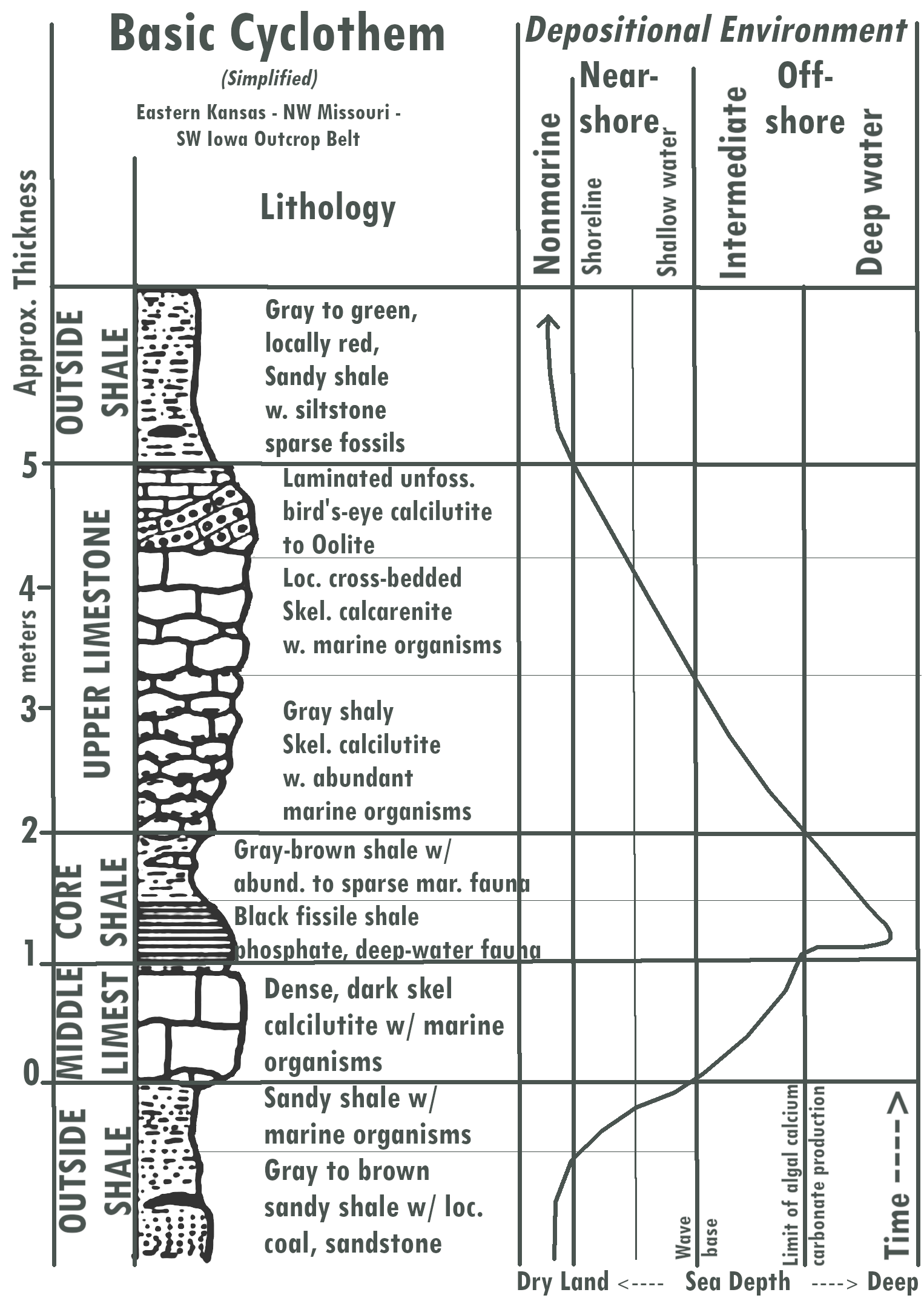
Simplified outline of a basic cyclothem as found in the geology of eastern Kansas, northwest Missouri, and southwest Iowa. After "Field Guide to Upper Pennsylvanian Cyclothemic Limestone Facies in Eastern Kansas", figure 4. Click to view at full size.

The Upper Pennsylvanian strata in a wide belt stretching across eastern Kansas, northwest Missouri, and southwest Iowa form a series of cyclothems and megacyclothems.

Geologist Philip Heckel has characterized these megacyclothems, in simplified form, as having four stages:

1. Outside Shale. At the lowest sea level, the area was a non-marine environment adjacent to the nearby sea. The area may have been low-lying and swampy, receiving outflows of detritus and, sometimes, sand from streams and downwash from adjacent land. The result is a gray to brown sandy shale with local coal and sandstone deposits. As the sea level begins to rise slightly, this turns to sandy shale with marine biota.
2. Middle Limestone. Sea levels begin to rise, typically due to melting of ice sheets. Because the melting process and resulting rise in sea level is typically quite fast-moving, this phase is shorter than the later regressive phase of the sea levels - and thus creates a thinner, denser, and more uniform limestone layer. This phase begins when the sea level is deep enough that the layer was below the wave base, allowing calcium carbonate deposits to accumulate steadily, undisturbed by wave action. Invertebrate marine fossils are present as are preserved algae - the primary biological driver of the calcium carbonate deposits. Thin layers of shale between thicker section of limestone are often present, and may represent a layer of detritus from flooding or some other major outflow event or some other relatively brief change in conditions.
3. Core Shale. As the sea level continues to rise, the sea depth reaches a limit beyond which the algae can no longer create calcium carbonate. Accumulation of calcium carbonate - and thus limestone - ends. The deep-water conditions create a thin, gray layer of marine shale - typically 0.3 to 2 meters thick - lacking sand and holding only fossils of organisms known to frequent deep water areas. These layers were created by very slow process of sedimentation in deep water under anoxic (very low oxygen) conditions. The deposits are rich in heavy metals and phosphate, which was created by the slow decay of immense blooms of plankton, which slowly settled to the sea floor.
4. Upper Limestone. As ice sheets slowly grow again, the sea levels slowly decline. As soon as sea depth in this area becomes shallow enough that algae can once again resume the production of calcium carbonate, the accumulation of limestone formations begins again. Because the decline in sea levels is far slower than the rise was - typically taking around three times as long - this layer of limestone is far thicker and also, typically, more varied than was the Middle Limestone. This layer can be 3–9 meters in thickness. Again, preserved algae, marine invertebrates, and conodonts such as Ozarkodina - eel-like marine creatures lacking jaws but with numerous sharp teeth - are present. The lower part of this limestone typically consists of wavy-bedded limestone with a large number of fossils of many marine species. Thin layers of shale often separate the wavy-bedded limestone layers. The upper section of the Upper Limestone formation is often more varied from place to place - representing the disproportionate effect minor differences in topography can have in shallow waters, and in some cases reefs or shoals that accumulated atop the other layers. The limestone created under shallower seas reflects the greater agitation due to wave action and penetration of light expected at those shallower depths.
5. Outside Shale again. As sea levels continue to decrease, we finally reach the stage where shale accumulates in very shallow seas, along the seashore, and then in drier areas just above sea level - as in the beginning (Stage 1). Some areas were ancient stream or river deltas, with deposits of material weathered from rocks in present-day Oklahoma. In these areas we may see shale deposits interspersed with lenses of sandstone, siltstone, or other sedimentary rock. And, again, we may find local coal deposits created in more substantial swamps or marshy areas.

R.C. Moore recognized three types of cyclothems in this area: The Cherokee Cyclothem, the Wabaunsee Cyclothem, and the Shawnee Megacyclothem, each characterized by variations of this basic pattern depending on individual variance in water depth and other factors. For example, the Shawnee Megacylothem has two additional limestone layers - which Moore names the Super Limestone and the Fifth Limestone - with a shale layer between each pair of limestone layers.

== Variations ==
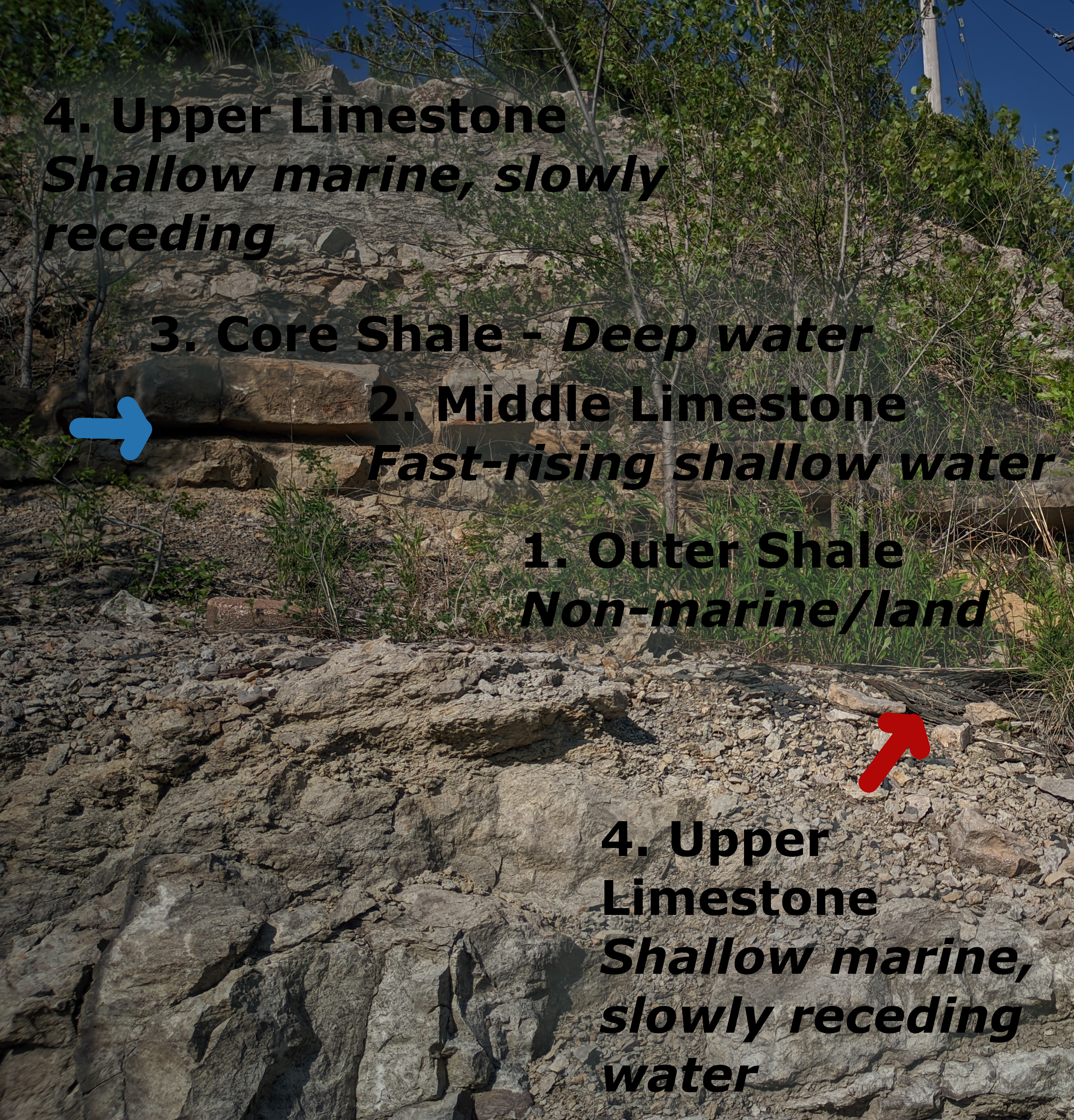
Cliffside exposure of the Kansas City Group showing a full cyclothem from Upper Limestone through Outer Shale, Middle Limestone, Core Shale, and back to Upper Limestone. **Red Arrow: Note chunks of thin-layered, dark-gray shale, which have dropped down from the Elm Branch/Ladore Shale layer just above. **Blue Arrow: Note the two relatively thin sections of Middle Creek Limestone parted by a very thin shale layer, seen here as a narrow crack. (Blue River, Kansas City, Missouri)
