= Paleontology in Missouri =

Paleontological research in the U.S. state of Missouri

The location of the state of Missouri

Paleontology in Missouri refers to paleontological research occurring within or conducted by people from the U.S. state of Missouri. The geologic column of Missouri spans all of geologic history from the Precambrian to present with the exception of the Permian, Triassic, and Jurassic. Brachiopods are probably the most common fossils in Missouri.

During the early Paleozoic, Missouri was covered by a warm shallow sea that would come to be home to creatures like Archimedes, brachiopods, shelled cephalopods, conodonts, corals, crinoids, armored fishes, and trilobites. During the Carboniferous a rich flora developed on land. Primitive tetrapods left behind footprints that would later fossilize. By the end of that period the sea had disappeared from the state. The Permian, Triassic, and Jurassic are missing from the local rock record. At that time southeastern Missouri was covered in seawater. On land, the state was home to dinosaurs. Missouri remained partially covered by seawater into the early Cenozoic while a great diversity of trees grew on land.

During the Ice Age the northern part of the state was covered in glaciers while the southern half was home to creatures like camels, mammoths, and mastodons. The state's mastodons are among the most prominent of its Ice Age mammal fauna.

The Pennsylvanian sea lily, Delocrinus missouriensis, is the Missouri state fossil. Hypsibema missouriensis is the state dinosaur.

== Prehistory ==
There are fossils in the Missouri Pre-Cambrian such as stromatolites (Ozarkcollenia laminata) and other moneran related structures. Missouri was covered by a shallow sea. During the Cambrian period Missouri was home to algae, which left behind spores, and linguloid brachiopods. Trilobites were also present but were less common. Missouri had a varied fauna during the ensuing Ordovician period. Ordovician life in the state included abundant branching bryozoans, tabulate corals, tetracorals, abundant crinoids, graptolites, abundant pelecypods, nautiloids (generally straight shelled, but sometimes coiled), Receptaculites, sponges (which left behind spicules), and trilobites (which were uncommon in the Early Ordovician). Graptolites were preserved in Jefferson and Pike counties, with the Jefferson County graptolites being the better preserved. Armored fish were among the vertebrates of Ordovician Missouri.

Later, during the Silurian period, Missouri was home to abundant lacy bryozoans, conodonts, tabulate corals, tetracorals, abundant crinoids, trilobites. Armored fish remained a part of Missouri's vertebrate fauna on into the Silurian.

Into the Devonian, there were a small number of ammonoids, conodonts, tabulate corals, tetracorals, abundant crinoids, a moderate number of nautloids (with both straight and coiled shells), abundant pelecypods, abundant stromatoporoids, and trilobites. Vertebrate life of Devonian Missouri included armored fish. The stromatoporoids often lived closely associated with the coral. On land, spore producing plants would be preserved in the northeastern part of the state.

During the Mississippian, Missouri was home to fairly abundant ammonoids, abundant Archimedes screws and Evactinopora bryozoan, very abundant blastoids, abundant lacy bryozoans, tabulate corals, tetracorals, endothyroid foraminferans, a moderate number of nautiloids, fairly abundant pelecypods, fairly abundant trilobites, abundant worms. The Burlington Formation of Mississippian Missouri is one of the most famous sources of crinoid fossils in the United States. Both straight and coiled shelled forms were present among the Mississippian nautiloids of Missouri. Worms left behind trace fossils in the form of their borings and tubes.

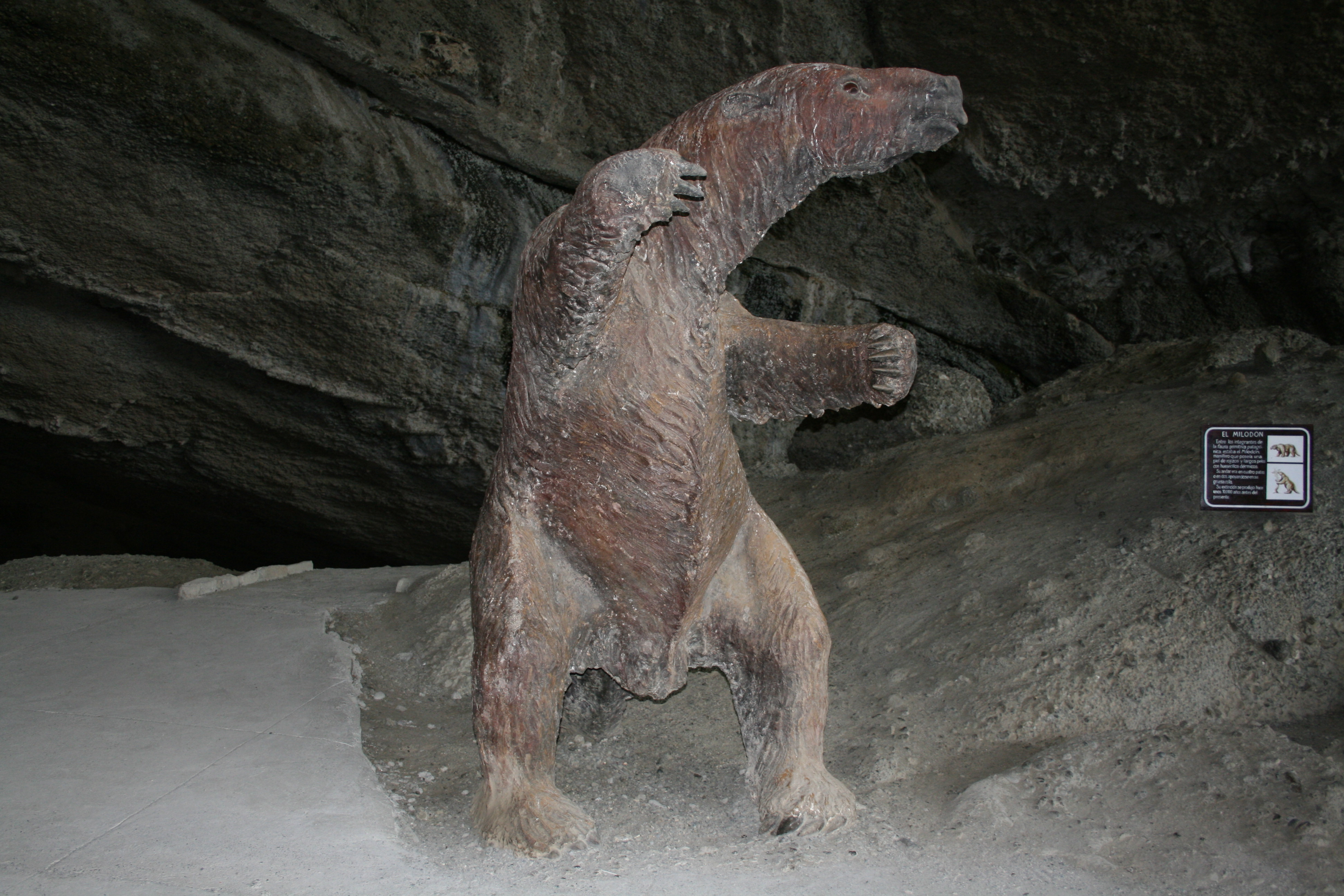
Model of Mylodon.

Pennsylvanian life of Missouri included fairly abundant ammonoids, relatively uncommon Archimedes screws, obriculoid brachiopods, abundant branching bryozoans, abundant lacy bryozoans, conodonts, tabulate corals, tetracorals, abundant crinoids, abundant fusulinids, nautiloids, fairly abundant pelecypods, and fairly abundant trilobites. The Pennsylvanian nautiloids of Missouri mostly had coiled shells but some forms were straight. Their remains are most common in the west-central region of the state. Pennsylvanian marine vertebrate life included armored fishes. On land, the Pennsylvanian plant life of Missouri included ferns, reeds, rushes, and scale trees. The rich flora left abundant plant fossils ranging from microscopic to large logs. Some of the state's early tetrapods left behind footprints that would later fossilize in the vicinity of Kansas City. The sea covering Missouri was gradually filled in by sediments eroded off mountains to the east. Missouri was no longer covered by the sea by the end of the Carboniferous.

Sedimentation resumed during the Cretaceous. Parts of Missouri were covered by the Western Interior Seaway at the time. The seawater again intruding onto Missouri originated from the Gulf of Mexico this time. The southeastern part of the state with Cretaceous sedimentation, became part of a region known as the Mississippi Embayment. On land, early flowering plants were blooming in the state. The fossil of the hadrosaurid dinosaur Parrosaurus and theropod dinosaurs have been found in Bollinger County. In fact, fossils of Parrosaurus are among the only known dinosaur remains in the state.

The Mississippi embayment still covered part of Missouri during the early Cenozoic. The state's early Cenozoic flora comprised plants typical of moderate climatic conditions. During the Eocene epoch of the Cenozoic era, the plant life of the time left behind fossils. Hickory, linden, sycamore, and walnut left behind remains in southeastern Missouri, especially, Stoddard and Scott County

During the Pleistocene epoch, glaciers intruded southward into Missouri, covering the region north of the Missouri River. At that time mastodons were widespread in Missouri. Mastodon remains were preserved in almost every county in the entire state. Mammoths were also present but left behind fewer fossils. Other Pleistocene mammals that once lived in Missouri include armadillos, bison, bears, camels, deer, horses, musk oxen, peccaries, porcupines, probable raccoons, sloths, and tapirs. A sinkhole near Enon in Moniteau County preserved non-mammalian fossils of the age like frog and turtle bones. Dire wolf and alligator fossils have also been unearthed in Missouri.

== History ==
=== Indigenous interpretations ===
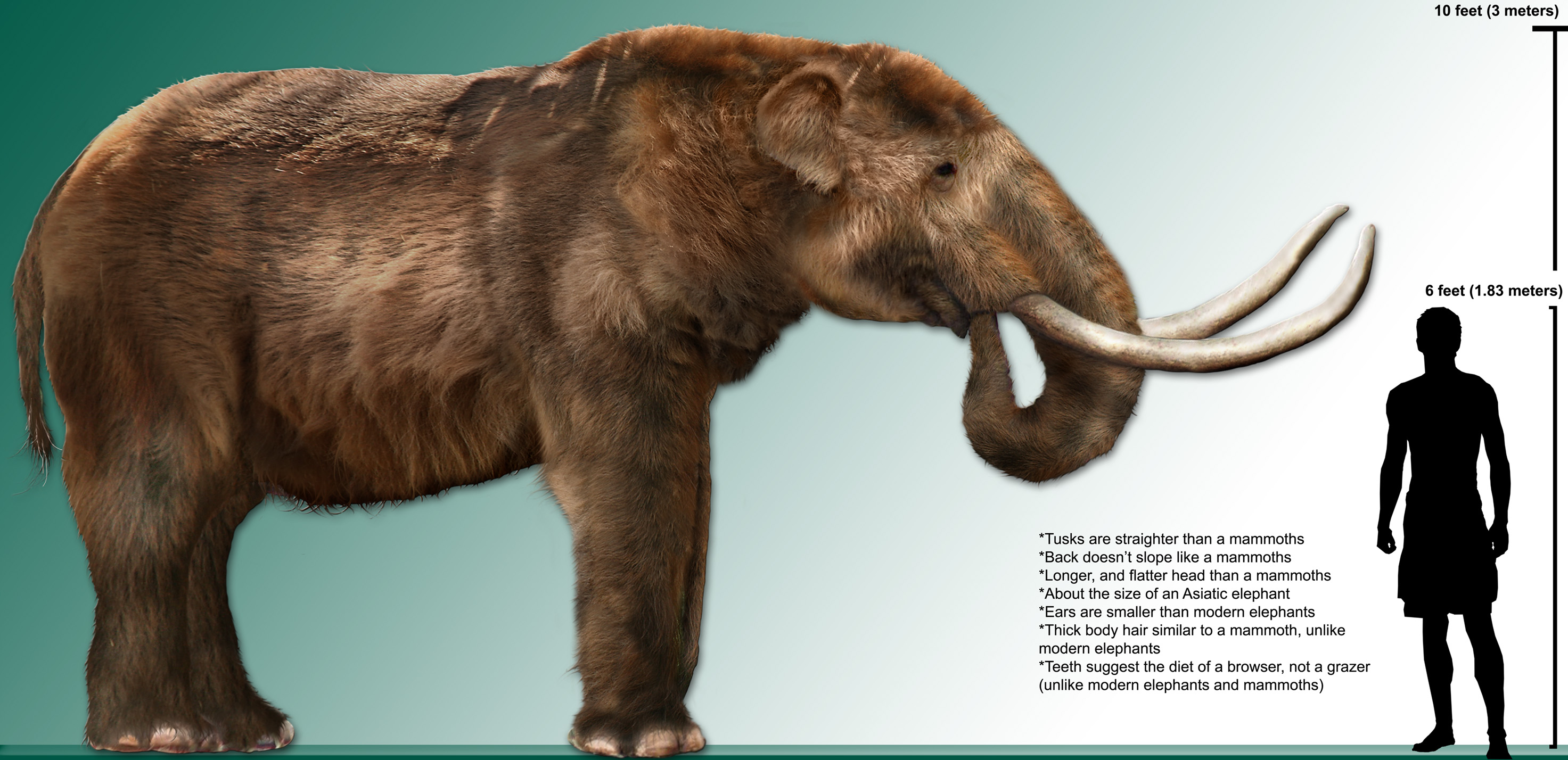
Life restoration of M. americanum.

A Missouri Osage tradition tells the story of an incursion by a diverse group of monsters into the area. The monsters marched along the Missouri and Mississippi Rivers from the east. Their arrival infuriated the local wildlife, who grew so violent that the natives were afraid to go out hunting. The animals and monsters waged a colossal war in a valley near a bluff called Rocky Ridge. After the fighting ended, the monsters continued their journey west. Other battles in the war between the animals and monsters occurred at the Pomme de Terre and Osage Rivers. When the fighting concluded the Osage people offered many of the animal casualties as a burnt offerings to the Great Spirit, who buried some of the carcasses in the Osage and Big Bone (Pomme de Terre) Rivers. This tale was commemorated by annual offerings performed at a table rock overlooking the Big Bone River. This story reflects the locals' interpretations of the abundant remains of animals like giant beavers, horses, mastodons, oxen, and giant ground sloths found in Missouri's river valleys. The details in the story about the remains being burnt or buried in the river reflects their preservation. Some of the fossils were burnt and others can be found on the river bed. One site later excavated by Albert Koch had burned bones associated with ashes. Lignite has lent some of the local fossils a black color which would give such specimens a burnt appearance.

=== Scientific research ===
Mammal fossils are generally uncommon in Missouri. Nevertheless, the state has been a source of spectacular finds. During the early 1800s, white settlers uncovered large fossil bones in the Big Bone River. During the 1820s vertebrate fossils were collected from a cave under St. Louis. Later, in 1838, The St. Louis Museum's Albert Koch uncovered fossils east of the Osage River that would later be identified as belonging to the ground sloth Mylodon. The next year, in 1839, Koch uncovered additional fossil bones and teeth near the Big Bone River. Koch cobbled together a fossil skeleton and included excess bones as the "Missourium". The "creature" became part of a traveling exhibit shown in Dublin, London, and Philadelphia.

In 1941 tunneling in southeastern Moniteau County uncovered a deposit of Pleistocene fossils near Enon. The remains were left behind by creatures like horses, tapirs, a sloth and two nearly complete turtle carapaces. In 1945 Dr. M. G. Mehl of the University of Missouri and his students discovered peccary fossils in the same cave that preserved the fossils discovered in 1820. In 1951 more than two hundred bones and teeth were excavated from a swampy area of a farm slightly southwest of Vienna belonging to a man named Andrew Buschmann. From 1956 to 1957 a variety of mammal fossils were excavated from a fissure in the ground of Ralls County about 4 miles north of the town of Perry. The bones were the disarticulated remains of bears, deer, mice, and a kind of eastern wood rat not currently found in the area of the fossil discovery. More recently, in 1989, the Pennsylvanian sea lily, Delocrinus missouriensis, was designated the Missouri state fossil. In 2004, Hypsibema missouriensis was designated the state dinosaur. This dinosaur occurrence is associated with clay beds in an area of anomalous geology which may be a graben and associated paleokarst which may be associated with the Reelfoot Rift System to the southeast. Known as the Chronister Vertebrate site, the age of which is Campanian of the Upper Cretaceous, the site has yielded the only known dinosaur fossils in Missouri.

== People ==
- Chester A. Arnold was born in Leeton on June 25, 1901.
- Michael S. Engel was born in Creve Coeur on 24 September, 1971.

== Natural history museums ==
- Bollinger County Museum of Natural History, Marble Hill (closed)
- Kansas City Museum, Kansas City
- Maramec Museum at Maramec Spring Park, St. James
- Missouri Institute of Natural Science, Springfield
- Saint Louis Science Center, St. Louis
- Ste. Genevieve Museum Learning Center, Ste. Genevieve
- Washington University, Dept. of Earth and Planetary Sciences, Forest Park Rd. and Hoyt Ave.

== Notable clubs and associations ==
- Eastern Missouri Society for Paleontology

== See also ==
- Paleontology in Arkansas
- Paleontology in Illinois
- Paleontology in Iowa
- Paleontology in Kansas
- Paleontology in Kentucky
- Paleontology in Nebraska
- Paleontology in Oklahoma
- Paleontology in Tennessee
