= Boone Formation =

Geologic formation in northwest Arkansas and northeast Oklahoma, United States

Boone Limestone
- Stratigraphic range: Mississippian
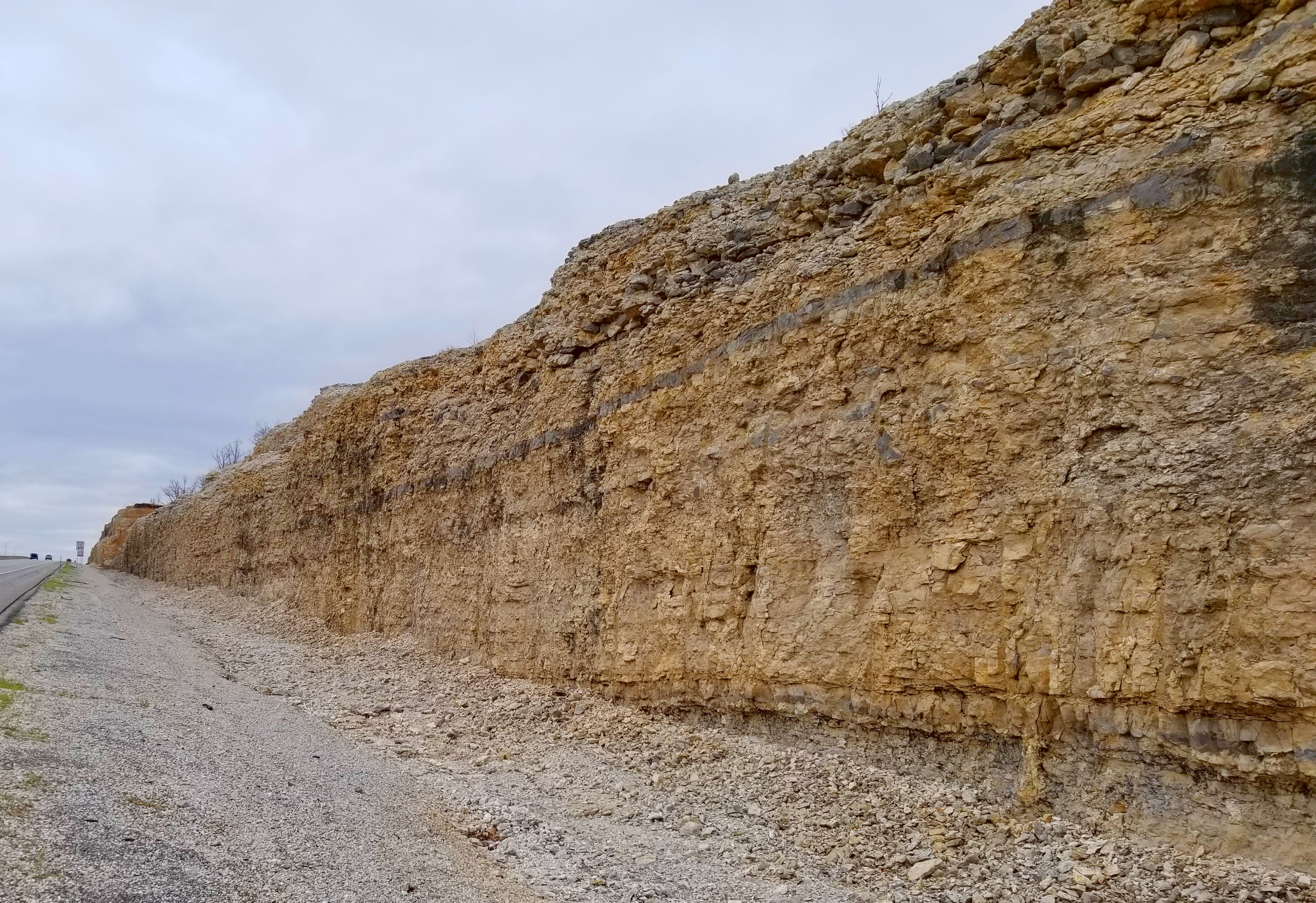
- Boone Formation along I-49 near the Arkansas-Missouri border
- Type: Formation
- Sub-units: St. Joe Limestone Member
- Underlies: Batesville Formation
- Overlies: Chattanooga Formation

Lithology
- Primary: Limestone
- Other: Chert

Location
- Region: Arkansas, Missouri, Oklahoma
- Country: United States

Type section
- Named for: Boone County, Arkansas
- Named by: John Casper Branner and Frederick William Simonds, 1891

The Boone Formation a discrete and definable unit of cherty limestone rock strata located in northwest Arkansas, Missouri and northeast Oklahoma.

The stratigraphy of the Boone Formation dates to the Mississippian age.

The Boone Formation is rich in fossils, and occasionally preserves the remains of sharks' teeth in outcrops along Buffalo National River.

Equivalent rocks of the Osagean in southwest Missouri include the Pierson Limestone, Fern Glen Formation, Reeds Spring Formation, Elsey Formation (including the Grand Falls Chert), Burlington Limestone and the Keokuk Limestone.
