= Chain of Rocks =

Chain of Rocks refers to a region of exposed bedrock in a riverbed. It may refer to multiple locations near the Illinois-Missouri border:

- Chain of Rocks, Missouri, a small town northwest of St. Louis
- The old Chain of Rocks Bridge, now restricted to pedestrian and bicycle traffic
  - The New Chain of Rocks Bridge, its vehicular replacement
- The Chain of Rocks Lock, a river-navigational structure nearby
- The former Chain of Rocks Amusement Park site nearby
