= Chouteau (disambiguation) =

Chouteau is a surname of a French-American family.

Chouteau also refers to:

- Chouteau County, Montana
- Chouteau, Oklahoma

== See also ==
- Lake Chouteau, on the Teton River
- Chouteau Formation, geologic formation in Illinois, Iowa, Kansas, and Missouri
- Chouteau Group, geologic group in Missouri
- Chouteau Township, Madison County, Illinois
- Chouteau Island, St. Louis, Missouri
