= Chouteau Township =

Chouteau Township is the name of two townships in the United States:

- Chouteau Township, Madison County, Illinois
- Chouteau Township, Clay County, Missouri
