= Northview Formation =

- Stratigraphic range: Mississippian
- Type: Geological formation
- Unit of: Chouteau Group
- Underlies: Pierson Limestone or Burlington Limestone
- Overlies: Sedalia Formation or Compton Limestone
- Thickness: up to 80 feet (24 m)

Lithology
- Primary: Shale
- Other: Siltstone, argillaceous limestone

Location
- Coordinates: 37°17′56″N 93°00′08″W
- Region: Missouri (southwest): Springfield Plateau section of the Ozarks

Type section
- Named for: Northview in Webster County, southwestern Missouri
- Named by: Stuart Weller
- Location: Section along old Highway 66 near Northview
- Year defined: 1899
- Coordinates: 37°17′56″N 93°00′08″W
- Region: Webster County, southwestern Missouri
- Country: United States

The Northview Formation is a geologic formation in southwest Missouri. Its fauna includes brachiopods and abundant trace fossils of the Mississippian subperiod and Kinderhookian Series.

== See also ==
- List of fossiliferous stratigraphic units in Missouri
- Paleontology in Missouri
