= Chouteau Island =

Island in Madison County, Illinois, United States

Coordinates: 38°46′07″N 90°08′47″W

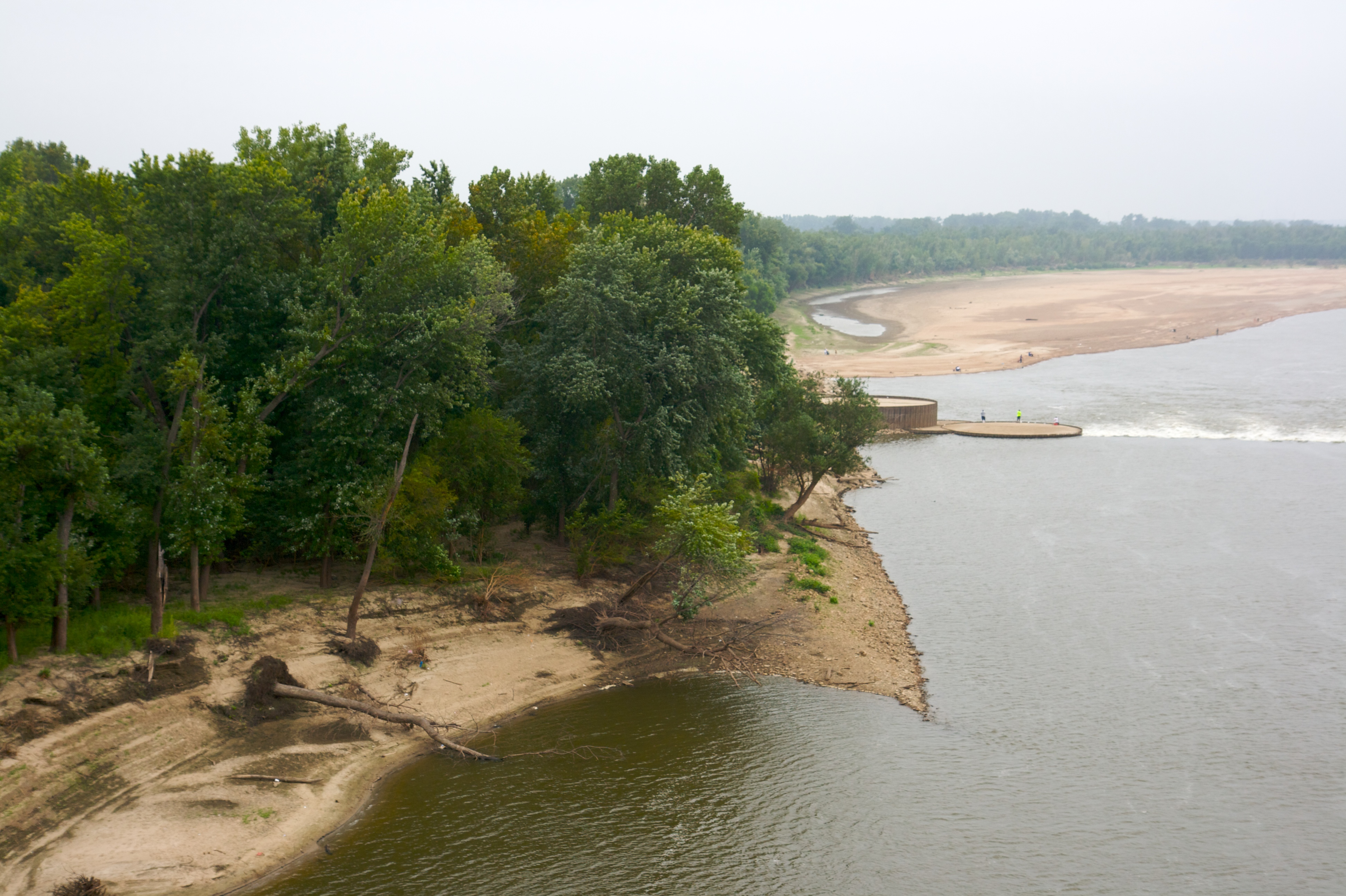
A view of Chouteau Island from the Chain of Rocks Bridge

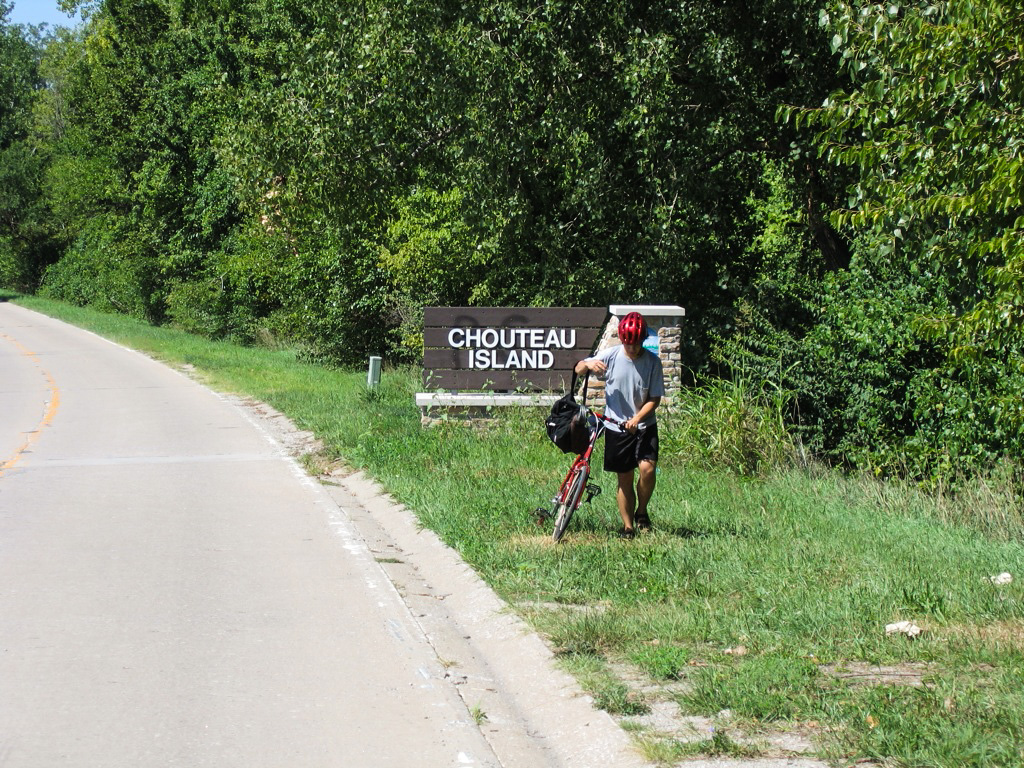
Bicyclist on Chouteau Island

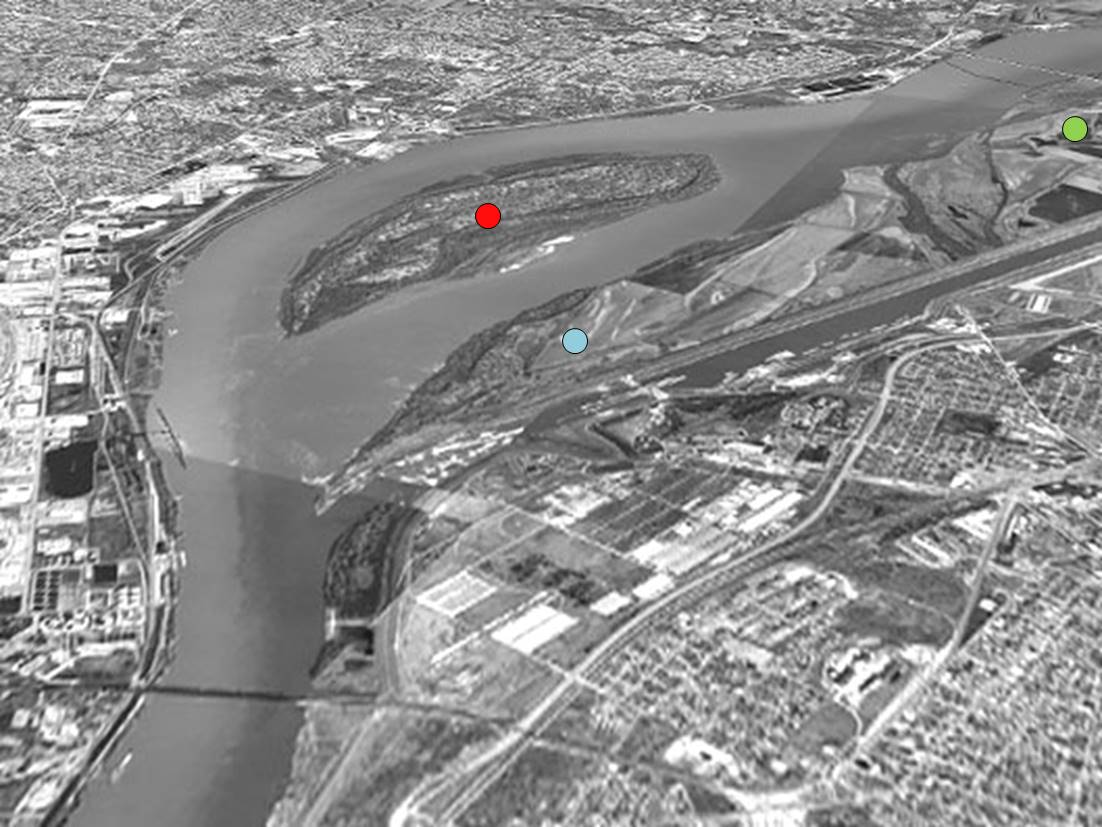
Aerial image showing Chouteau Island (green dot), Gabaret Island (blue dot), and Mosenthein Island (red dot)

Chouteau Island (/ʃoʊˈtoʊ/ shoh-TOH), situated approximately eight miles (13 km) due north of the Gateway Arch in St. Louis, Missouri, and approximately one mile (1.6 km) south of the confluence of the Missouri River and Mississippi River, is one of a cluster of three islands: Chouteau Island, Gabaret Island, and Mosenthein Island. The three, with a combined area of approximately 5,500 acres (20 km^{2}), are located in Madison County, Illinois.

== Description ==
The three-island complex is sometimes referred to as "Chouteau Island", though two occurred by nature and the third, Chouteau island itself, was made by digging a channel around it. The Chouteau island was created during the construction of the Chain of Rocks Canal between 1946 and 1953. Most of Chouteau Island lies in Chouteau Township, but its southern quarter lies in Venice Township, both in Madison County.

Gabaret Island and Mosenthein Island both lie entirely in Venice Township.

Chouteau Island is 3200 acres. Chouteau Island is bounded by the Mississippi River to the west and the Chain of Rocks Canal to the east. The 10 miles (16 km) of Mississippi River that border the Island on the west is the only natural stretch of the Mississippi without barge traffic between St. Paul, Minnesota, and New Orleans, Louisiana.

Chouteau Island is accessed by car only from Illinois via the Canal Bridge, a one-lane vehicular bridge that crosses the Chain of Rocks Canal. From Missouri, visitors may reach the Island by foot or bicycle traffic via U.S. Route 66's Old Chain of Rocks Bridge.

Chouteau Island is a key part of the Confluence Greenway, a regional recreation corridor. Popular events on the Island, include Eagle Days (held each January for watching bald eagles) and various recreational bicycle rides. Several walking/biking trails have been developed on the Island.

== History ==
Chouteau Island is the site of the first European settlement in Madison County, with evidence of French settlers dating to as early as 1750.

Lewis and Clark camped on Gabaret Island on December 11, 1803, prior to establishing Camp Dubois near Wood River, Illinois.

Mississippi River Lock #27 (Chain of Rocks Lock) is located at the south end of Chouteau Island. It is the southernmost lock on the Mississippi River, and the only one south of the confluence of the Mississippi and Missouri rivers.

Following the Great Flood of 1993, governments acquired all residences within the Island complex. Over 70 percent of Chouteau Island is now in public ownership, under the U.S. Army Corps of Engineers, the Illinois Department of Natural Resources and the city of Madison, Illinois.

The three agencies are collaborating to develop Chouteau Island as a recreational complex to feature floodplain and grasslands restoration, additional trails, interpretive overlooks, picnic areas, camping areas and a visitors center near the entrance to the Old Chain of Rocks Bridge.

== See also ==
- Gabaret Island
- Mosenthein Island
