= Grace Stewart =

Grace Stewart may refer to:

- Grace Stewart (field hockey) (born 1997), Australian field hockey player
- Grace Anne Stewart (1893–1970), first woman to graduate in geology in Canada
- Grace Campbell Stewart (died 1863), British miniature painter
