= Pugnoides =

Pugnoides Temporal range: Devonian–Permian

Scientific classification
- Domain: Eukaryota
- Kingdom: Animalia
- Phylum: Brachiopoda
- Class: Rhynchonellata
- Order: Rhynchonellida
- Family: †Petasmariidae
- Genus: †Pugnoides; Weller, 1910

Species
- See text

Extinct genus of brachiopod

Pugnoides is an extinct genus of brachiopod belonging to the order Rhynchonellida and family Petasmariidae. Specimens have been found in Devonian to Permian beds in North America, Asia, Europe, western Australia, New Zealand,and New Zealand. The genus was particularly widespread in the Visean (Lower Mississippian).

== Description ==
Members of the genus are typically small to medium in size. The general shape of the shell is roughly circular to roughly triangular, and both valves are strongly convex in shape. The beak (the oldest portion of the valve closest to the hinge) is incurved rather than flat. The foramen (the opening through which the animal's pedicle or foot was extended) is large and oval in shape./

== Species ==
- P. mazhalaensis Jin and Shi 1979
- P. quinqueplecis Easton 1962
- P. ardivenus Waterhouse 1982
