= Mosenthein Island =

Island in the United States of America

Coordinates: 38°43′21″N 90°12′06″W

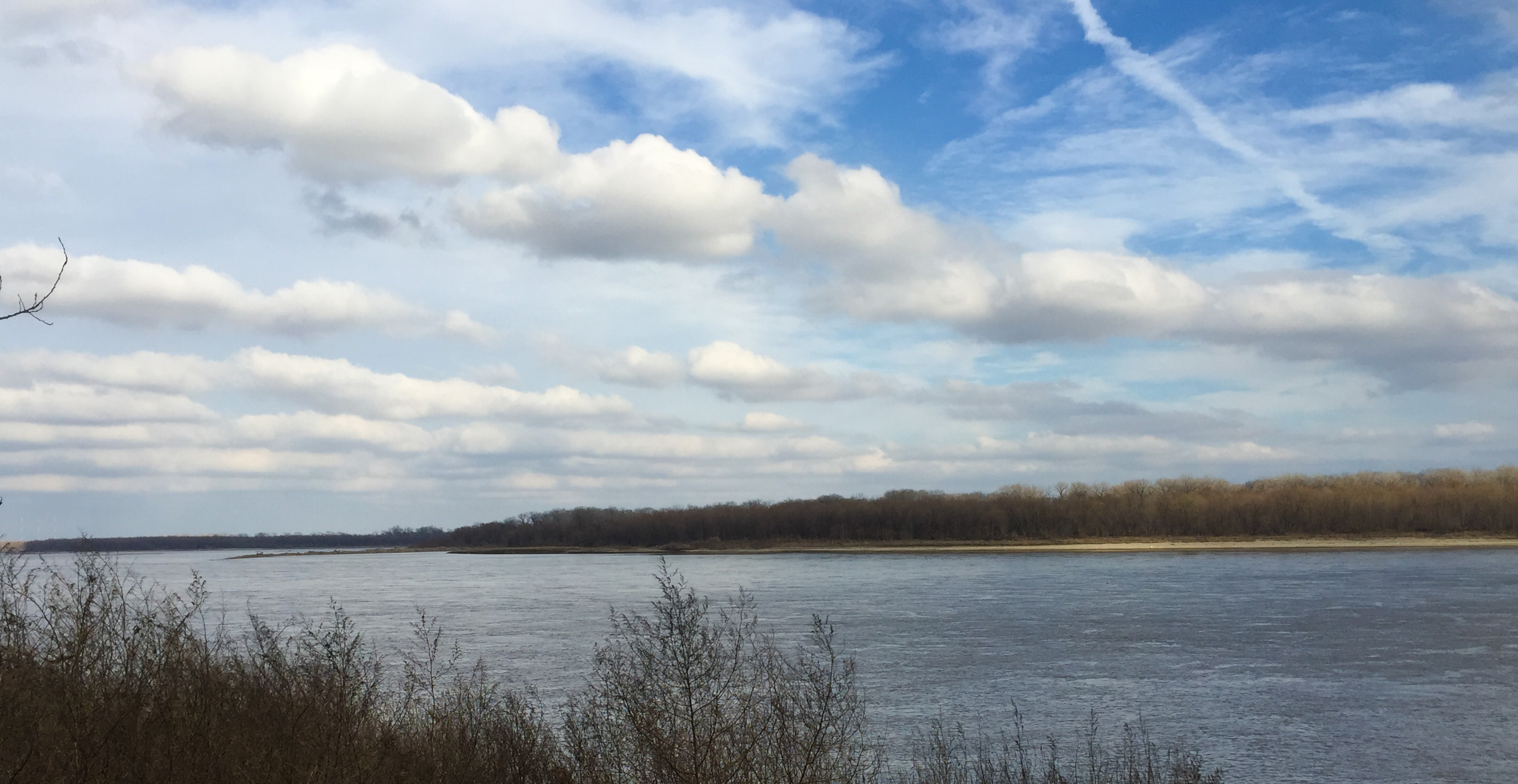
Mosenthein Island across the Mississippi River, as seen from the Missouri shore.

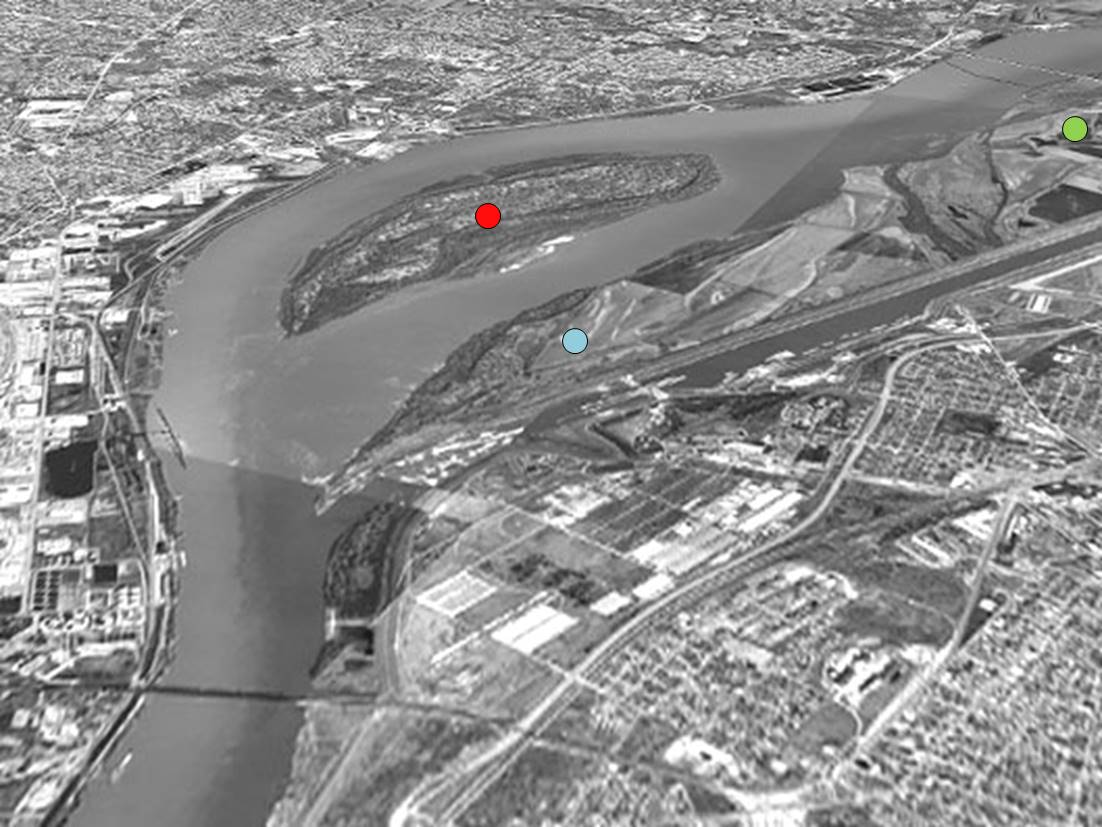
Aerial image showing Chouteau Island (green dot), Gabaret Island (blue dot), and Mosenthein Island (red dot)

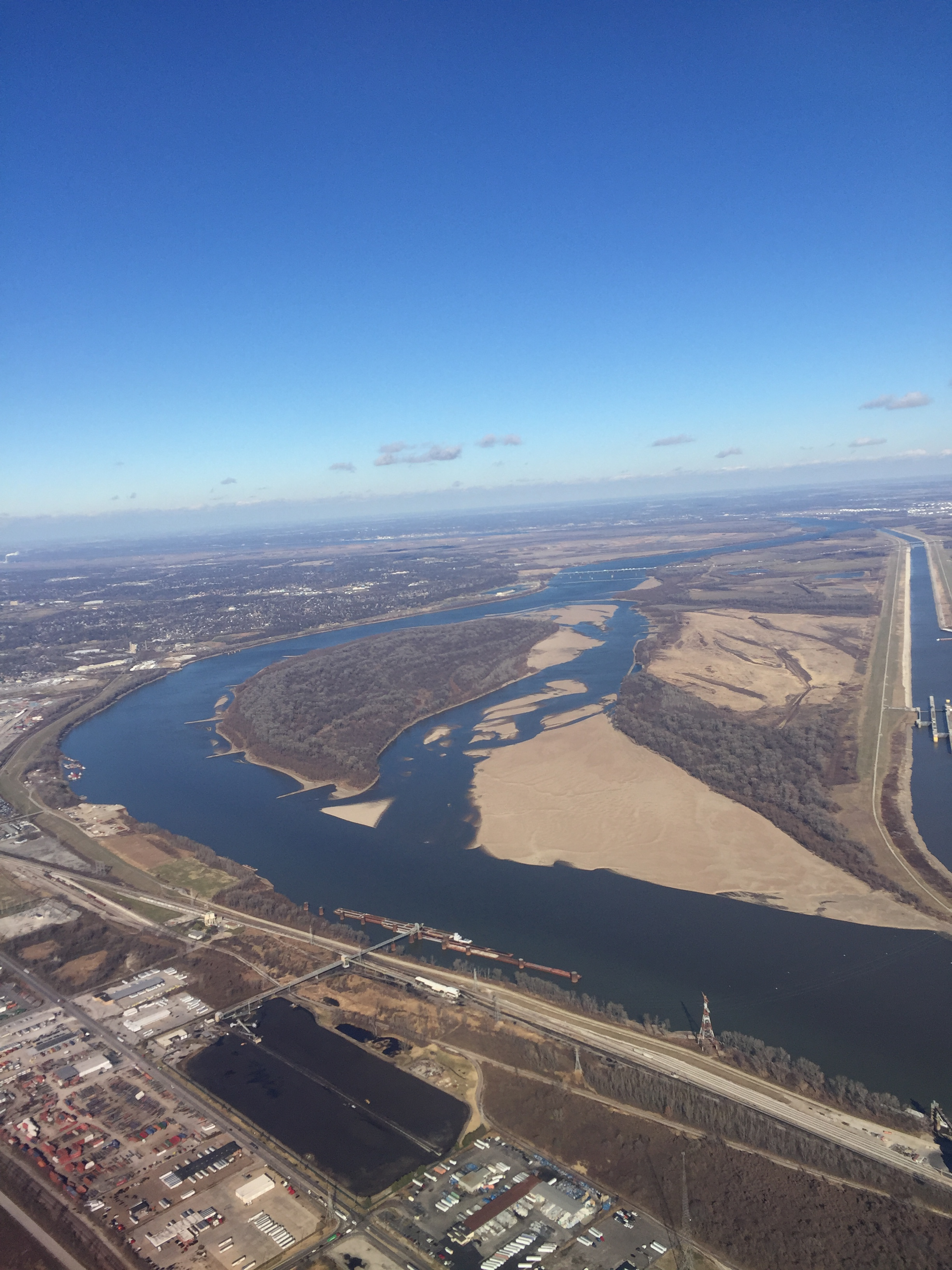
Another aerial view showing the three islands on the Mississippi River

Mosenthein Island, situated approximately eight miles (13 km) due north of the Gateway Arch in St. Louis, Missouri, and approximately one mile (1.6 km) south of the confluence of the Missouri River and Mississippi River, is one of a cluster of three islands: Chouteau Island, Gabaret Island, and Mosenthein Island. Mosenthein Island is 1,077 acres in area. The island is mainly bottomland forest. It is only accessible by boat. It is a popular spot to camp and canoe.
