= New Chain of Rocks Bridge =

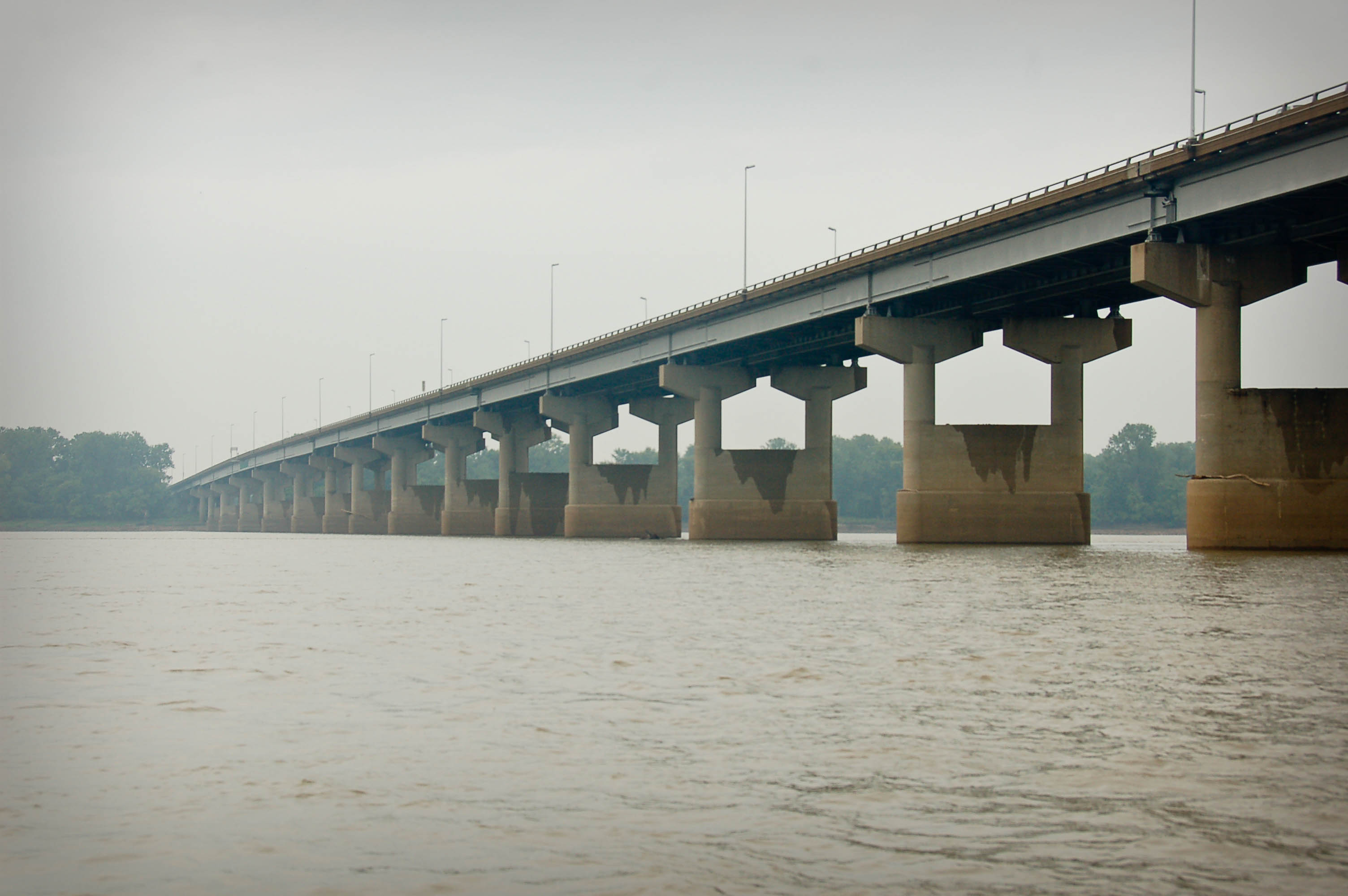
- New Chain of Rocks Bridge, September 2011
- Coordinates: 38°45′53″N 90°10′25″W
- Carries: Four lanes of I-270
- Crosses: Mississippi River
- Locale: Granite City, IL and Bellefontaine Neighbors, MO
- Other name: I-270 Mississippi River bridge
- Maintained by: Illinois Department of Transportation
- ID number: IL 060-0035

Characteristics
- Design: Girder
- Total length: 5,411.4 ft (1,649.4 m)
- Width: 54.1 ft (16.5 m)

History
- Opened: September 2, 1966; 59 years ago Replacement channel bridge: July 11, 2014; 11 years ago

Statistics
- Daily traffic: 51,000

Location
- Interactive map of New Chain of Rocks Bridge

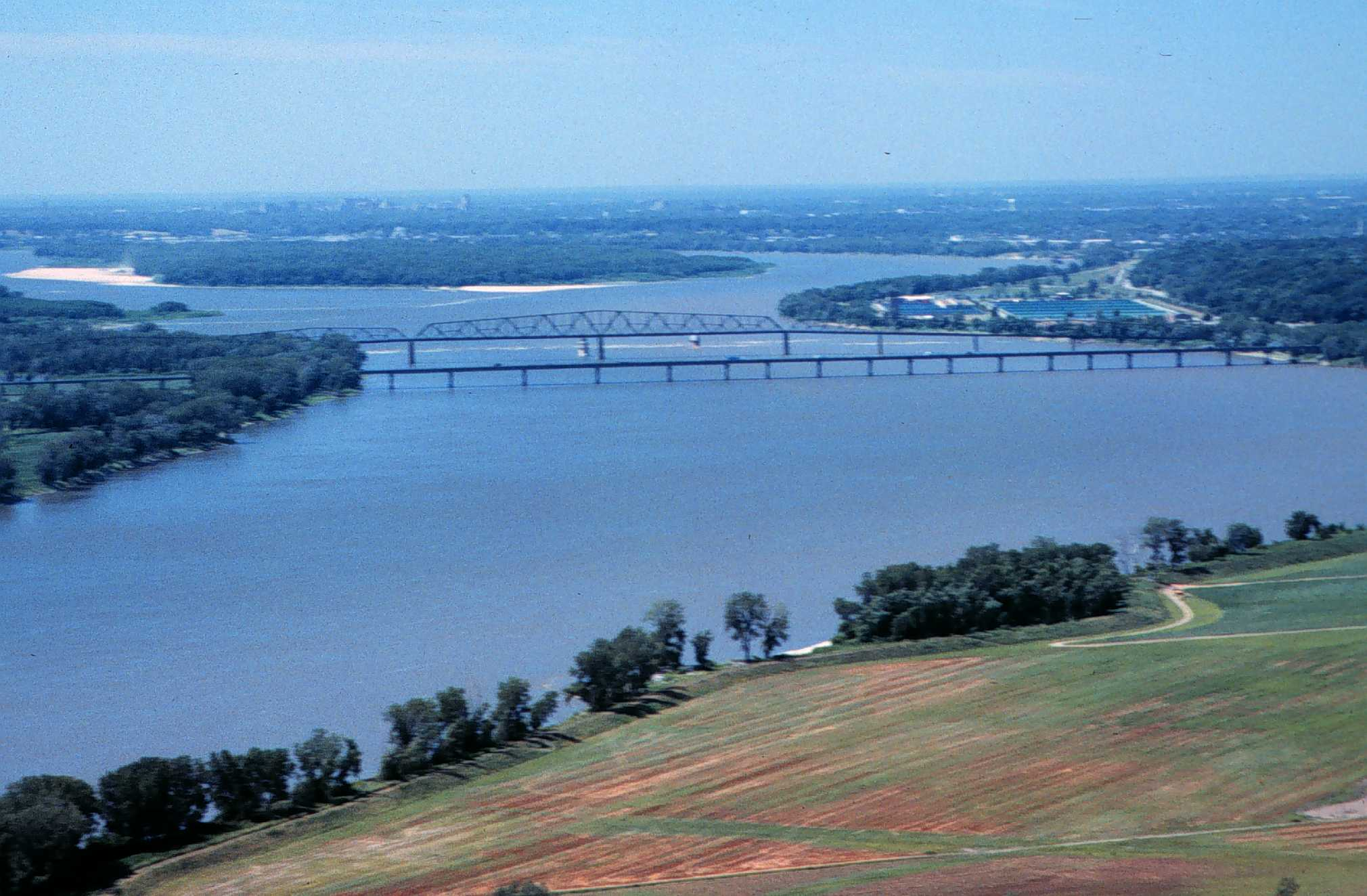
New bridge in foreground, old bridge background

The New Chain of Rocks Bridge is a pair of bridges across the Mississippi River on the north edge of St. Louis, Missouri. It was constructed in 1966 to bypass the Chain of Rocks Bridge immediately to the south. It originally carried traffic for Bypass US 66 and currently carries traffic for Interstate 270. The bridge opened to traffic on September 2, 1966.

The original Chain of Rocks Bridge was a narrow bridge with a 22 degree bend midway over the river. Reportedly, two tractor-trailers could not pass each other on that bridge. The Illinois Department of Transportation (IDOT) marks Historic Route 66 over the New Chain of Rocks Bridge (with a "Spur historic route" to the original), but it is only considered a way to make the route continuous.

== History ==
In 1959, proposals first surfaced of a new bridge just to the north of the existing bridge at Chain of Rocks. One of the major opponents to the proposal was Madison mayor Stephen Maeras, as his city owned the existing Chain of Rocks Bridge that was a toll bridge. The proposed 21 feet above the 1844 high-water mark also brought opponents asking the Corps of Engineers to reject the application.

The construction was riddled by various labor and political problems. A death threat to kill a construction supervisor surfaced in July 1965, and by November 1965 the contractor stopped work on the bridge due to the "many troubles". Meanwhile, as the rest of I-270 was open by then, the City of Madison continued to collect toll revenue from the old bridge, averaging $50,000 to $60,000 per month.

The state of Missouri, which was overseeing the construction project, would soon start an investigation as the project was several months behind schedule. The state decided on legal action against the City of Madison in regard to tolls on the old bridge by July 1966, and Madison suspended the tolls on August 2, 1966.

On September 2, 1966, at 1:45 pm (13:45), the bridge was opened to traffic. This moment marked the completion of I-270 in St. Louis (not counting the section that was still marked I-244), and was the first of three interstate highway bridges opened in the St. Louis area.

This opening could not come at a better time for the people in the nearby Alton area, as they were dealing a narrow bridge of their own at the time that had numerous problems and was facing another major closure due to repairs. As a result, any construction work or major accident on either bridge almost always made the Alton Telegraph (with the biggest stories making front page). In 1975, the Clark Bridge closed for major repairs for a six-month period, and traffic was detoured onto this bridge. Many locals refer to it as the I-270 Bridge, to differentiate it from the original Chain of Rocks Bridge, which still stands but is closed to vehicle traffic.

As the truck traffic from the I-70 corridor increased (I-70 thru truckers preferred the I-270 routing through St. Louis due to lower congestion and shorter distances), the Alton area used the 1975 detour as a rallying point in getting the Clark Bridge replaced. Although planning work was being done, there was no funding for that replacement. Meanwhile, the truck traffic was taking a toll on the Chain of Rocks Bridge over both the Mississippi River and Chain of Rocks Canal. Lane restrictions for expansion joint and pavement repairs on both structures was common during the 1980s and 1990s. The river bridge would soon be rated structurally deficient by 1991.

In 1993, the Mississippi River experienced major flooding during the Great Flood of 1993. North of St. Louis, all bridges from the McKinley Bridge up to the Keokuk Bridge were shut down due to flooding at one point or another. The I-270 bridge, despite having lower than normal clearance over the Mississippi River, remained open. The majority of the other bridges that were closed had flooded approaches, however, all of the approaches on I-270 were built on high ground and remained above water. This led to some of the worst traffic delays on the bridge during this time, especially during peak periods at the height of the floods.

On January 4, 1994, the Clark Bridge opened to traffic, giving the Chain of Rocks Bridge much needed relief. During the night of August 10, 1994, two pins supporting an expansion joint failed and caused a section on the Illinois end of the bridge to sink nearly 4 inches, causing 3 of the 4 lanes to close for emergency repairs. For the remainder of that month, various lanes would close due to emergency repairs and inspections and news regarding the emergency repairs frequently made headlines in the Alton Telegraph.

From June 1996 through December 1998, IDOT conducted a major bridge resurfacing project on both the river and canal bridges, with various expansion joints being replaced during this time. IDOT put an 8-6 width and legal weight restriction on the bridge, which forced the majority of trucks to take alternate routes during this time. Traffic would often clog during Friday afternoons while the construction went on. The weight and width restrictions would be lifted after the project concluded.

As traffic demands continue to increase, the lack of shoulders on both the canal and river bridges is starting to prove a safety hazard. The canal bridge would receive a functionally obsolete rating. In addition, with the bridge still being at 4 lanes of traffic, any issue that occurs can cause big problems. On December 8, 2010, a major tractor-trailer accident would close the bridge for 10 hours and paralyze traffic in the Metro-East during the morning peak periods.

=== Replacement bridge ===
On August 23, 2022, the Missouri and Illinois departments of transportation awarded contracts to begin construction on a replacement for the "New" Chain of Rocks Bridge and interchange at Riverview Drive. Construction began in the fall of 2022 and is expected to be complete by December 2026. The replacement bridge will include space for six 12-foot lanes and 10-foot shoulders.

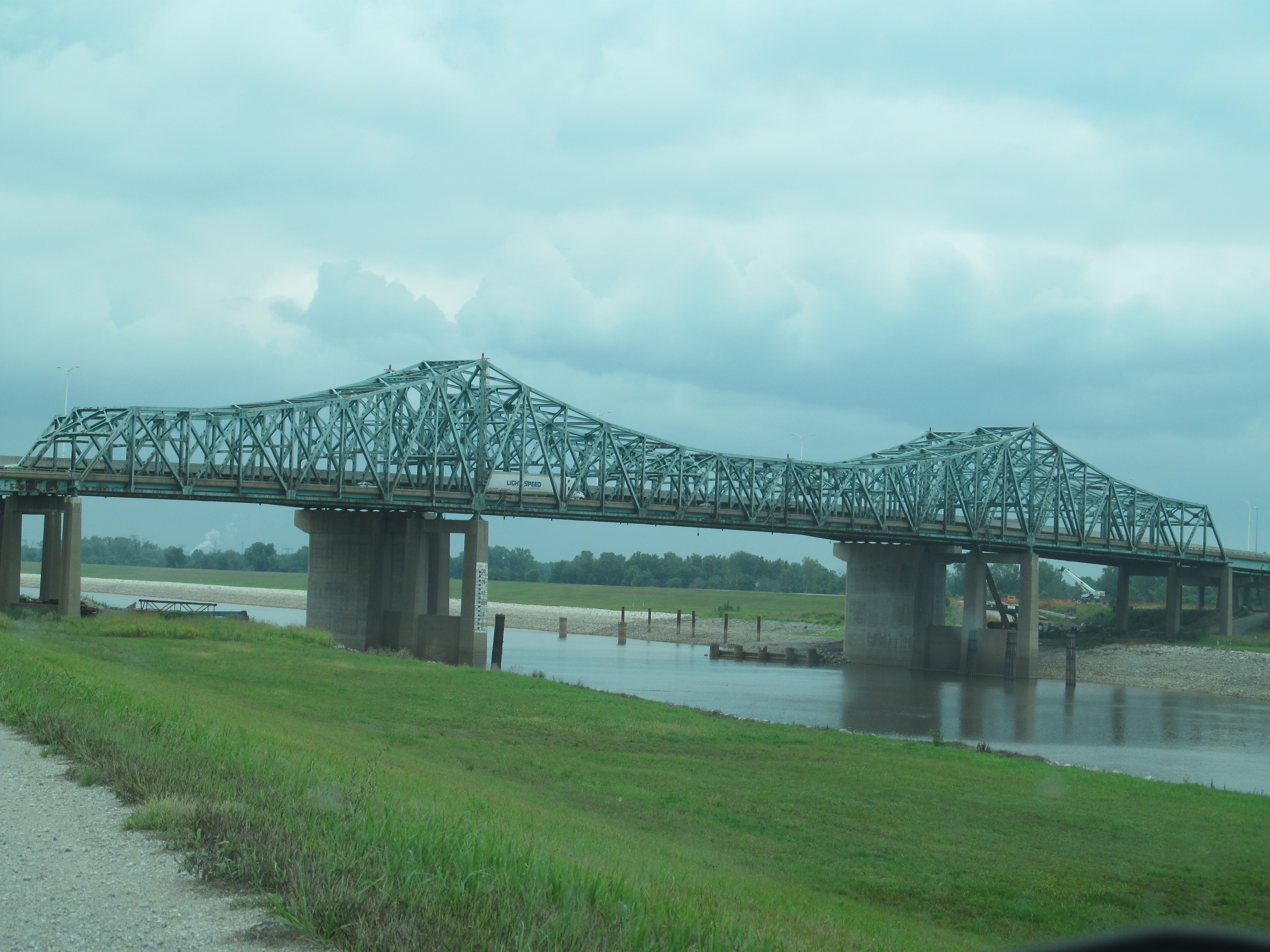
I-270 canal bridges used 1966–2014; imploded 2015

== Notes ==
- Until 1994, locals heavily used this crossing due to the constant problems of the Old Clark Bridge.
- On August 10, 1994, a broken beam caused the closure of 3 of the 4 lanes on the bridge for a few days. The lanes were reopened on August 14, 1994.
- The nearby Canal Bridges were replaced in the middle of 2014 after a nearly three-year-long construction project. The green truss bridges were imploded in phases on January 20, February 3, and February 19, 2015.
- The I-70 Corridor of the Future by FHWA is favoring the I-270 corridor in St. Louis, which includes this bridge.

== See also ==
- List of crossings of the Upper Mississippi River
