= St. Joe Formation =

Geologic formation or member in northern Arkansas

St. Joe Limestone Member
- Stratigraphic range: Mississippian
- Type: Member
- Unit of: Boone Formation
- Overlies: Chattanooga Shale
- Thickness: up to 100 ft.

Lithology
- Primary: Limestone
- Other: Chert

Location
- Region: Arkansas, Missouri, Oklahoma
- Country: United States

Type section
- Named for: St. Joe, Searcy County, Arkansas
- Named by: T.C. Hopkins

The St. Joe Formation or St. Joe Limestone Member is a geologic formation or member in northern Arkansas, southern Missouri and northeastern Oklahoma. It preserves fossils of the Mississippian subperiod including crinoids, brachiopods, bryozoa, conodonts, blastoids, ostracods and rugose coral.

== See also ==
- List of fossiliferous stratigraphic units in Arkansas
- Paleontology in Arkansas
