= Compton Limestone =

Geologic formation in Missouri, US

- Stratigraphic range: Mississippian
- Type: Formation
- Underlies: Northview Formation
- Overlies: Cotter Formation, Chattanooga Shale
- Thickness: 5 to 50 ft

Lithology
- Primary: Limestone
- Other: Shale

Location
- Region: Missouri (southwest): Springfield Plateau section of the Ozarks
- Country: United States

Type section
- Named for: Compton, Webster County, Missouri
- Named by: Raymond Cecil Moore

The Compton Limestone is a geologic formation in southwest Missouri. It preserves brachiopod and echinoderm fossils of the Mississippian subperiod. The Compton rests unconformably on the Cotter Dolomite of Ordovician age. The Compton was named for the community of Compton, Missouri, as the type sections were described for outcrops along the James River and its tributary the Compton Branch.

== See also ==
- List of fossiliferous stratigraphic units in Missouri
- Paleontology in Missouri
