= Gabaret Island =

Island in Madison County, Illinois, United States

Coordinates: 38°42′56″N 90°10′48″W

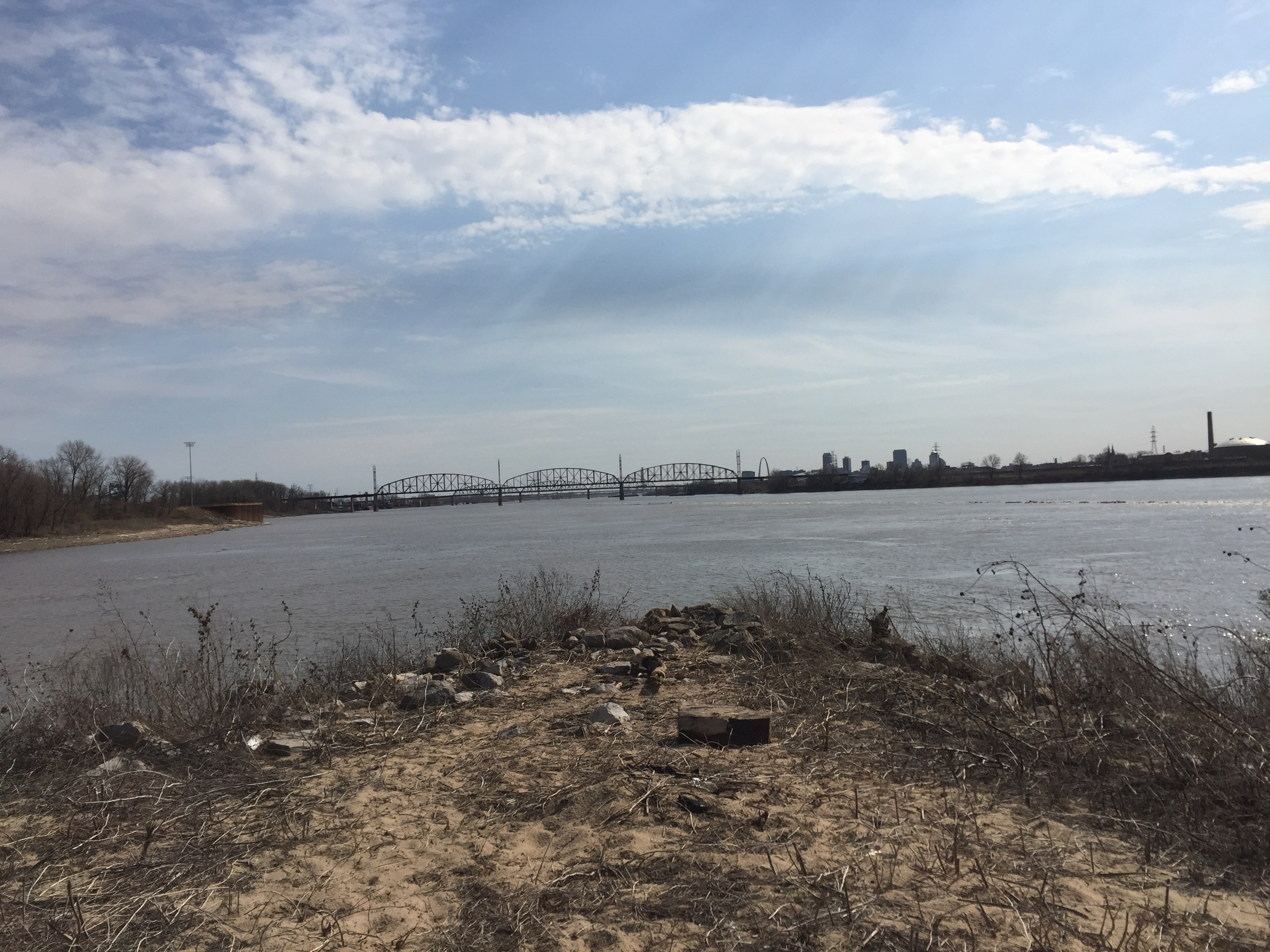
Gabaret Island, View from Southern Tip

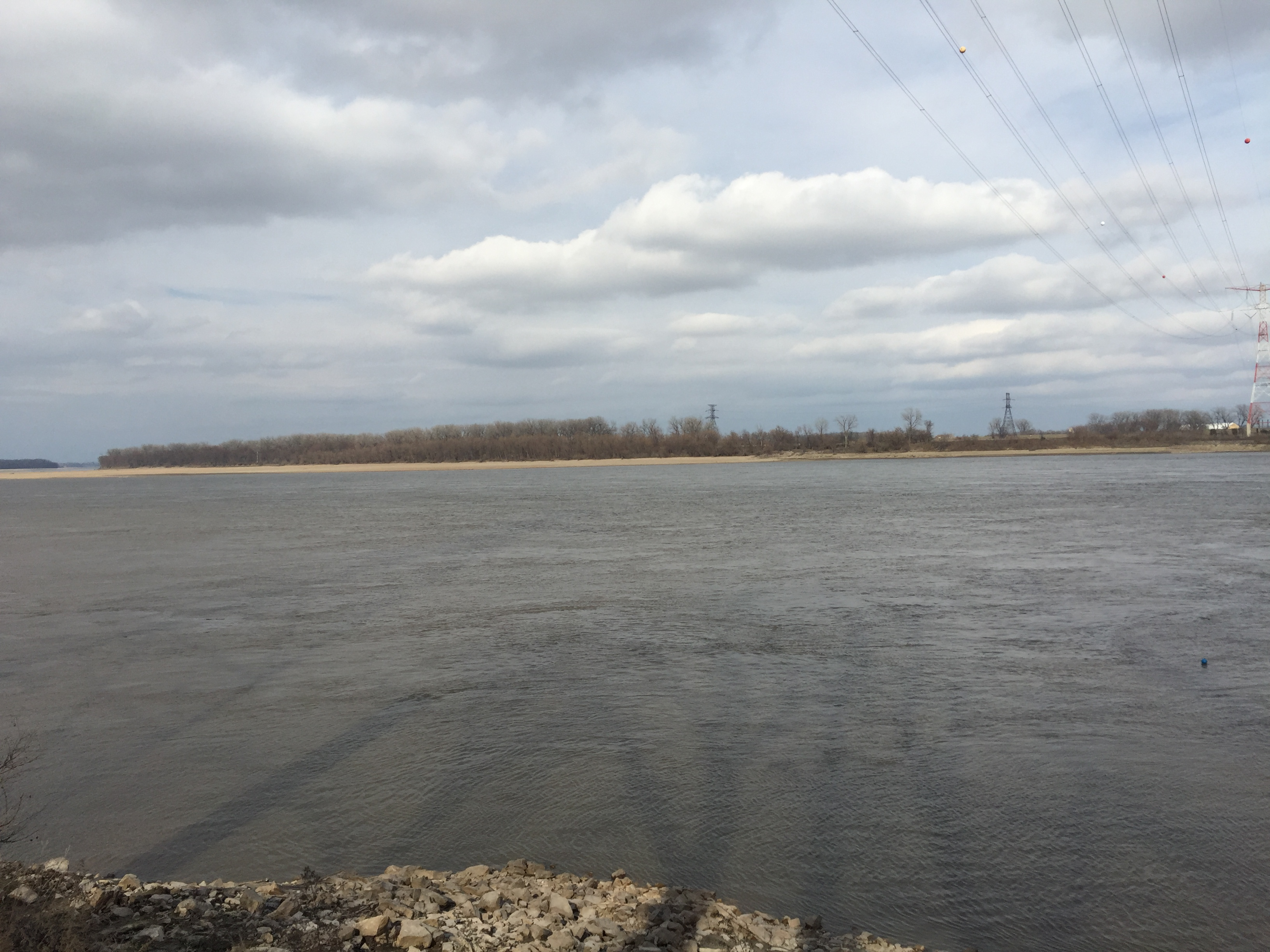
Southern portion of Gabaret Island as seen across the Mississippi River from the Missouri shore

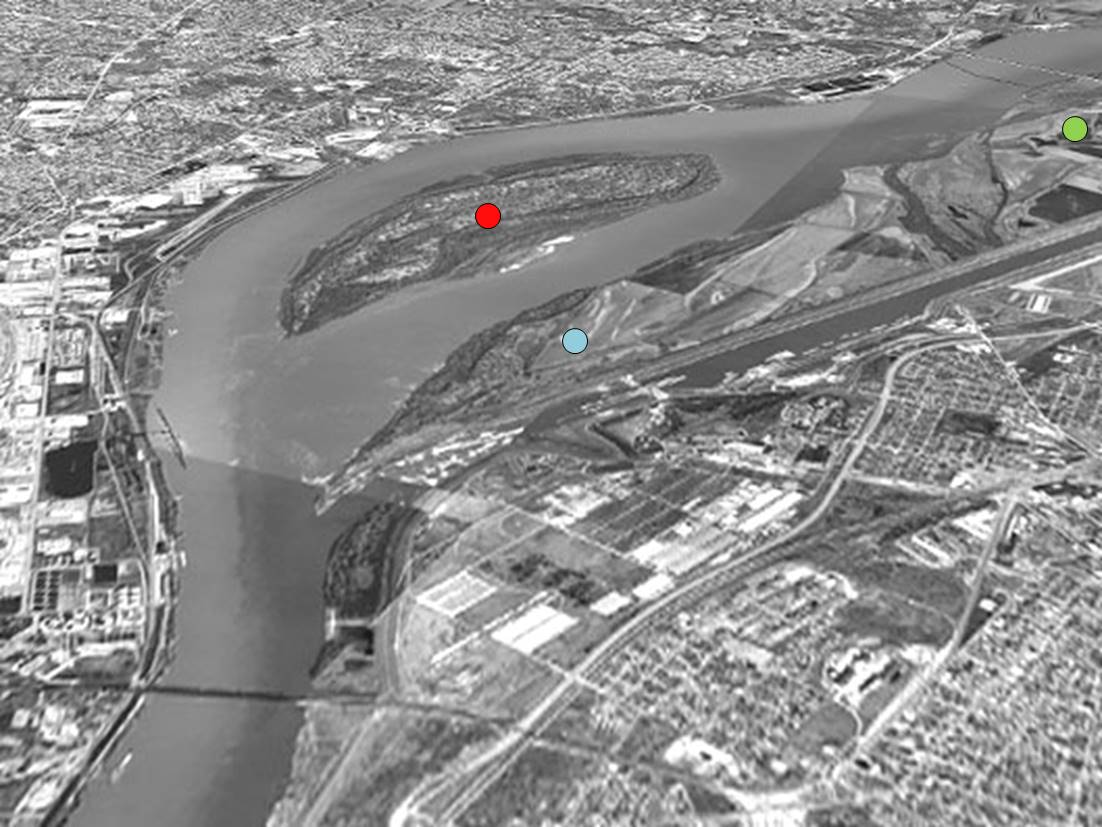
Aerial image showing Chouteau Island (green dot), Gabaret Island (blue dot), and Mosenthein Island (red dot)

Gabaret Island, also known as Cabaret Island, situated approximately eight miles (13 km) due north of the Gateway Arch in St. Louis, Missouri, and approximately one mile (1.6 km) south of the confluence of the Missouri River and Mississippi River, is one of a cluster of three islands: Chouteau Island, Gabaret Island, and Mosenthein Island. Gabaret Island is 1,300 acres in area. Due to land development, the island is continuous with its northern neighbor, Chouteau Island, but is separated by a slough (Gabaret Slough).

Lewis and Clark camped on Gabaret Island on December 11, 1803, prior to establishing Camp Dubois near Wood River, Illinois.
