= Fern Glen Formation =

Geologic formation in Missouri, U.S.

- Stratigraphic range: Mississippian Osagean
- Type: Formation
- Underlies: Burlington Limestone
- Overlies: Chouteau Group

Lithology
- Primary: Limestone
- Other: Shale, chert

Location
- Country: United States
- Extent: East central and southeastern Missouri, Illinois

Type section
- Named for: Fern Glen resort on the Meramec River
- Named by: Weller in 1906

The Fern Glen Formation is a geologic formation in eastern and southeastern Missouri. It preserves fossils dating back to the Osagean Series of the Mississippian subperiod.

The Fern Glen is richly fossiliferous with abundant crinoids, corals, brachiopods and bryozoa.

== See also ==
- List of fossiliferous stratigraphic units in Missouri
- Paleontology in Missouri
