= Compton, Missouri =

Historic community in the American state of Missouri

Coordinates: 37°14′01″N 93°02′13″W

Compton
- Unincorporated community
- Location in Missouri, United States
- Country: United States
- State: Missouri
- County: Webster
- Established: 1884
- Post office closed: 1906
- Time zone: UTC-6 (Central)
  - Summer (DST): UTC-5 (CDT)

Compton is a historic community in western Webster County, in the U.S. state of Missouri. The post office was located at different locations in the area. One site was located along the bank of the James River along Missouri Route B, but a second location is approximately three-quarters of a mile to the southeast above Compton Branch (a tributary of the James). This second location is within or adjacent to the Compton Hollow Conservation Area and about three miles south of Northview. The Compton Limestone geologic formation was named for the community, because the type sections defining the unit were located in the vicinity.

A post office called Compton was established in 1884, and remained in operation until 1906. The community has the name of John Compton, the original owner of the town site.
