= Chain of Rocks Lock =

Dam in Illinois, U.S.

Chain of Rocks Lock and Dam (Lock and Dam No. 27)
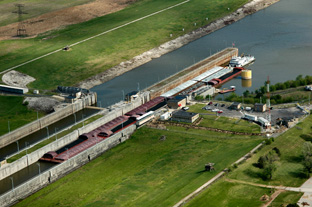
- Lock number 27
- Interactive map of Chain of Rocks Lock and Dam (Lock and Dam No. 27)
- Official name: Locks No. 27
- Country: United States
- Location: Venice Township, Madison County, Illinois
- Coordinates: 38°42′11″N 90°10′51″W
- Opening date: 1953
- Operators: U.S. Army Corps of Engineers, St. Louis District

Dam and spillways
- Impounds: Upper Mississippi River

Chain of Rocks Lock and Dam, also known as Locks No. 27, is a lock situated at the southern end of Chouteau Island near St. Louis, Missouri, on the Upper Mississippi River. Its associated dam is just downstream of the Chain of Rocks Bridge, and the lock is located over 3 miles (4.8 km) southeast on the Chain of Rocks canal. The canal and locks allow river traffic to bypass a portion of the river that is unnavigable in low water due to an anticlinal exposure of bedrock in the river—a "chain of rocks".

The 8.4-mile (13.5 km) canal, 1,200-foot (370 m) main lock, and 600-foot (180 m) auxiliary lock were built in the late 1940s and early 1950s to allow a by-pass of the Chain of Rocks lying in the main channel of the Mississippi River. This stretch of river in low water seasons was treacherous for commercial tow boats and barges, often requiring them to wait several days for the river to rise. The dam for lock 27 is atypical for the Mississippi, being a weir made of tons of rock laid in the Mississippi to create a small pool elevation upstream from the Chain of Rocks. The drop at Locks 27 can vary from a few feet to over a ten-foot drop depending on the river stage.

The Chain of Rocks Lock is operated by the St. Louis District of the U.S. Army Corps of Engineers. Locks No. 27 are the southernmost locks on the Mississippi River and they are the only Locks south of the confluence of the Mississippi River and Missouri River. As such, the Locks move more cargo than any other navigation structure on the Mississippi River.

== September 2012 shutdown ==
An accident caused the lock to be shut down on September 15, 2012. Over four dozen towboats, and over four hundred barges, were stranded when the lock was shut down. A large, rock-filled steel cell—used to help align barges prior to transiting the lock—split causing the channel to be blocked with rock. The cause of the incident was attributed to exceptionally low water levels. The steel cell has armored sections, to protect it from impacts and abrasion from the heavy barges. But the water had fallen so low that barges were impacting an unarmored portion of the shaft.

== Gallery ==
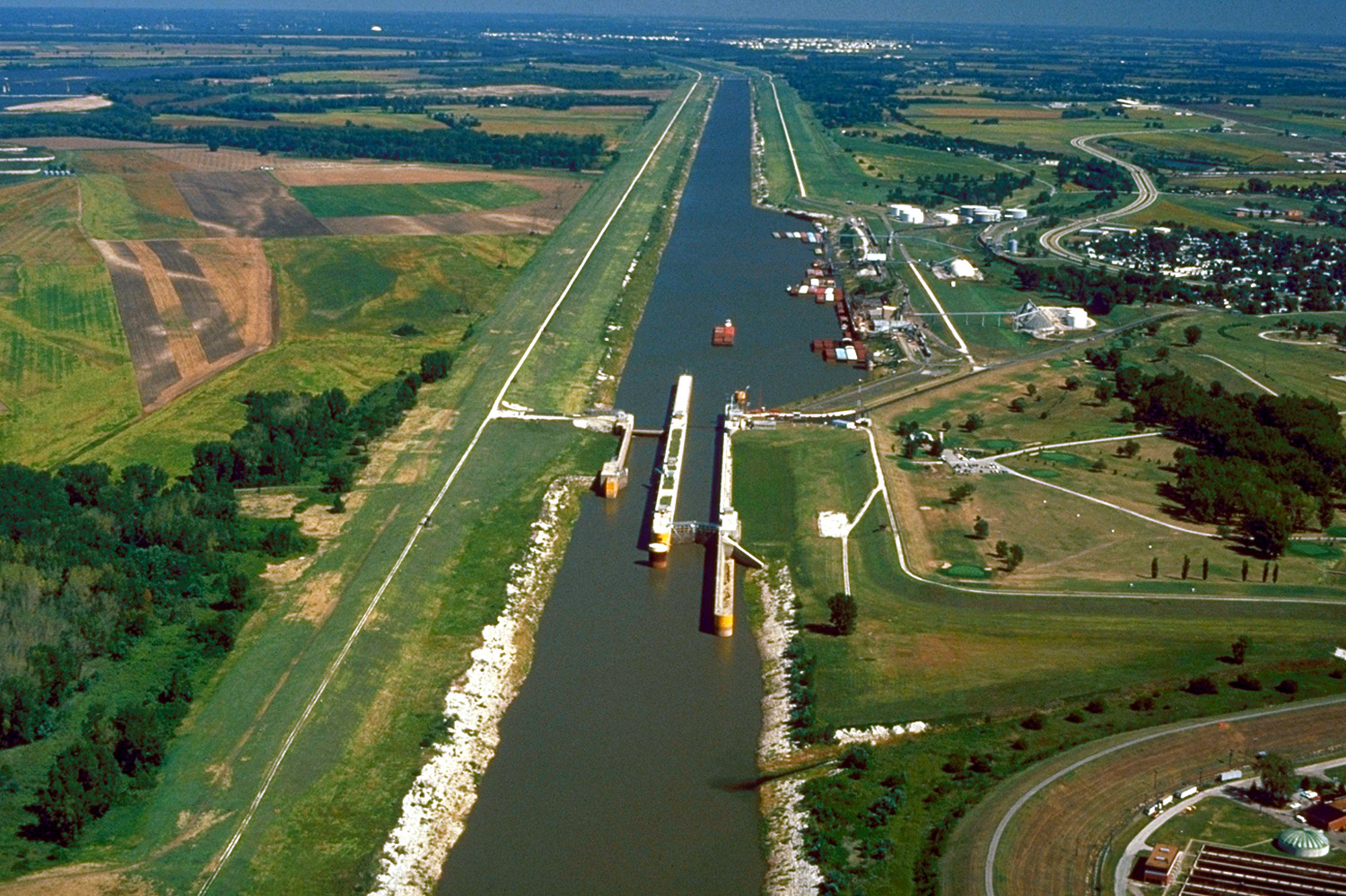
The Chain of Rocks Canal and Locks in Madison County, Illinois

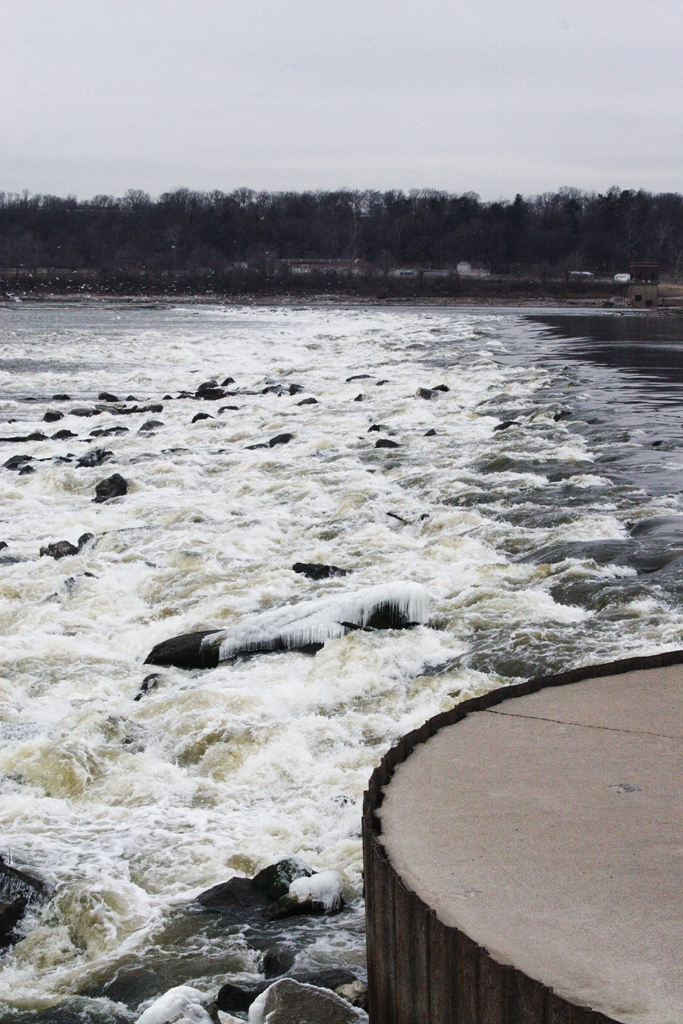
This low water dam across the Mississippi maintains a minimum pool level upstream of the locks.

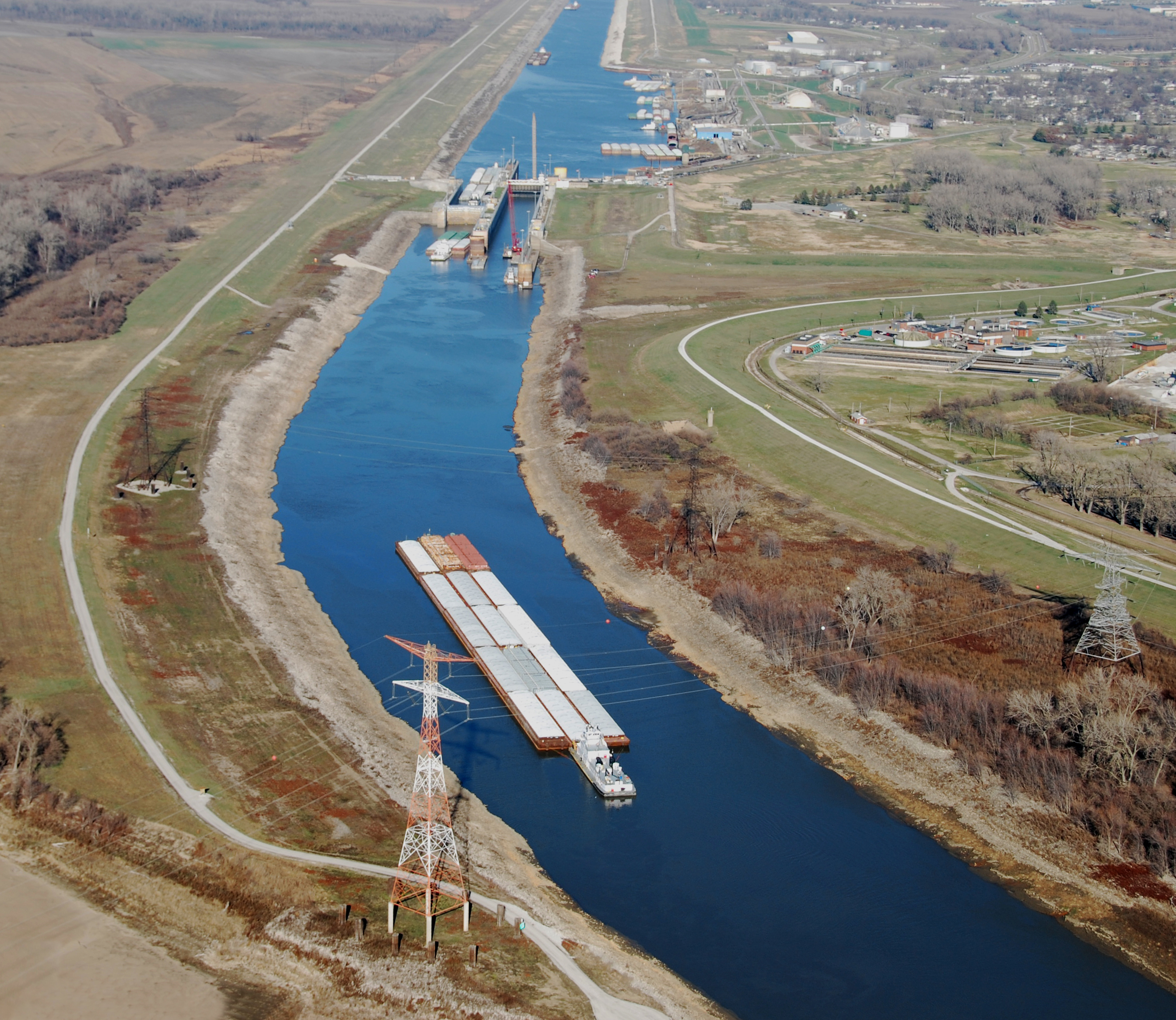
Chain of Rocks locks

Annual tonnage through lock

== See also ==
- New Chain of Rocks Bridge
