= Warsaw Formation =

Geologic formation in the United States

- Stratigraphic range: Mississippian
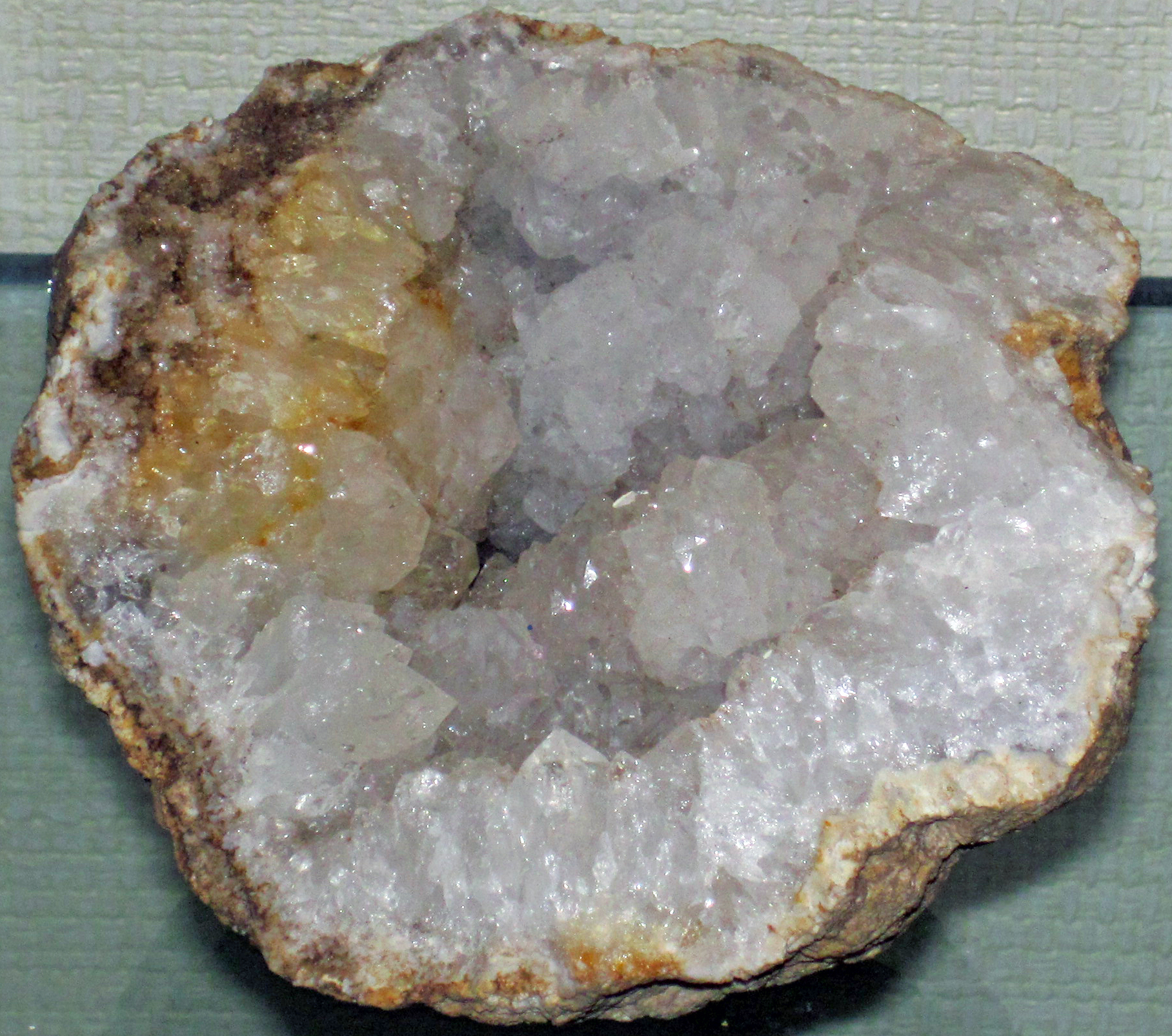
- Geode from the Warsaw Formation (Warsaw, Hancock County, Illinois)
- Type: Formation
- Underlies: Salem Formation
- Overlies: Keokuk Limestone

Location
- Region: Illinois, Iowa, Missouri
- Country: United States

Type section
- Named for: Warsaw, Hancock County, Illinois

The Warsaw Formation is a geologic formation in Illinois, Iowa and Missouri. It preserves fossils dating back to the Mississippian subperiod. Brachiopod, bryozoan, and crinoid fossils are common, particularly the bryozoan Archimedes.

== See also ==
- List of fossiliferous stratigraphic units in Illinois
- List of fossiliferous stratigraphic units in Iowa
- List of fossiliferous stratigraphic units in Missouri
