= Madison, Illinois =

- City
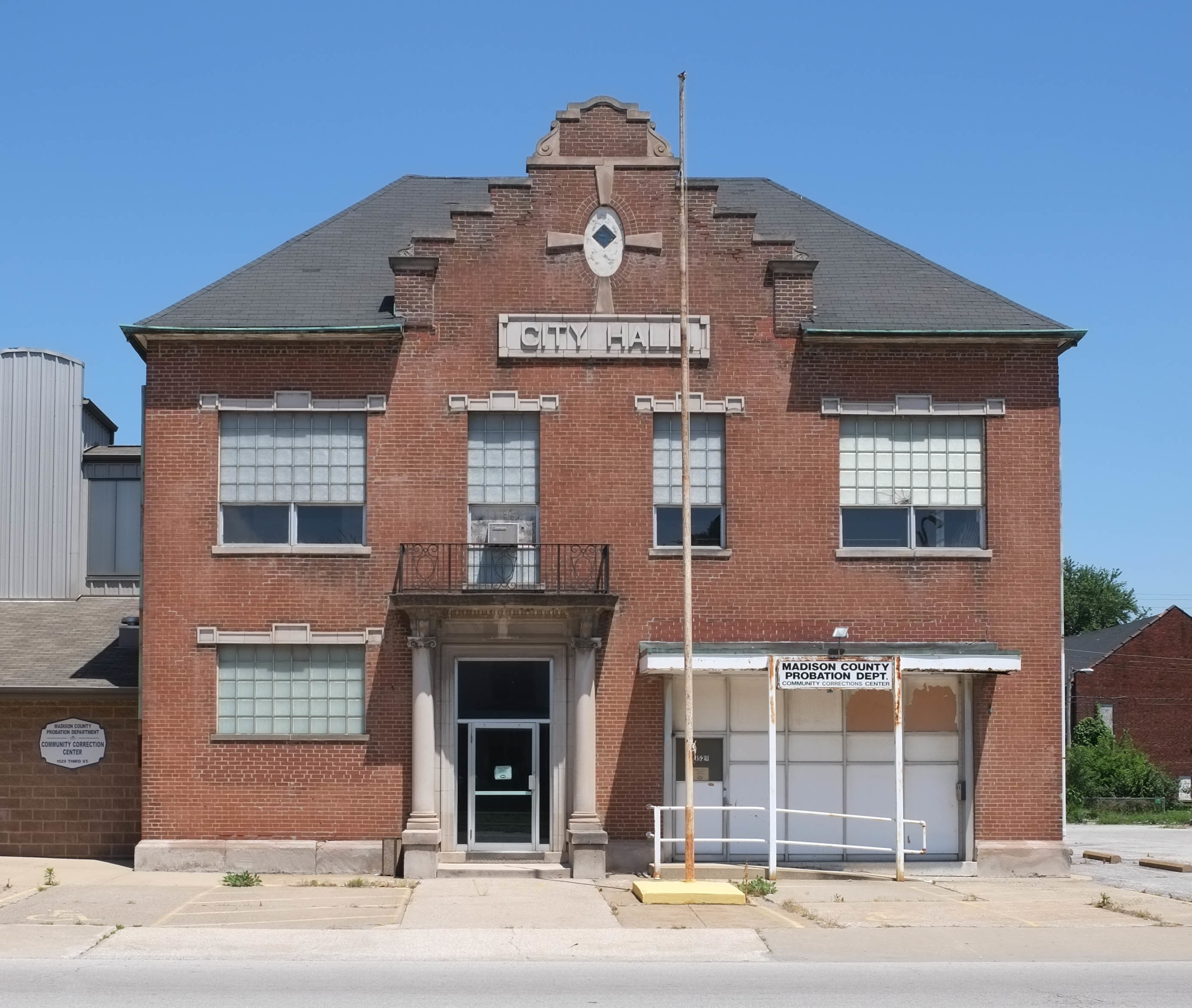
- City Hall

- Location in Madison County, Illinois
- Coordinates: 38°43′30″N 90°08′40″W
- Country: United States
- State: Illinois
- Counties: Madison, St. Clair
- Townships: Venice, Nameoki, Chouteau, Canteen, Stites

Area
  - Total: 17.88 sq mi (46.32 km^{2})
  - Land: 14.15 sq mi (36.64 km^{2})
  - Water: 3.74 sq mi (9.68 km^{2})
- Elevation: 413 ft (126 m)

Population (2020)
  - Total: 3,171
  - Density: 224.2/sq mi (86.56/km^{2})
- Time zone: UTC−6 (CST)
  - Summer (DST): UTC−5 (CDT)
- ZIP codes: 62060 (Madison); 62040 (Granite City); 62048 (Hartford); 62201 (East St. Louis)
- Area code: 618
- FIPS code: 17-45993
- GNIS feature ID: 2395806
- Website: cityofmadisonil.com

Madison is a city in Madison and St. Clair counties in the U.S. state of Illinois. It is also a suburb of Greater St. Louis. The population was 3,171 at the 2020 census, down from 3,891 in 2010. It is home to World Wide Technology Raceway at Gateway and the first Bulgarian Orthodox church in the United States.

== History ==
Madison was founded in 1820. There have been three villages named Madison.

== Geography ==
Madison is located in southwestern Madison County. The central city area is bordered by Granite City to the north and Venice to the southwest. However, the Madison city limits now extend 3 miles (5 km) south, 4 miles (6 km) east, and 8 miles (13 km) north of the city center, so that it is also bordered by Hartford to the extreme north, Pontoon Beach to the east, Fairmont City to the southeast, and Brooklyn to the southwest. The Mississippi River forms the western boundary of Madison north of Venice, with St. Louis, Missouri, across the river.

Illinois Route 203 passes through the center of Madison as MC Cambridge Avenue and Edwardsville Road, leading north into Granite City and south to Interstates 55 and 70 at their Exit 4 in the southernmost part of town. Illinois Route 3 (Cedar Street) crosses the western part of Madison, leading south into Venice before crossing the Mississippi into St. Louis, and north through Granite City to Hartford.

According to the 2021 census gazetteer files, Madison has a total area of 17.93 square miles (46.44 km^{2}), of which 14.19 square miles (36.75 km^{2}) (or 79.14%) is land and 3.74 square miles (9.69 km^{2}) (or 20.86%) is water.

== Demographics ==
Historical population
Census	Pop.	Note	%±
1900	1,979		—
1910	5,046		155.0%
1920	4,996		−1.0%
1930	7,661		53.3%
1940	7,782		1.6%
1950	7,963		2.3%
1960	6,861		−13.8%
1970	7,042		2.6%
1980	5,301		−24.7%
1990	4,629		−12.7%
2000	4,545		−1.8%
2010	3,891		−14.4%
2020	3,171		−18.5%
U.S. Decennial Census

As of the 2020 census there were 3,171 people, 1,593 households, and 861 families residing in the city. The population density was 176.90 inhabitants per square mile (68.30/km^{2}). There were 1,613 housing units at an average density of 89.99 per square mile (34.75/km^{2}), of which 17.2% were vacant. The homeowner vacancy rate was 2.5% and the rental vacancy rate was 9.3%. The racial makeup of the city was 28.10% White, 63.48% African American, 0.44% Native American, 0.44% Asian, 0.03% Pacific Islander, 2.78% from other races, and 4.73% from two or more races. Hispanic or Latino of any race were 5.68% of the population.

There were 1,593 households, out of which 25.9% had children under the age of 18 living with them, 16.70% were married couples living together, 34.53% had a female householder with no husband present, and 45.95% were non-families. 36.97% of all households were made up of individuals, and 12.05% had someone living alone who was 65 years of age or older. The average household size was 2.29 and the average family size was 1.82.

The city's age distribution consisted of 15.2% under the age of 18, 3.4% from 18 to 24, 31.1% from 25 to 44, 34.5% from 45 to 64, and 15.8% who were 65 years of age or older. The median age was 45.8 years. For every 100 females, there were 74.7 males. For every 100 females age 18 and over, there were 77.5 males.

The median income for a household in the city was $30,592, and the median income for a family was $35,103. Males had a median income of $38,838 versus $21,055 for females. The per capita income for the city was $19,262. About 27.4% of families and 26.6% of the population were below the poverty line, including 18.8% of those under age 18 and 15.0% of those age 65 or over.

Madison city, Illinois – Racial and ethnic composition Note: the US Census treats Hispanic/Latino as an ethnic category. This table excludes Latinos from the racial categories and assigns them to a separate category. Hispanics/Latinos may be of any race.
Race / Ethnicity (NH = Non-Hispanic)	Pop 2000	Pop 2010	Pop 2020	% 2000	% 2010	% 2020
White alone (NH)	2,478	1,511	854	54.52%	38.83%	26.93%
Black or African American alone (NH)	1,906	2,153	2,001	41.94%	55.33%	63.10%
Native American or Alaska Native alone (NH)	13	9	13	0.29%	0.23%	0.41%
Asian alone (NH)	5	5	14	0.11%	0.13%	0.44%
Native Hawaiian or Pacific Islander alone (NH)	1	1	1	0.02%	0.03%	0.03%
Other race alone (NH)	5	0	5	0.11%	0.00%	0.16%
Mixed race or Multiracial (NH)	48	74	103	1.06%	1.90%	3.25%
Hispanic or Latino (any race)	89	138	180	1.96%	3.55%	5.68%
Total	4,545	3,891	3,171	100.00%	100.00%	100.00%

== National Register of Historic Places ==
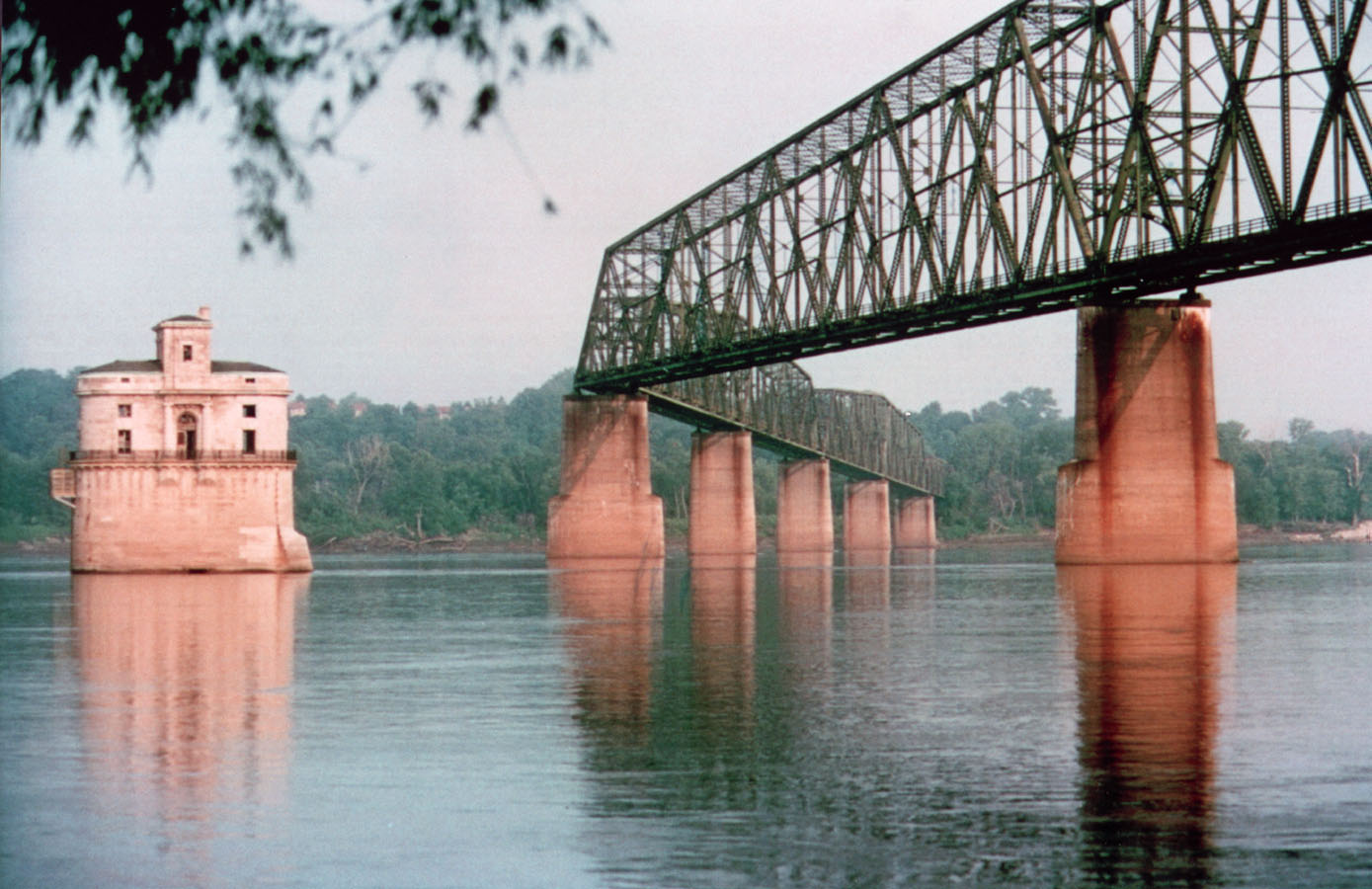
Chain of Rocks Bridge

- Chain of Rocks Bridge over the Mississippi River

== Transportation ==
Amtrak's Texas Eagle as well as its Lincoln Service pass through Madison, but don't stop in the small city. A regional bus service is provided for the community.

== Notable people ==
- George Becker, president of United Steelworkers 1993–2001
- Donnie Freeman, basketball player at Illinois and in ABA and NBA
- Sam Harshany, catcher for the St. Louis Browns
