= Venice, Illinois =

- City
- Location in Madison County, Illinois
- Coordinates: 38°40′19″N 90°10′09″W
- Country: United States
- State: Illinois
- County: Madison
- Township: Venice

Area
  - Total: 1.85 sq mi (4.79 km^{2})
  - Land: 1.85 sq mi (4.79 km^{2})
  - Water: 0 sq mi (0.00 km^{2})
- Elevation: 410 ft (120 m)

Population (2020)
  - Total: 1,498
  - Density: 810.4/sq mi (312.89/km^{2})
- Time zone: UTC-6 (CST)
  - Summer (DST): UTC-5 (CDT)
- ZIP codes: 62090 (Venice); 62060 (Madison)
- Area code: 618
- FIPS code: 17-77473
- GNIS feature ID: 2397123

Venice is a city in Madison County, Illinois, United States. The population was 1,498 at the 2020 census, down from 1,890 in 2010.

== History ==
Venice was platted in 1841.

== Geography ==
Venice is located in the southwest corner of Madison County and is bordered to the north and east by the city of Madison, to the south by the city of Brooklyn in St. Clair County, and to the west by the Mississippi River, across which is the city of St. Louis, Missouri.

According to the 2021 census gazetteer files, Venice has a total area of 1.85 square miles (4.79 km^{2}), of which 1.85 square miles (4.79 km^{2}) (or 99.89%) is land and 0.00 square miles (0.00 km^{2}) (or 0.11%) is water.

Illinois Route 3 passes through the west side of Venice, leading north 19 miles (31 km) to Alton and south 4 miles (6 km) to East St. Louis. The McKinley Bridge crosses the Mississippi River from Route 3 in Venice to Interstate 70 in St. Louis.

== Demographics ==
Historical population
Census	Pop.	Note	%±
1880	612		—
1890	932		52.3%
1900	2,450		162.9%
1910	3,718		51.8%
1920	3,895		4.8%
1930	5,362		37.7%
1940	5,454		1.7%
1950	6,226		14.2%
1960	5,380		−13.6%
1970	4,680		−13.0%
1980	3,480		−25.6%
1990	3,571		2.6%
2000	2,528		−29.2%
2010	1,890		−25.2%
2020	1,498		−20.7%
U.S. Decennial Census

As of the 2020 census there were 1,498 people, 849 households, and 535 families residing in the city. The population density was 809.29 inhabitants per square mile (312.47/km^{2}). There were 790 housing units at an average density of 426.80 per square mile (164.79/km^{2}), of which 19.4% were vacant. The homeowner vacancy rate was 1.4% and the rental vacancy rate was 8.8%. The racial makeup of the city was 2.74% White, 94.93% African American, 0.13% Native American, 0.07% Asian, 0.00% Pacific Islander, 0.07% from other races, and 2.07% from two or more races. Hispanic or Latino of any race were 0.67% of the population.

There were 849 households, out of which 26.0% had children under the age of 18 living with them, 21.55% were married couples living together, 34.16% had a female householder with no husband present, and 36.98% were non-families. 31.33% of all households were made up of individuals, and 13.66% had someone living alone who was 65 years of age or older. The average household size was 2.95 and the average family size was 2.40.

The city's age distribution consisted of 17.8% under the age of 18, 9.8% from 18 to 24, 29.4% from 25 to 44, 23.3% from 45 to 64, and 19.8% who were 65 years of age or older. The median age was 40.4 years. For every 100 females, there were 76.5 males. For every 100 females age 18 and over, there were 70.1 males.

The median income for a household in the city was $28,681, and the median income for a family was $26,902. Males had a median income of $21,250 versus $20,875 for females. The per capita income for the city was $18,348. About 41.9% of families and 40.5% of the population were below the poverty line, including 49.1% of those under age 18 and 22.8% of those age 65 or over.

Venice, Illinois – Racial and ethnic composition Note: the US Census treats Hispanic/Latino as an ethnic category. This table excludes Latinos from the racial categories and assigns them to a separate category. Hispanics/Latinos may be of any race.
Race / Ethnicity (NH = Non-Hispanic)	Pop 2000	Pop 2010	Pop 2020	% 2000	% 2010	% 2020
White alone (NH)	136	61	39	5.38%	3.23%	2.60%
Black or African American alone (NH)	2,352	1,768	1,421	93.04%	93.54%	94.86%
Native American or Alaska Native alone (NH)	6	3	2	0.24%	0.16%	0.13%
Asian alone (NH)	1	2	0	0.04%	0.11%	0.00%
Native Hawaiian or Pacific Islander alone (NH)	0	0	0	0.00%	0.00%	0.00%
Other race alone (NH)	0	0	0	0.00%	0.00%	0.00%
Mixed race or Multiracial (NH)	14	24	26	0.55%	1.27%	1.74%
Hispanic or Latino (any race)	19	32	10	0.75%	1.69%	0.67%
Total	2,528	1,890	1,498	100.00%	100.00%	100.00%

== Notable person ==
- Ted Savage, outfielder for eight Major League Baseball teams, was born in Venice.
