= Chain of Rocks Bridge =

Footbridge in St. Louis, Missouri, US

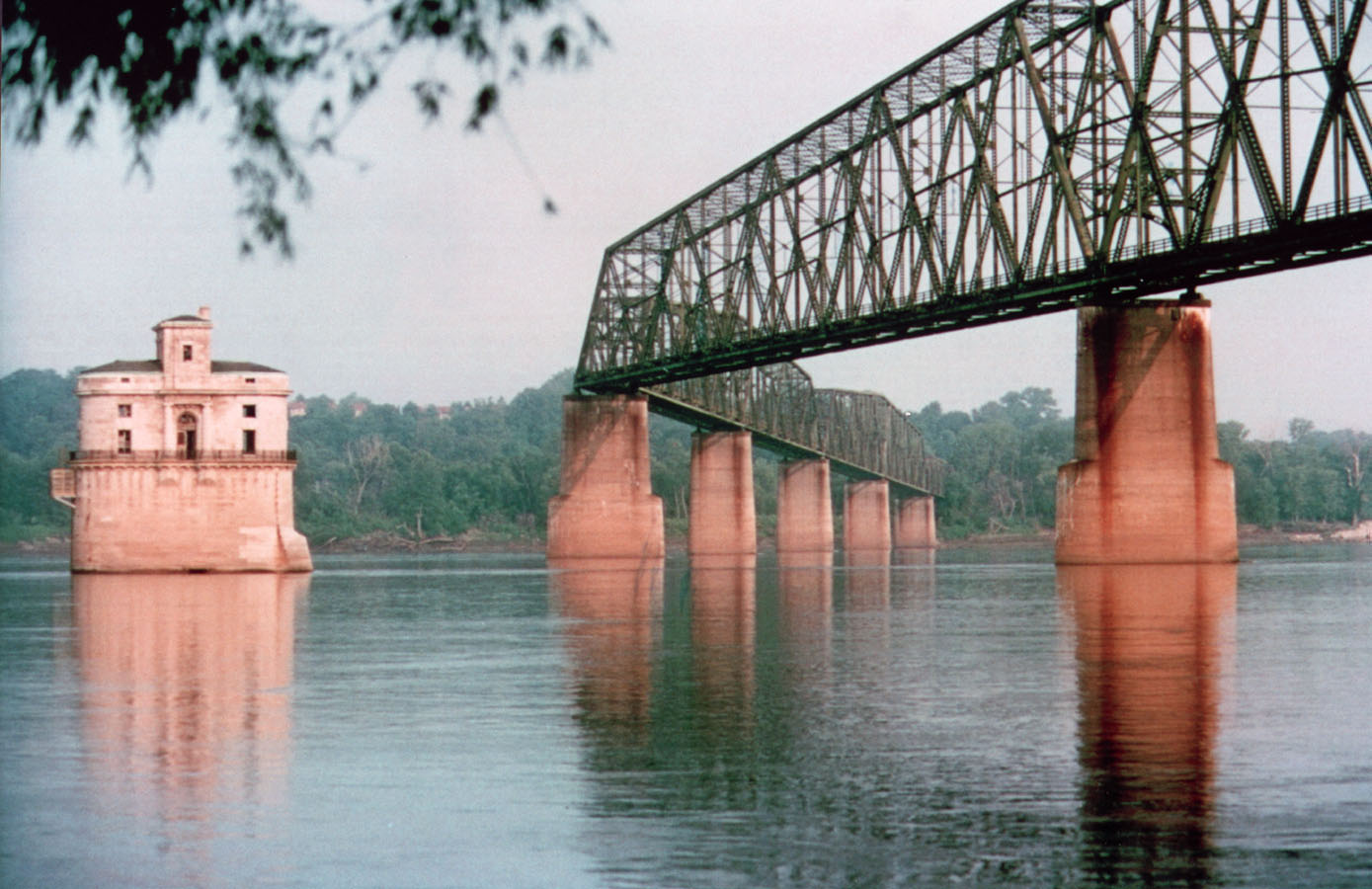
- Coordinates: 38°45′38″N 90°10′35″W
- Carries: Pedestrians and bicycles (1998–present)
- Crosses: Mississippi River
- Locale: St. Louis, Missouri / Madison, Illinois
- Maintained by: Trailnet

Characteristics
- Design: Cantilever through-truss
- Total length: 5,353 feet (1,632 m)
- Width: 24 feet (7 m)
- Longest span: 700 feet (213 m)

History
- Opened: 1929; 97 years ago
- Closed: 1970; 56 years ago (vehicle traffic)
- Chain of Rocks Bridge
- U.S. National Register of Historic Places
- Location within Illinois Location within the United States
- Location: West Chain of Rocks Rd., Madison, Illinois
- Area: 12.6 acres (5.10 ha)
- Built: 1929; 97 years ago
- Architect: Brown, Baxter L.; et al.
- Architectural style: Warren Truss
- MPS: Route 66 through Illinois MPS
- NRHP reference No.: 06001091
- Added to NRHP: December 1, 2006; 19 years ago

Location
- Interactive map of Chain of Rocks Bridge

The Chain of Rocks Bridge spans the Mississippi River on the north edge of St. Louis, Missouri, United States. The eastern end of the bridge is on Chouteau Island (part of Madison, Illinois), while the western end is on the Missouri shoreline. Constructed in 1929, the bridge has an unusual 22-degree bend occurring at the middle of the crossing, which was found to be necessary during construction due to both the presence of a water intake and the inability of parts of the bedrock of the river to carry the weight of the bridge.

Originally a motor route, the bridge was for a time the route used by U.S. Route 66 (US 66) to cross over the Mississippi, but the bridge now carries only walking and biking trails over the river; the New Chain of Rocks Bridge carries vehicular traffic to the north.

The old route to the bridge is now called Chain of Rocks Road and ends near Roman Road. Parking is available at the start of the now-pedestrian route. The bridge was added to the National Register of Historic Places in 2006.

== Name ==
The bridge's name comes from a large shoal, or rocky rapids, called the Chain of Rocks, which made that stretch of the Mississippi extremely dangerous to navigate. Because of a low-water dam built by the Army Corps of Engineers in the 1960s, little of the Chain of Rocks is visible today except during extreme low water conditions. After 1940, only a single impediment prevented the maintenance of a safe and reliable 9-foot (2.7 m) navigation channel on the Mississippi River from St. Paul, Minnesota, to New Orleans.

This impediment, known as the Chain of Rocks Reach, was a 17-mile (27 km) series of rock ledges that began just north of St. Louis and was extremely difficult and dangerous to navigate. In the late 1940s and early 1950s the U.S. Army Corps of Engineers built a 8.4-mile-long (13.5 km) canal to bypass this treacherous reach. To ensure adequate depths in the pool below the old Lock and Dam 26, a non-movable, low water dam was constructed just downstream of the old bridge and a lock was installed at the south end of the canal. Known respectively as Dam No. 27, also called Chain of Rocks Dam, and Locks No. 27, or Chain of Rocks Lock.

== History ==
The area was chosen as a site for the St. Louis waterworks in 1865, with construction beginning in 1887, and the water plant opened in 1894. A filter plant was added in 1915, which at the time of its construction was the largest filter plant in the world. The Chain of Rocks Bridge was privately built as a toll bridge in 1929 at a cost of $3 million and later turned over to the city of Madison, Illinois, the current owner of the bridge. Though engineers predicted ten fatalities during the creation of the bridge, only one worker was killed. In the late 1930s, Bypass US 66 was designated over this bridge and around the northern and western parts of St. Louis to avoid the downtown area (City US 66 continued to cross the Mississippi River over the MacArthur Bridge). On August 2, 1966, the tolls were suspended by the City of Madison, which marked an end of the struggle with the state of Missouri over tolls. In 1966, the New Chain of Rocks Bridge was built immediately to the bridge's north in order to carry I-270; the Chain of Rocks Bridge was subsequently closed on February 25, 1970.

For nearly three decades the fate of the bridge was uncertain, though demolition seemed its most likely end. The high cost of demolition, however, indefinitely delayed that outcome until a new use was found. During this time, the bridge developed a reputation for crime and violence, including the April 1991 murder of sisters Julie and Robin Kerry. It was used as a filming site for Escape from New York in 1981, with the bridge being used as the "69th Street Bridge".

In 1998, the bridge was leased to Trailnet, a local trails group, to operate. Four-and-a-half million dollars have been spent on renovating the bridge for pedestrian and cycling use.

In December 2014, Trailnet transferred the lease on the bridge to the Great Rivers Greenway District.

The Chain of Rocks Bridge is the northern point of the Mississippi Greenway. Since 2014 Great Rivers Greenway has maintained the bridge and surrounding area on the Missouri side of the bridge. In August 2021 the National Park Service announced the award of a $990,000 grant to Great Rivers Greenway to help develop and enhance the visitor area on the Missouri side of the bridge. The project is estimated to cost nearly $5 million. Other funding will come from donations and sales tax revenue. The project will upgrade parking and security; restore wetlands, woodlands and other natural features; and add nature trails and a drinking fountain.

== Gallery ==
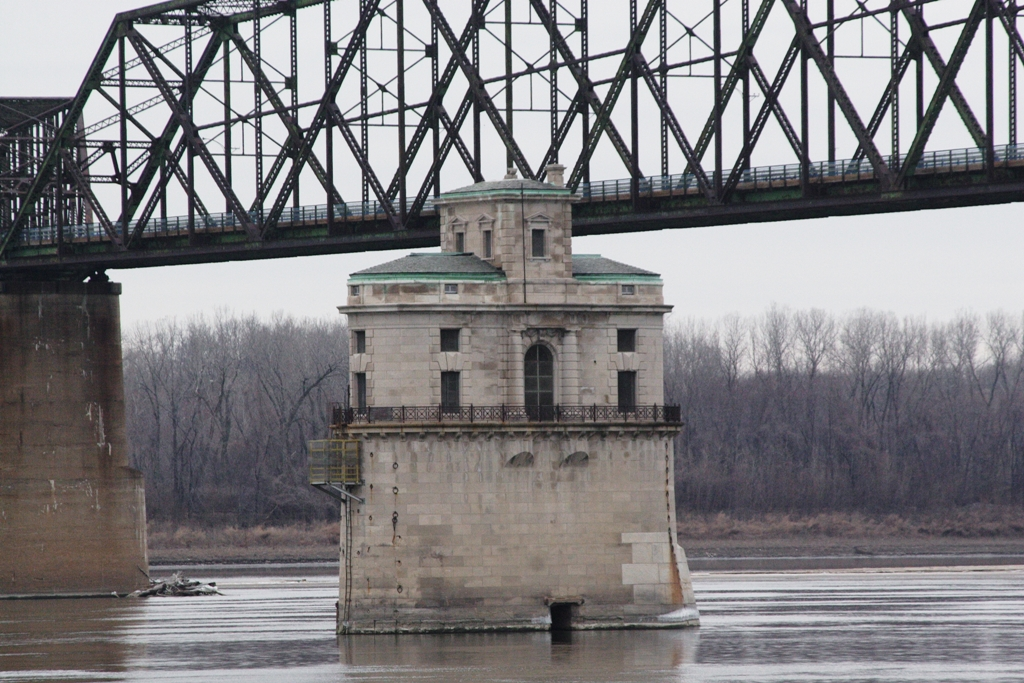
Water intake with one span of the Chain of Rocks Bridge

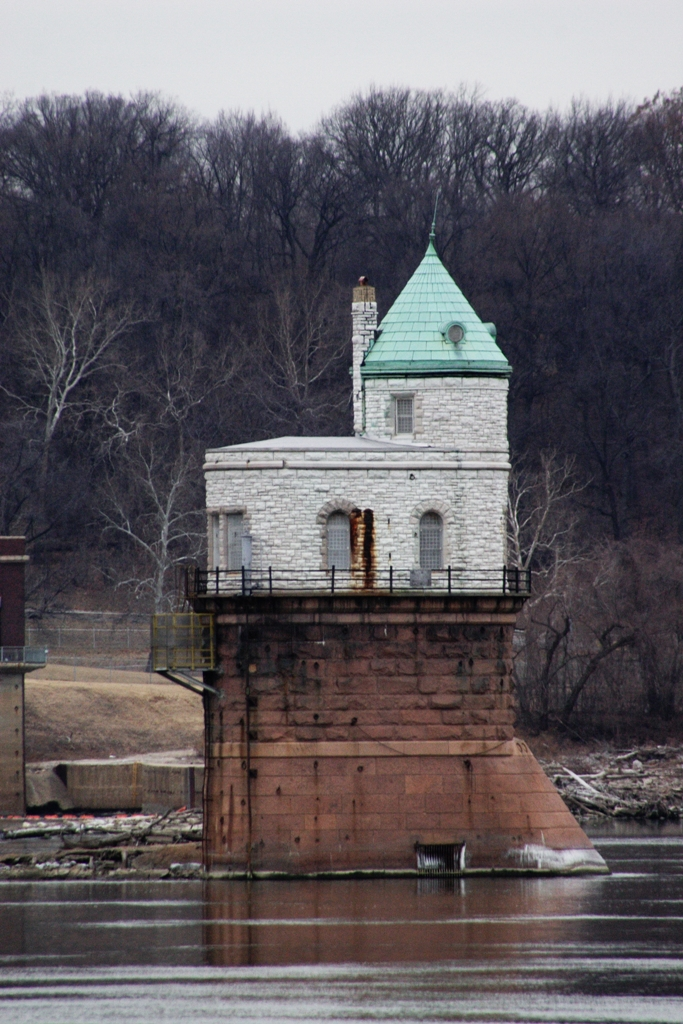
Water intake near Chain of Rocks Bridge

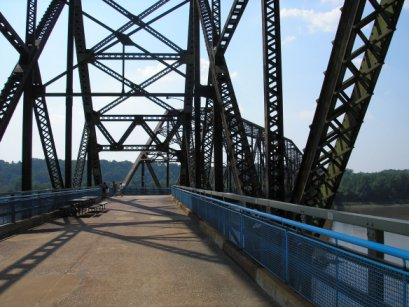
View on the bridge

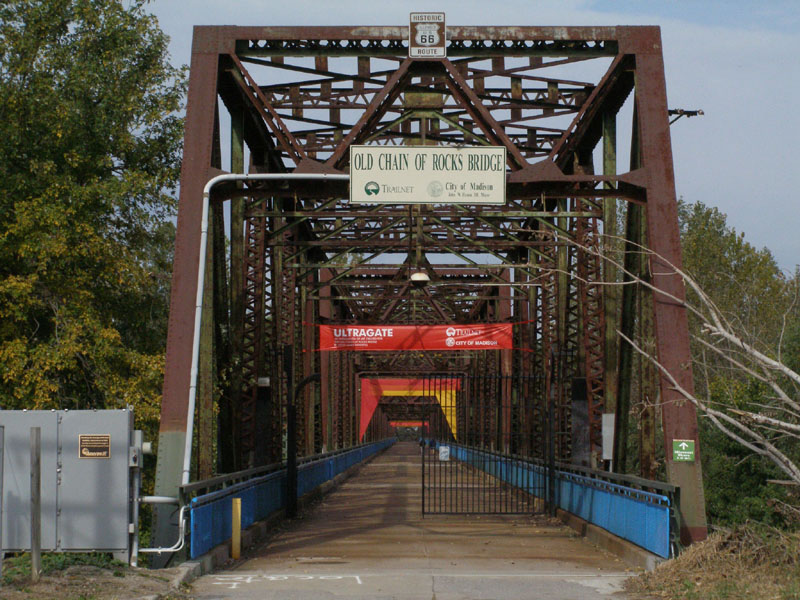
Illinois entrance to bridge

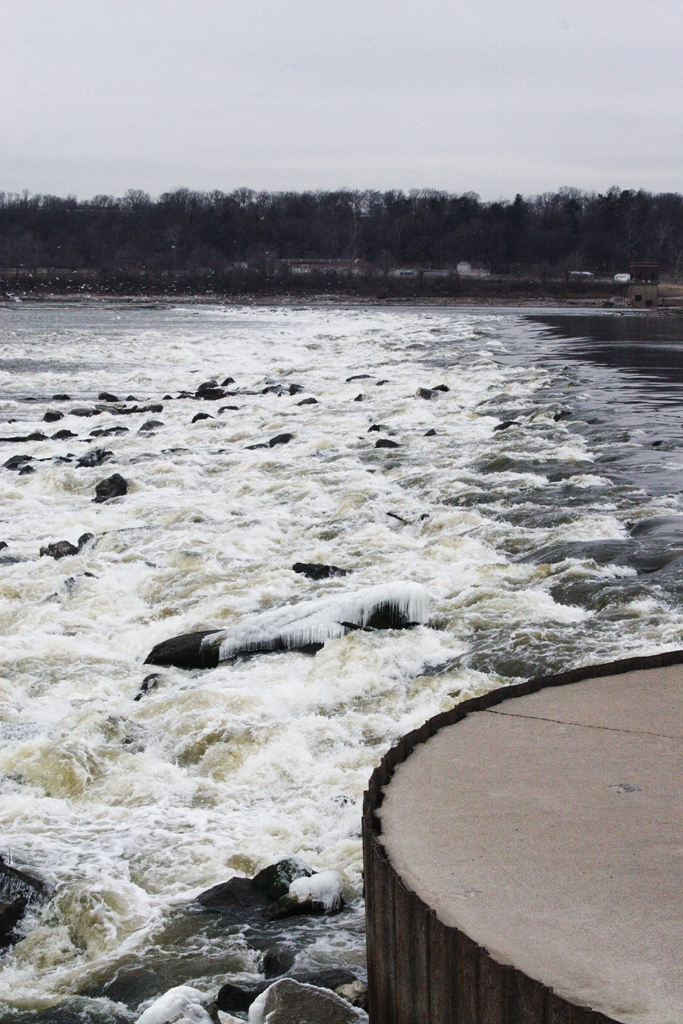
Low-water River Dam #27

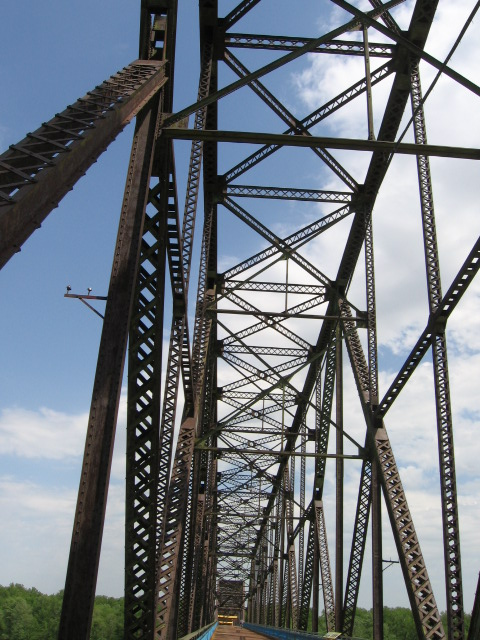
Just inside Illinois entrance to bridge

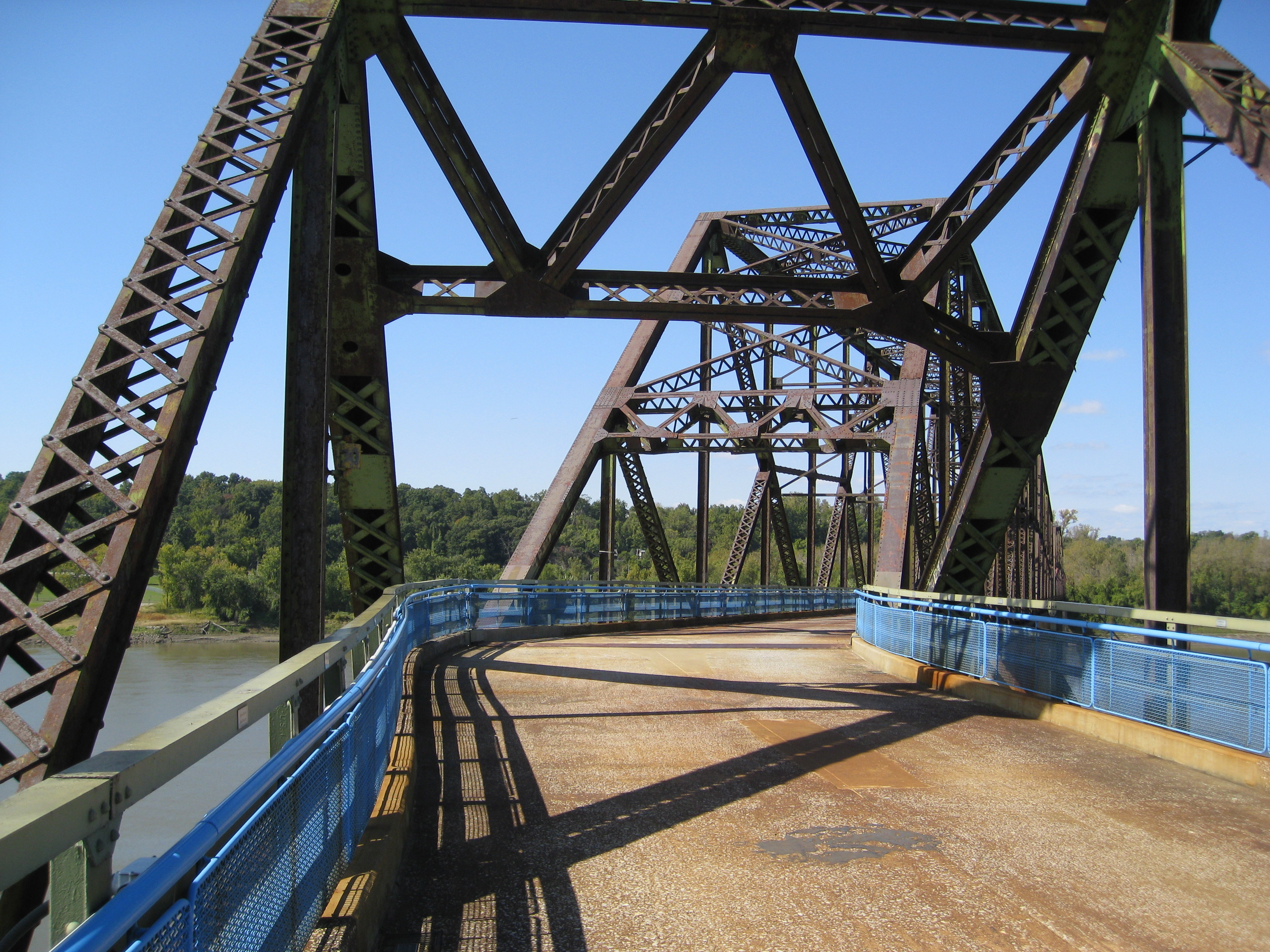
Close-up photo of 22-degree bend

== See also ==
- List of crossings of the Upper Mississippi River
- Chain of Rocks Lock
- Chain of Rocks Amusement Park
