= Pierson Limestone =

Geologic formation in Missouri, US

- Stratigraphic range: Mississippian
- Type: Formation
- Unit of: Chouteau Group basal unit of the Osagean Series
- Underlies: Reeds Spring Formation and Elsey Formation
- Overlies: Northview Formation

Lithology
- Primary: Limestone
- Other: Chert, dolomite

Location
- Region: Missouri
- Country: United States

Type section
- Named for: Pierson Creek, Greene County, Missouri
- Named by: Stuart Weller (1901)

The Pierson Limestone is a geologic formation in southwestern Missouri. It preserves fossils of the Mississippian subperiod including brachiopods and coral.
