= Reeds Spring Formation =

- Stratigraphic range: Mississippian Osagean Series
- Type: Formation
- Underlies: Elsey Formation
- Overlies: Pierson Formation

Lithology
- Primary: Limestone
- Other: Shale, chert

Location
- Region: Southwestern Missouri
- Country: United States

Type section
- Named for: Reeds Spring, Stone County, Missouri
- Named by: Moore in 1928

The Reeds Spring Formation is a geologic formation in southwestern Missouri. It preserves fossils dating back to the Osagean Series of the Mississippian subperiod.

== See also ==
- List of fossiliferous stratigraphic units in Missouri
- Paleontology in Missouri
