= Burlington Limestone =

Geologic formation in Iowa, Illinois, and Missouri, USA

- Stratigraphic range: Mississippian
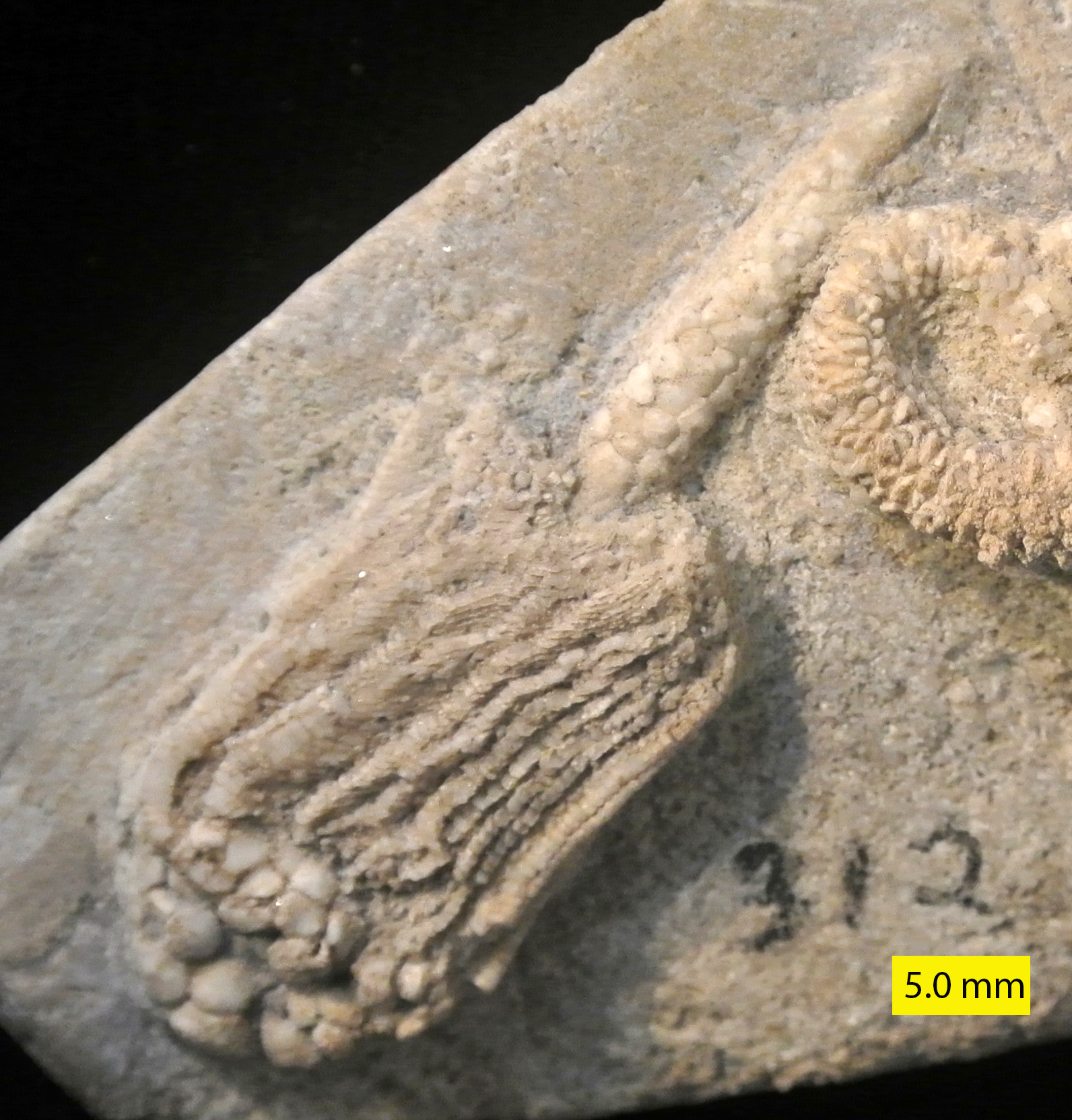
- Fossils from the Burlington Limestone
- Type: Formation
- Underlies: Keokuk Limestone
- Overlies: Elsey Formation, Fern Glen Formation, Pierson Limestone, Chouteau Group or Hannibal Shale

Lithology
- Primary: Limestone

Location
- Region: Illinois, Iowa, and Missouri
- Country: United States

Type section
- Named for: Burlington Des Moines County, Iowa

The Burlington Limestone is a geologic formation in Missouri, Iowa and the Midwest region. It preserves fossils dating back to the Mississippian subperiod.

== Physical properties ==
Burlington Limestone is unusually course-grained, crystalline, crinoidal limestone. Its texture is sufficiently distinctive and persistent to permit recognition of the formation commonly on this basis alone. The Burlington Limestone is made of almost entirely on the remains of various fossils, by far the most important of which are crinoids. Some portions of the Burlington, however, are not so evidently crinoidal, as for example, the so-called "white ledge" quarried in the northeastern part of Missouri.

== Natural occurrence ==
Burlington Limestone is present in nearly all major Mississippian outcrop regions in Missouri. It is known from Iowa to northwestern Arkansas and from western Illinois to western Kansas. It is present throughout Missouri, except in the Ozark uplift, where it has been removed by erosion. Differentiation of the Burlington with the overlaying, lithologically similar Keokuk Limestone is often difficult or impossible, so the sequence of Osagean limestones is sometimes identified as "Burlington-Keokuk Limestone".

== See also ==
- List of fossiliferous stratigraphic units in Missouri
- List of fossiliferous stratigraphic units in Iowa
- Paleontology in Missouri
