= Chain of Rocks Amusement Park =

Amusement park in Missouri, U.S.

Chain of Rocks Park
- Interactive map of Chain of Rocks Park
- Type: Amusement
- Location: St. Louis, Missouri, USA
- Coordinates: 38.7642°N 90.1852°W
- Area: 29.76 acres (120,400 m^{2})
- Created: 1927
- Closed: 1978
- Operator: Various
- Status: Defunct

Chain of Rocks Park (CoR) was an amusement park located in the St. Louis, Missouri area. CoR opened in 1927 and ceased operations in 1978. The park was situated across from the Chain of Rocks Bridge. CoR hosted many school picnics over the years.

== Geography ==
The park was located on the bluffs overlooking the Mississippi River and was bordered by the Mississippi River on the east and by the neighborhood of Glasgow Village on the west. The same location had also been proposed for the Louisiana Purchase Exhibition.

The park was long a favorite for many across the area, especially those from northern parts of St. Louis County and the City of St. Louis. It was accessed via Riverview Drive to Spring Garden Drive then to 10733 Lookaway Drive. The park was located where present-day Lookaway Court is now.

== See also ==
- Neighborhoods of St. Louis
- Parks in St. Louis, Missouri
- People and culture of St. Louis, Missouri
