= Grace Anne Stewart =

Canadian geologist

- Born: August 4, 1893; Minnedosa, Manitoba, Canada
- Died: October 15, 1970 (aged 77)
- Education: B.A. and M.A. majoring in geology at the University of Alberta Ph.D. at University of Chicago
- Known for: First female to earn a B.A. in geology in Canada

Grace Anne Stewart (4 August 1893 – 15 October 1970) was a Canadian geologist, known for being the first woman to graduate in geology in Canada at the University of Alberta.

== Biography ==
Grace Anne Stewart was born and raised in a rural farm near Minnedosa, Manitoba on August 4, 1893. Her parents were James Stewart and Elizabeth Crerar Stewart. Both her parents were Scottish.

In 1831, her great grandfather and grandfather, both known as James Stewart, immigrated to Canada from Scotland. The Stewarts established themselves in Stratford, Ontario. Grace Anne Stewart's father, James Stewart, was the only one of his six brothers to become a farmer. In 1881, he moved to Manitoba and settled on a farm near Minnedosa with Elizabeth Crerar Stewart, where Grace Anne Stewart was born.

Grace had two brothers and two sisters.

Although the family lived far from city life, Grace Anne and her siblings did not lack professional influences. Three of her uncles received medical degrees from the University of Chicago, while another was a lawyer, and her fifth uncle was a building contractor.

In 1918, Stewart earned her Bachelor of Arts majoring in geology at the University of Alberta. She was the first woman to attain this academic achievement in Canada. In her freshman and sophomore years she was a member of the Alberta College Literary Society. In 1918, she was also the captain of the girls hockey team, which was said to be an exceptional year in the history of the team. Upon earning her degree she remained at the University of Alberta as Assistant in the Department of Geology from 1918–1920, and in 1920, she earned a Masters in Arts. She was then awarded a fellowship at the University of Chicago. Here she worked under the supervision of Stuart Weller and earned a Ph.D. with distinction in 1922.

Grace Anne began her professional career in 1923 when she accepted an offer to become an instructor at Ohio State University. She was promoted to assistant professor in 1928 and subsequently promoted to associate professor in 1937. She attained the title of professor in 1946 and remained at Ohio State University until her retirement in 1954. Here she was active in Faculty Women's Group and was Chairman for one year. She also dedicated much of her time to the Geological Museum. Following her dissertation, Stewart focused primarily on Paleozoic faunas of Ohio and in 1937, was the Chairman of the Geology Section of the Ohio Academy of Science. Stewart was also listed as a member of Sigma Xi, fellow of the Paleontological Society, and a fellow of the Geological Society of America, and was listed in Who's Who - Women of America.

Stewart was highly active in her academic career. In the summers of 1919 and 1920 she worked for the Research Council of Alberta. The summers of 1921 and 1922 she spent working in the National Museum with the Geology Survey of Canada. It is noteworthy to mention that her collaboration with Dr. J.A. Allan at the University of Alberta lead to long-term exchanges of rock samples and fossils that aided the development of both institutions geological museums in 1924 to 1925.

During World War II, she worked at the Office of Strategic Services in Washington from October 1944 to October 1945 as a geographer. In 1954, Stewart retired and moved to Tucson, Arizona. However, this was not the end of her career. Stewart took a job offer in Calgary assigned with the task of correlating fossils found in oil well cores from different geographical areas. She returned to her retirement in Arizona after a short time in Calgary. In 1969 she suffered a stroke and was placed in a nursing home. She died in 1970 at the age of 77 having spent the last 16 years of her life in Tucson, Arizona.

One of Stewart's most notable works was for McGraw-Hill Encyclopedia of Science and Technology where she wrote an article on the Devonian period in the geology section. Of her personality, it was said that she gave her best effort whether in the office, laboratory, or a classroom. Stewart assumed roles in science that were almost exclusively reserved for men. She was said to be hospitable, gracious and dignified and well-liked by all. As a woman and being the minority during her studies, Stewart persevered and influenced many. In honour of her achievements as a woman in geology and as a graduate, the University of Alberta named a student-led initiative after her, called the Grace Anne Stewart Speaker Series. In 2015, eight graduate students created the G.A Stewart Speaker Series as a way to encourage more diversity in the Earth and Atmospheric Sciences faculty at the university. The faculty lacked diversity, where there was one female professor and the percentage of women in both undergraduate and graduate programs was less than 50% This initiative emphasizes increased representation for students, especially female students, and promotes the involvement with a variety of researchers and scientists in the geoscience community.
