= Keokuk Limestone =

Geologic formation in the United States

- Stratigraphic range: Mississippian
- Type: Formation
- Underlies: Warsaw Formation
- Overlies: Burlington Limestone

Lithology
- Primary: Limestone

Location
- Region: Illinois, Iowa, Missouri
- Country: United States

Type section
- Named for: Keokuk in southeastern Iowa

The Keokuk Limestone is a geologic formation in Illinois, Iowa and Missouri. It preserves fossils dating back to the Mississippian sub-period.

== See also ==
- List of fossiliferous stratigraphic units in Illinois
- List of fossiliferous stratigraphic units in Iowa
- List of fossiliferous stratigraphic units in Missouri
