= Compton Branch =

Stream in the American state of Missouri

Coordinates: 37.8228245°N 90.9492990°W

Compton Branch is a stream in Washington County in the U.S. state of Missouri. It is a tributary of Hazel Creek.

It is unknown why the name "Compton" was applied to this stream.

== See also ==
- List of rivers of Missouri
