= Chouteau Group =

Geologic group in Missouri

- Stratigraphic range: Mississippian
- Type: Group
- Sub-units: Northview Formation; Sedalia Formation; Compton Limestone
- Underlies: Pierson Limestone or Burlington Limestone
- Overlies: Chattanooga Shale (Devonian)

Location
- Region: Missouri
- Country: United States

The Chouteau Group is a geologic group in Missouri. It preserves fossils dating back to the Mississippian subperiod.

== See also ==
- List of fossiliferous stratigraphic units in Missouri
- Paleontology in Missouri
