= Venice Township, Madison County, Illinois =

Venice Township
- Township

- Location of Illinois in the United States
- Coordinates: 38°42′01″N 90°10′57″W
- Country: United States
- State: Illinois
- County: Madison
- Settled: November 2, 1875

Area
  - Total: 14.3 sq mi (37 km^{2})
  - Land: 10.82 sq mi (28.0 km^{2})
  - Water: 3.48 sq mi (9.0 km^{2})
- Elevation: 390 ft (120 m)

Population (2010)
  - Estimate (2016): 5,618
  - Density: 522.3/sq mi (201.7/km^{2})
- Time zone: UTC-6 (CST)
  - Summer (DST): UTC-5 (CDT)
- FIPS code: 17-119-77486

Venice Township is located in Madison County, Illinois, in the United States. As of the 2010 census, its population was 5,650 and it contained 2,728 housing units.

== History ==
Venice Township was named from the village of Venice in 1876.

== Geography ==
According to the 2010 census, the township has a total area of 14.3 square miles (37 km^{2}), of which 10.82 square miles (28.0 km^{2}) (or 75.66%) is land and 3.48 square miles (9.0 km^{2}) (or 24.34%) is water.

== Demographics ==
Historical population
Census	Pop.	Note	%±
2016 (est.)	5,618
U.S. Decennial Census
