= Stuart Weller =

American paleontologist

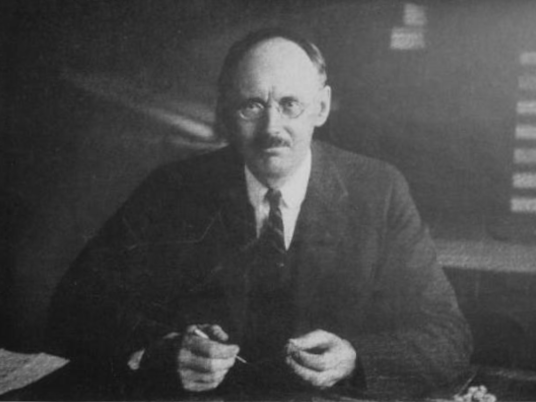
- Born: December 26, 1870; Maine, New York, US
- Died: August 5, 1927 (aged 56); Kentucky, US
- Education: Cornell University; Yale University
- Occupations: Paleontologist, geologist
- Spouse: Harriet A. Marvin (m. 1897)
- Children: 3

Stuart Weller (December 26, 1870 – August 5, 1927) was an American paleontologist and geologist.

== Biography ==
Stuart Weller was born in Maine, New York on December 26, 1870. Weller studied geology and paleontology at Cornell University with bachelor's degree in 1894 and at Yale University with Ph.D. in 1901. Beginning in 1895 he worked at the University of Chicago, where in 1897–1900 he was a research associate, and became in 1900 Instructor, in 1902 Assistant Professor, in 1908 Associate Professor and in 1915 Professor of Paleontology and Geology. It is noteworthy to mention that Weller supervised Grace Anne Stewart, the first Canadian female to earn a B.A. majoring in geology, as she earned her Ph.D. from the University of Chicago.

Weller's professional career was devoted largely to Paleozoic faunas of the Mississippi Valley, with particular emphasis on Mississippian strata. Field research for his studies was conducted during an annual summer field course in the Ste. Genevieve region of Missouri. Other research was made possible by Weller's long association with state and national geological surveys. From 1889 to 1907, Weller served as a paleontologist with the New Jersey Geological Survey, and from 1891 to 1927 as a geologist with the U.S. Geological Survey. His most important connection was with the Illinois State Geological Survey from 1906 to 1927, during which period he acted as the principal consultant on paleontological problems and produced a number of significant maps and stratigraphic reports. After 1920, he also expanded his studies of Missouri geology with fieldwork conducted under the auspices of the Kentucky Geological Survey.

He assembled and published the first geological map of Illinois under the new Survey in 1906, a second edition in 1907, and another provisional geological map of Illinois in 1912. In 1914, Weller was the first to detail the Ste. Genevieve fault. As a result of this work, Weller established the Ste. Genevieve field camp that attracted many students over the years. The camp no longer exists. His efforts in field mapping were focused on the Mississippian System, leading to a large number of mapped quadrangles mainly in Illinois. His son, J. Marvin, who became his field assistant, reported that the early fieldwork was done from tent camps that were moved from time to time by farm wagon.

In 1897, he married Harriet A. Marvin; the marriage produced three sons.

From 1919 until his death, in addition to his professorship, he was the director of the Walker Museum at the University of Chicago. In 1926 he was the president of the Paleontological Society.

He died while being driven from Salem to Paducah, Kentucky on August 5, 1927.

== Selected works ==
- Bibliographic index of North American Carboniferous invertebrates. U.S. Geological survey. Bulletinno. 153. Govt. print. off. 1898.
- Paleontology of the Niagaran limestone in the Chicago area, the Trilobita. The Chicago academy of sciences ... Bulletin no. IV of the Natural history survey. Printed by A. J. Mouat. 1900.
- Paleozoic faunas. Report on paleontology / Geological survey of New Jersey;vol. III. The J.L. Murphy publishing co., printers. 1903.
- Weller, Stuart (1903). "The Stokes collection of Antarctic fossils". Journal of Geology. 11 (4): 413. Bibcode:1903JG.....11..413W. doi:10.1086/621086. hdl:2027/hvd.32044107358970. S2CID 129815041.
- Paraphorhynchus ... 1905.
- Geological map of Illinois. 1906.
- Report on the Cretaceous paleontology of New Jersey. New Jersey Geological Survey. Report on paleontology, v. 4. MacCrellish & Quigley, State Printers. 1907.
- Mississippian Brachiopoda of the Mississippi Valley Basin. Monograph / State of Illinois, State Geological Survey;1. Illinois State Geological Survey, University of Illinois. 1914.
- Geology of Hardin County. Illinois State Geological Survey. Bulletin, no. 41. Illinois State Journal Co., State printers]. 1920.
- Geology of the Golconda quadrangle. Kentucky. Geological Survey. Ser. 6 [Geologic reports]v. 4. Kentucky Geological Survey. 1921.
- Geology of the Princeton quadrangle. 1923.
- Geology of the Cave in rock quadrangle. 1927.
- Paleontology and human relations. 1928.
- with Stuart St. Clair: Geology of Ste. Genevieve County, Missouri. 1928.
