= Chouteau Township, Madison County, Illinois =

Chouteau Township
- Township

- Location of Illinois in the United States
- Coordinates: 222,22 38°47′17″N 90°05′45″W
- Country: United States
- State: Illinois
- County: Madison
- Settled: November 2, 1875

Area
  - Total: 32.95 sq mi (85.3 km^{2})
  - Land: 29.7 sq mi (77 km^{2})
  - Water: 3.25 sq mi (8.4 km^{2})
- Elevation: 420 ft (130 m)

Population (2010)
  - Estimate (2016): 8,041
  - Density: 277/sq mi (107/km^{2})
- Time zone: UTC-6 (CST)
  - Summer (DST): UTC-5 (CDT)
- FIPS code: 17-119-14260
- Website: choutwp.com

Chouteau Township is located in Madison County, Illinois, in the United States. As of the 2010 census, its population was 8,226 and it contained 3,438 housing units. It contains the census-designated place of Mitchell.

== History ==
Chouteau Township was named after Chouteau Island, which was named for Pierre Chouteau, a member of the Chouteau family.

== Geography ==
According to the 2010 census, the township has a total area of 32.95 square miles (85.3 km^{2}), of which 29.7 square miles (77 km^{2}) (or 90.14%) is land and 3.25 square miles (8.4 km^{2}) (or 9.86%) is water.

== Demographics ==
Historical population
Census	Pop.	Note	%±
2016 (est.)	8,041
U.S. Decennial Census
