= List of fossiliferous stratigraphic units in Iowa =

This article contains a list of fossil-bearing stratigraphic units in the state of Iowa, U.S.

== Sites ==
Group or Formation	Period	Notes
Altamont Formation	Carboniferous	
Blanding Formation	Silurian	
Brainard Formation	Ordovician	
Bronson Group/Dennis Formation	Carboniferous	
Burlington Limestone	Carboniferous	
Cedar Valley Group/Coralville Formation	Devonian	
Cedar Valley Group/Linwood Formation	Devonian	
Cedar Valley Group/Lithograph City Formation	Devonian	
Cedar Valley Group/Little Cedar Formation	Devonian	
Cedar Valley Group/Shell Rock Formation	Devonian	
Chapin Formation	Carboniferous	
Cherokee Group	Carboniferous	
Coralville Formation	Devonian	
Dakota Formation	Cretaceous	
Decorah Shale	Ordovician	
Dennis Formation	Carboniferous	
Dewey Formation	Carboniferous	
Dunleith Formation	Ordovician	
English River Formation	Carboniferous	
Galena Dolomite	Ordovician	
Galena Group/Cummingsville Formation	Ordovician	
Galena Group/Decorah shale	Ordovician	
Galena Group/Dubuque Formation	Ordovician	
Galena Group/Dunleith Formation	Ordovician	
Galena Group/Guttenberg Formation	Ordovician	
Galena Group/Ion Formation	Ordovician	
Galena Group/Spechts Ferry Formation	Ordovician	
Galena Group/Wise Lake Formation	Ordovician	
Gilmore City Limestone	Carboniferous	
Glenwood Formation	Ordovician	
Gower Formation	Silurian	
Grand Detour Formation	Ordovician	
Graneros Shale	Cretaceous	
Guttenberg Formation	Ordovician	
Hackberry Group/Lime Creek Formation	Devonian	
Hampton Formation	Carboniferous	
Hopkinton Dolomite	Silurian	
Independence Shale	Devonian	
Iola Formation	Carboniferous	
Ion Formation	Ordovician	
Kansas City Group/Swope Formation	Carboniferous	
Keokuk Limestone	Carboniferous	
LaPorte City Formation	Silurian	
Lecompton Formation	Carboniferous	
Lime Creek Formation	Devonian	
Lost Branch Formation	Carboniferous	
Maquoketa Group	Ordovician	
Maquoketa Group/Brainard Shale	Ordovician	
Maquoketa Group/Fort Atkinson Limestone	Ordovician	
Maquoketa Group/Neda Formation	Ordovician	
Maquoketa Group/Scales Shale	Ordovician	
Marmaton Group/Labette	Carboniferous	
Maynes Creek Formation	Carboniferous	
McCraney Limestone	Carboniferous	
Mifflin Formation	Ordovician	
Mosalem Formation	Silurian	
Nachusa Formation	Ordovician	
North Hill Group/English River	Devonian	
Oneota Formation	Ordovician	
Pawnee Formation	Carboniferous	
Pecatonica Formation	Ordovician	
Pella Formation	Carboniferous	
Platteville Group/Grand Detour Formation	Ordovician	
Platteville Group/Mifflin Formation	Ordovician	
Platteville Group/Pecatonica Formation	Ordovician	
Platteville Group/Quimbys Mill Formation	Ordovician	
Prosser Limestone	Ordovician	
Quimbys Mill Formation	Ordovician	
Racine Formation	Silurian	
Saturday Mountain Formation	Ordovician	
Scotch Grove Formation	Silurian	
Shawnee Group/Deer Creek Limestone	Carboniferous	
Shawnee Group/Kanwaka Formation	Carboniferous	
Shawnee Group/Oread Limestone	Carboniferous	
Shell Rock Formation	Devonian	
Spechts Ferry Formation	Ordovician	
Spillville Formation	Devonian	
St. Louis Formation	Carboniferous	
St. Peter Sandstone	Ordovician	
Stanton Formation	Carboniferous	
Stewartville Formation	Ordovician	
Swope Formation	Carboniferous	
Traverse Group/Cedar Valley Formation	Devonian	
Wapsipinicon Formation	Devonian	
Warsaw Formation	Carboniferous	
Wassonville Formation	Carboniferous	
Wise Lake Formation	Ordovician	
Yellow Springs Group/Sheffield Formation	Devonian	

== See also ==
- Paleontology in Iowa
