= List of fossiliferous stratigraphic units in Wisconsin =

This article contains a list of fossil-bearing stratigraphic units in the state of Wisconsin, U.S.

== Sites ==
Group or Formation	Period	Notes
Black River Group/Platteville Formation	Ordovician	
Black River Group/Platteville Limestone	Ordovician	
Brandon Bridge Formation	Silurian	
Byron Formation	Silurian	
Decorah Formation	Ordovician	
Decorah Shale	Ordovician	
Dresbach Formation	Cambrian	
Franconia Formation	Cambrian	
Galena Formation	Ordovician	
Galena Dolomite	Ordovician	
Galena Group/Dubuque Formation	Ordovician	
Galena Group/Dunleith Formation	Ordovician	
Galena Group/Guttenberg Formation	Ordovician	
Galena Group/Ion Formation	Ordovician	
Galena Group/Spechts Ferry Formation	Ordovician	
Galena Group/Wise Lake Formation	Ordovician	
Glenwood Formation	Ordovician	
Grand Detour Formation	Ordovician	
Guttenberg Formation	Ordovician	
Ion Formation	Ordovician	
Jordan Sandstone	Cambrian	
Lake Church Formation	Devonian	
Manistique Formation	Silurian	
Maquoketa Formation	Ordovician	
Maquoketa Group/Brainard Shale Formation	Ordovician	
Maquoketa Group/Fort Atkinson Formation	Ordovician	
Maquoketa Group/Fort Atkinson Limestone	Ordovician	
Maquoketa Group/Neda Formation	Ordovician	
Maquoketa Group/Scales Shale Formation	Ordovician	
Mayville Formation	Silurian	
Mifflin Formation	Ordovician	
Milwaukee Formation	Devonian	
Nachusa Formation	Ordovician	
Oneota Formation	Ordovician	
Pecatonica Formation	Ordovician	
Platteville Formation	Ordovician	
Platteville Group/Grand Detour Formation	Ordovician	
Platteville Group/McGregor Formation	Ordovician	
Platteville Group/Mifflin Formation	Ordovician	
Platteville Group/Pecatonica Formation	Ordovician	
Platteville Group/Quimbys Mill Formation	Ordovician	
Potsdam Sandstone	Cambrian	
Prairie du Chien Group	Ordovician	
Quimbys Mill Formation	Ordovician	
Racine Formation	Silurian	
Racine Dolomite	Silurian	
Spechts Ferry Formation	Ordovician	
St. Peter Sandstone	Ordovician	
Trempealeau Formation	Cambrian	
Waukesha Formation	Silurian	
Waukesha Dolomite	Silurian	

== See also ==
- Paleontology in Wisconsin
