= List of fossiliferous stratigraphic units in Minnesota =

This article contains a list of fossil-bearing stratigraphic units in the state of Minnesota, U.S.

== Sites ==
| Group or Formation | Period | Notes |
|---|---|---|
| Colerain Formation | Cretaceous | |
| Coleraine Formation | Cretaceous | |
| Cummingsville Formation | Ordovician | |
| Dakota Formation | Cretaceous | |
| Decorah | Ordovician | |
| Decorah Shale | Ordovician | |
| Dubuque Formation | Ordovician | |
| Franconia Formation | Cambrian | |
| Galena Group/Cummingsville Formation | Ordovician | |
| Galena Group/Decorah Shale | Ordovician | |
| Glenwood Formation | Ordovician | |
| Greenhorn Formation | Cretaceous | |
| Guttenberg Formation | Ordovician | |
| Ion Formation | Ordovician | |
| Maquoketa Group/Elgin Formation | Ordovician | |
| Oneota Formation | Ordovician | |
| Platteville Formation | Ordovician | |
| Prosser Limestone | Ordovician | |
| Shakopee Formation | Ordovician | |
| Spechts Ferry Formation | Ordovician | |
| Spillville Formation | Devonian | |
| St. Peter Sandstone | Ordovician | |
| Stewartville Formation | Ordovician | |
| Windrow Formation | Cretaceous | |

== See also ==
- Paleontology in Minnesota
