= Blanding Formation =

Geologic formation in Iowa, USA

- Stratigraphic range: Silurian
- Type: Formation

Location
- Region: Iowa, Illinois
- Country: United States

The Blanding Formation is a geologic formation in Iowa and Northern Illinois. It preserves fossils dating back to the Silurian period. It was named after the community of Blanding, Illinois, and is found around the Mississippi River Bluffs.

The formation is alternatively referred to as the Elwood-Joliet formation, Burlington formation, and Glacial Till chert. The information about those specific formation can vary, indicating some variance in how the different names the formation is called can result in the presentation of different information. Glacial Till chert seems to be the least-specific way to refer to this layer, with the geologic formations described by that term having notable visual differences.

== Composition ==
The Blanding Formation is primarily composed of dolomite. The area around the Quad Cities characterized by deposits of chert in the highest levels of any Silurian formation in that region. The formation has a thickness of between 52 and 20 feet, depending on the area sampled.

The formation underlies the Sweeney Formation. It overlies the Tete des Morts formation in the North, and the Mosalem Formation in the South. There is also an area in which it overlays the Maquoketa Formation. The Blanding formation is dated to the middle Llandoverian Epoch of the Early Silurian Period.

== Visual Appearance ==
The formation can be seen above-ground at times, most frequently in areas where the river has eroded a path or where the surrounding rock has been removed for developments such as a road. The formation is typically a brownish-grey, which is frequently very light. Ground water introduces iron oxide deposits into the bedding, which may darken the layer's color. When exposed to heat, the formation develops a more pink hue and often appears darker.

== Commercial Endeavors ==
The Blanding formation was mined by Wendling Quarries, Inc and Butler, Frank Co in Whiteside County, Il.

== See also ==
- List of fossiliferous stratigraphic units in Iowa
- Paleontology in Iowa
