= Lithograph City Formation =

Geologic formation in Iowa and Minnesota, USA

- Stratigraphic range: Devonian
- Type: Formation
- Unit of: Cedar Valley Group

Location
- Country: United States
- Extent: Iowa and Minnesota

The Lithograph City Formation is a geologic formation in Iowa, part of the Cedar Valley Group. It preserves fossils dating back to the Devonian period. The formation is composed of dolomite and limestone, with many fossils and vugs in the lower part, while the upper part contains few fossils.

The formation is named after exposures in the former company town of Lithograph City, where quarries were opened to exploit the high-quality lithographic limestone found in parts of this formation.

== See also ==
- List of fossiliferous stratigraphic units in Iowa
- Paleontology in Iowa
