= Cedar Valley Formation =

Geologic formation in Iowa, USA

- Stratigraphic range: Devonian
- Type: Formation
- Underlies: Lime Creek Formation

Location
- Region: Iowa
- Country: United States

The Cedar Valley Formation is a geologic formation in Iowa. It preserves fossils dating back to the Devonian period. No type locality has ever been designated for this formation, but it is best known for limestone and dolomite exposures in and around Johnson County, Iowa. The formation is exposed in numerous road cuts, quarries and valley walls over much of north-east and north-central Iowa.

== See also ==
- List of fossiliferous stratigraphic units in Iowa
- Paleontology in Iowa
