= Scotch Grove Formation =

Geologic formation in Iowa, USA

- Stratigraphic range: Silurian
- Type: Formation
- Underlies: Gower Formation
- Overlies: Hopkinton Formation

Lithology
- Primary: dolomite
- Other: Chert

Location
- Region: Iowa
- Country: United States

Type section
- Named for: Scotch Grove Township, Jones County, Iowa

The Scotch Grove Formation is a geologic formation in Iowa. It preserves fossils dating back to the Silurian period.

== See also ==
- List of fossiliferous stratigraphic units in Iowa
- Paleontology in Iowa
