= Sinnipee Group =

Geological group in Wisconsin

- Stratigraphic range: Ordovician
- Type: Group
- Sub-units: Platteville limestone, Decorah Shale & Galena Group

Lithology
- Primary: Limestone
- Other: Dolomite, shale

Location
- Region: Wisconsin
- Country: United States

The Sinnipee Group is geological group in Southern and Eastern Wisconsin. It consists primarily of sedimentary carbonate rocks. Primarily made of dolomite, it also has limestone as a secondary component and can even have shale imbedded with it. It was formed in the Ordovician period and has three rock members: Galena, Decorah, and Platteville formations.

== Formations ==
The Platteville Limestone is one of the formations of the Sinnipee Group. It is primarily made of limestone. It lies over the Glenwood Shale. In many places, the Platteville Limestone has dolomitic mottles. This member is heavily jointed and the mottles happened before the jointing. This particular member is being quarried heavily. While not as full as the Decorah Shale, the Platteville Limestone is a large layer that has bryozoans, brachiopods, clams, snails, cephalopods, and trilobites that can be found in the limestone sediments. The Platteville Limestone is easily seen along the roads following the Mississippi River due to erosion.

The Decorah Shale is another formation of the Sinnipee Group. It is primarily made of fossiliferous shale. It lies on top of the platteville limestone formed by the shallow sea that covered central North America. Because of its chemistry it tends to erode rapidly. Since the Decorah Shale is fossiliferous the Decorah Shale layer is often used as a place for amateur fossil hunters to begin their collections. It also serves as release of phosphate ions into the ground water system if acid rain is introduced to it. This allows, in some cases, for new minerals. The Decorah Shale formation is made of three members. These members are the Spects Ferry, an argillaceous limestone, argillaceous dolomite, Calcareous shale and argillaceous limestones.

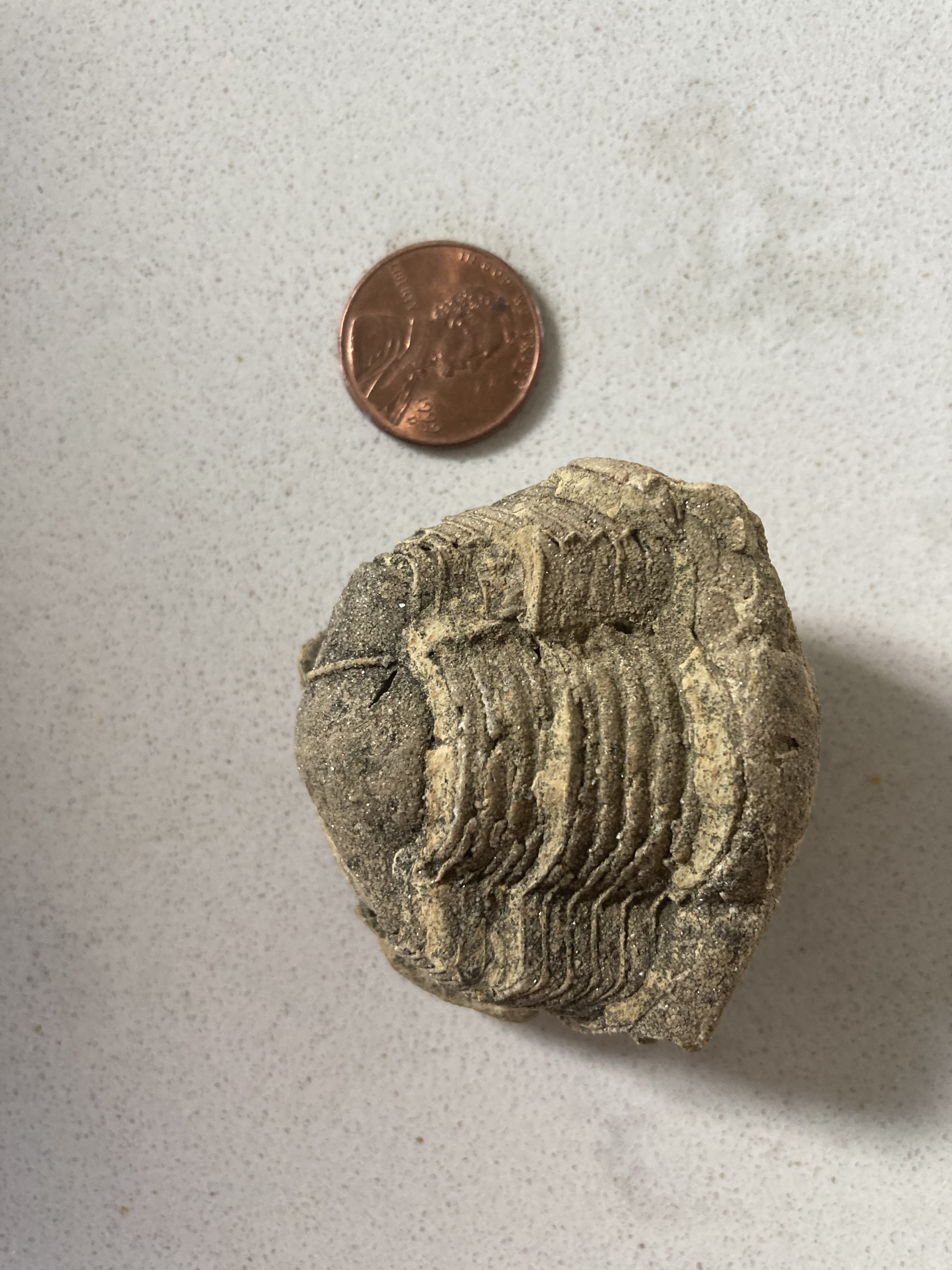
The Illaenid trilobite Thaleops found in the Sinnipee Group in Dane County

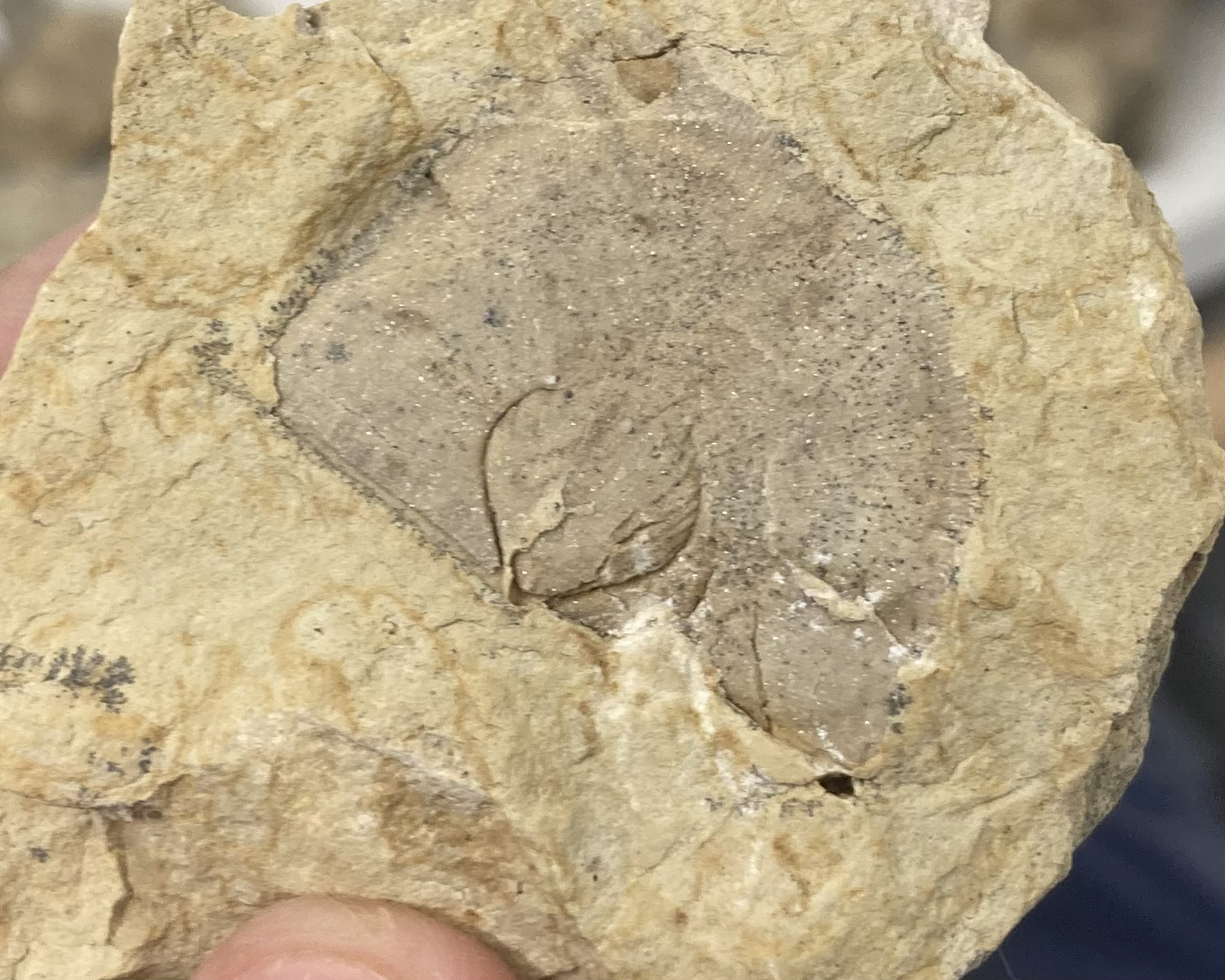
The strophomenid brachiopod Strophomena from the Sinnipee Group in Dane County

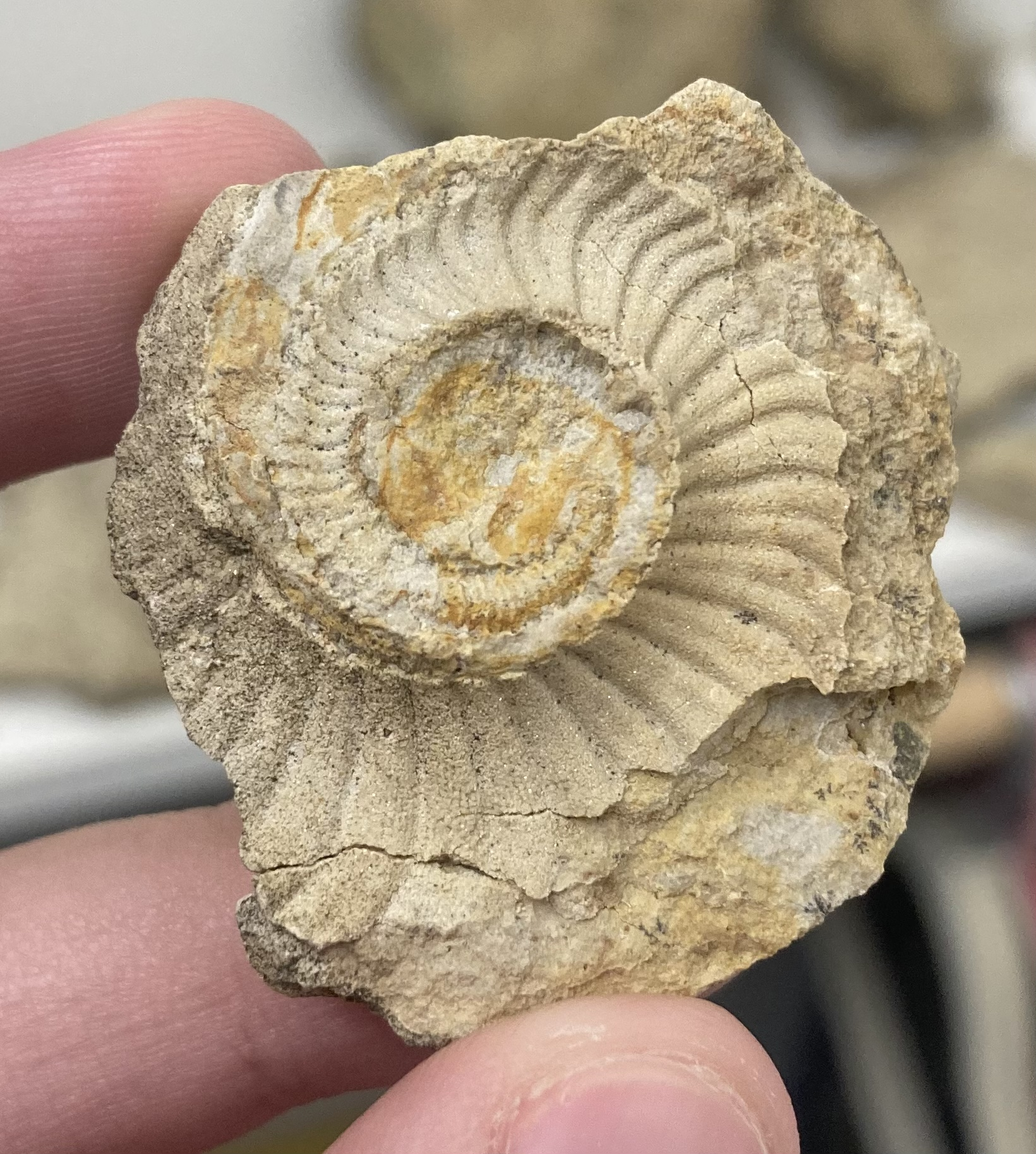
The imprint of the nautiloid Trocholites from the Sinnipee Group in Dane County

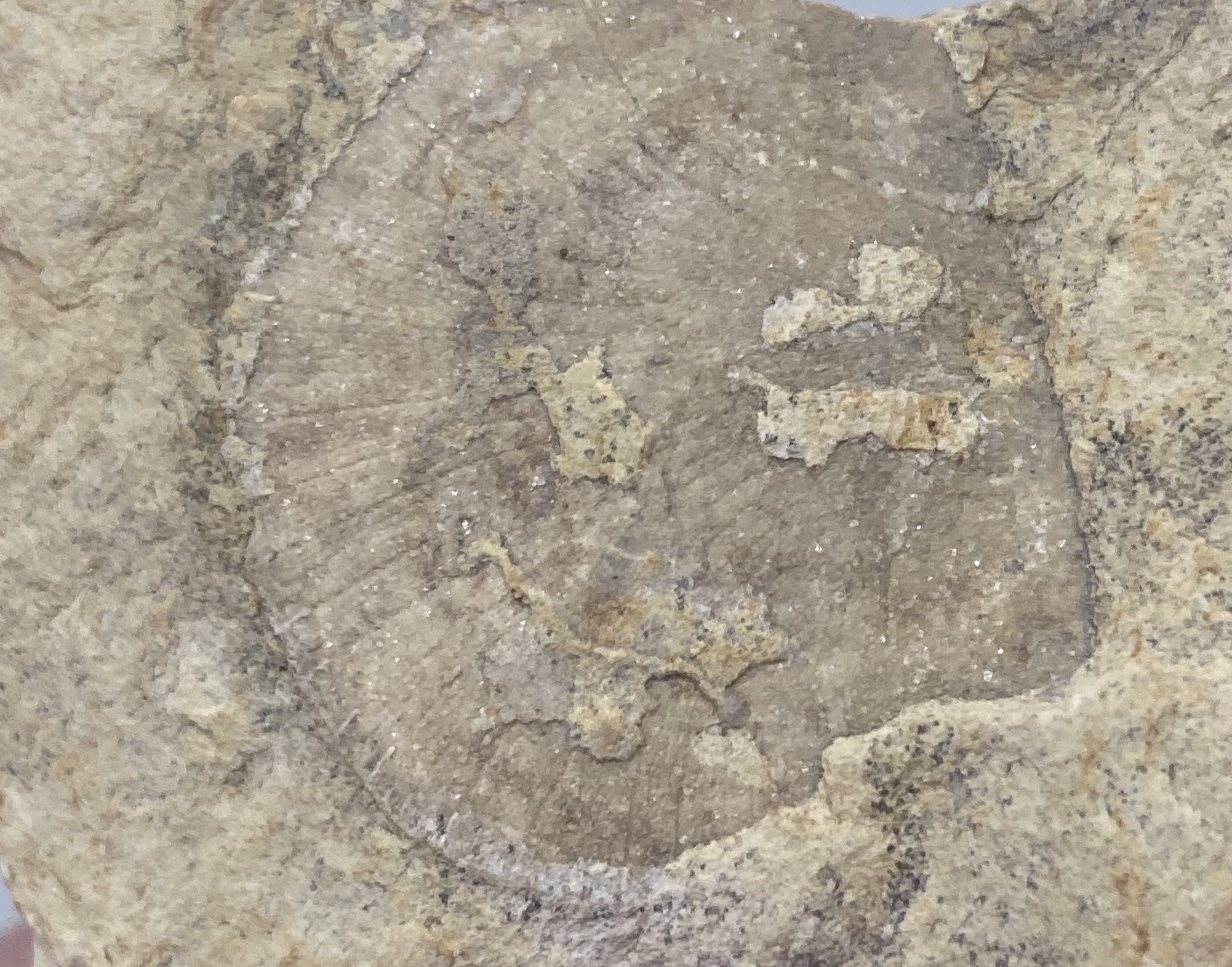
An unidentified orthid brachiopod from the Sinnipee Group in Dane County

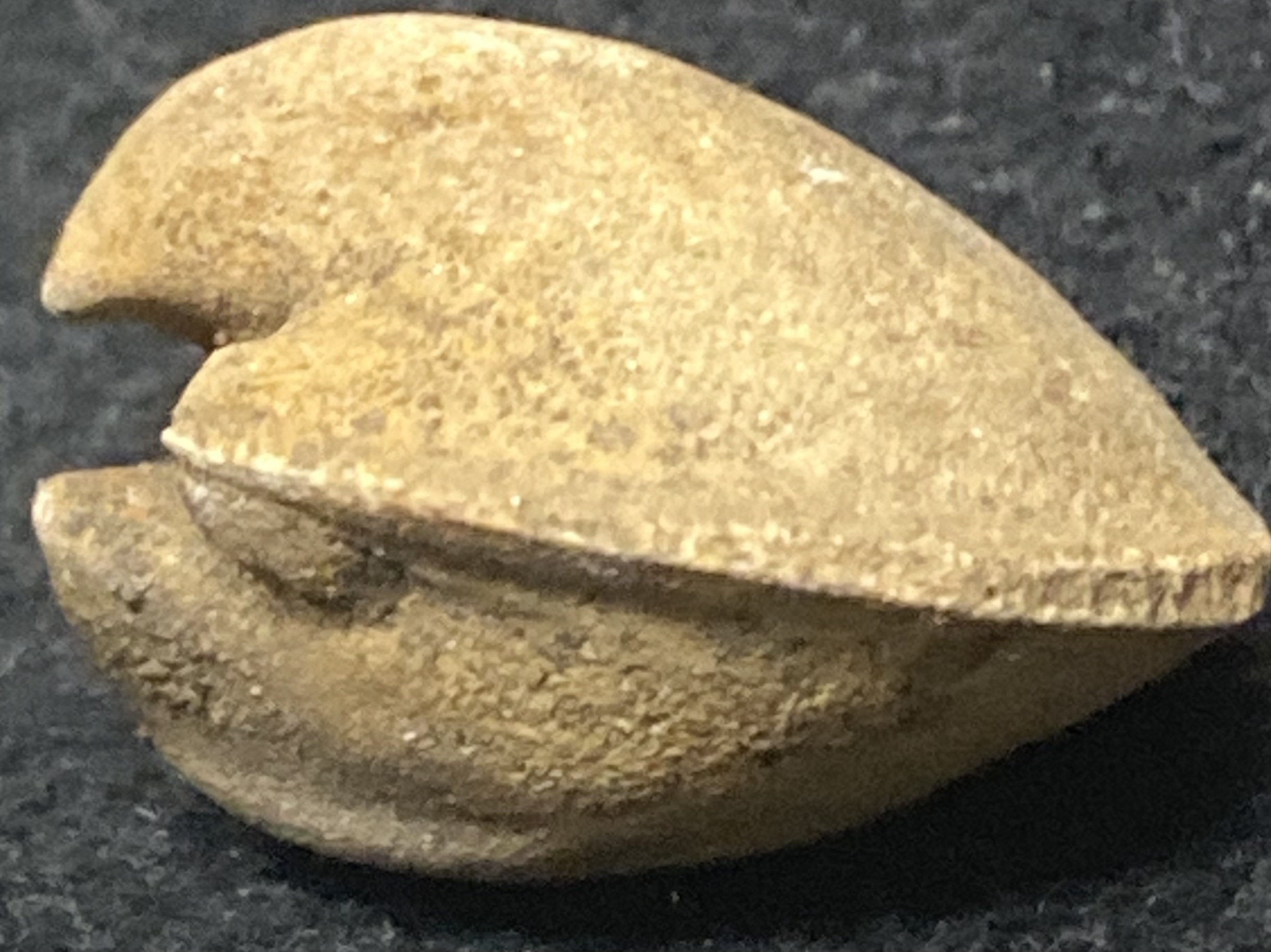
A bivalve mollusk called Saffordia from the Sinnipee Group in Dane County

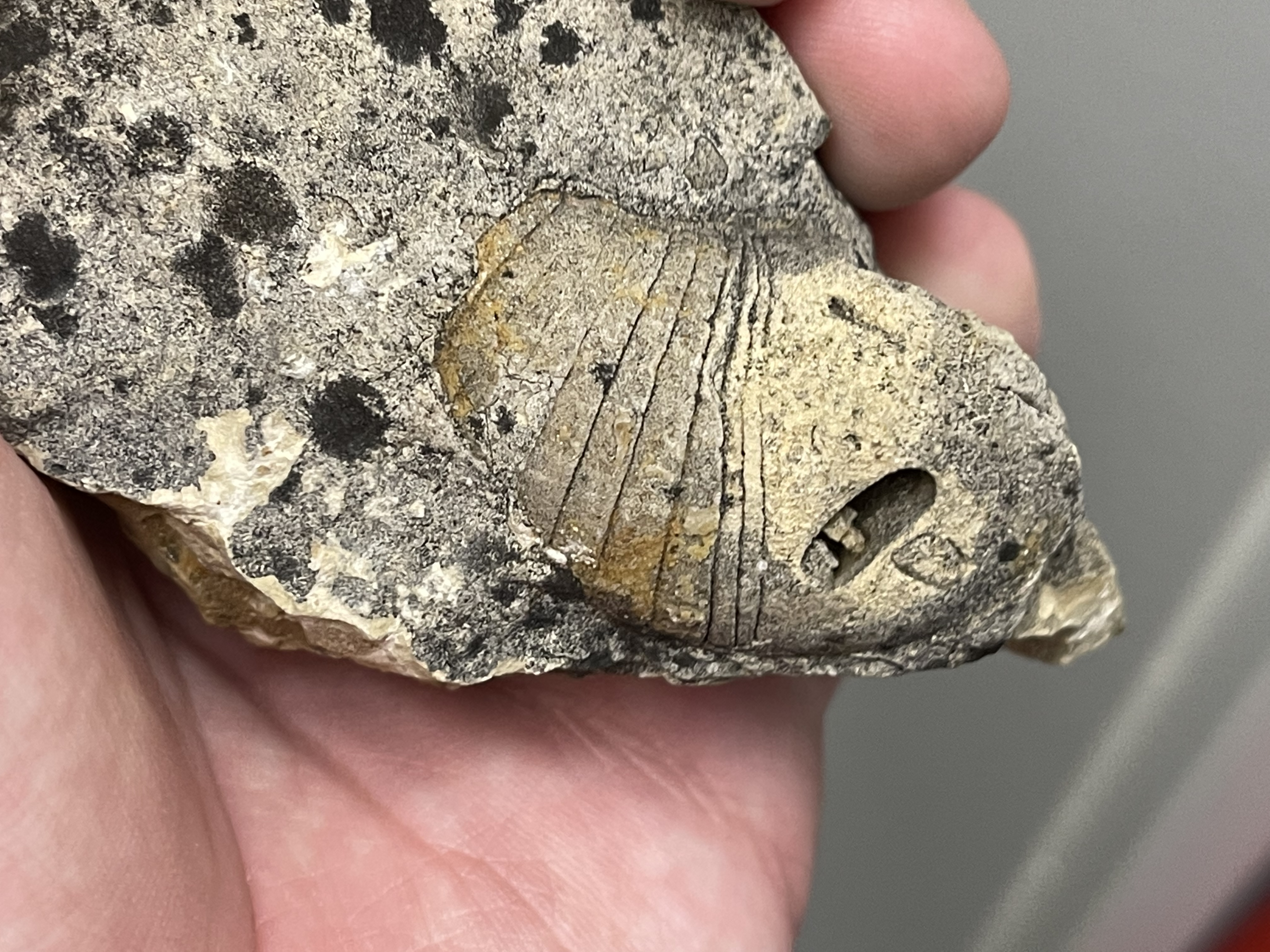
A large nautiloid cephalopod called Beloitoceras belonging to the group Oncocerida from the Sinnipee Group in Dane County

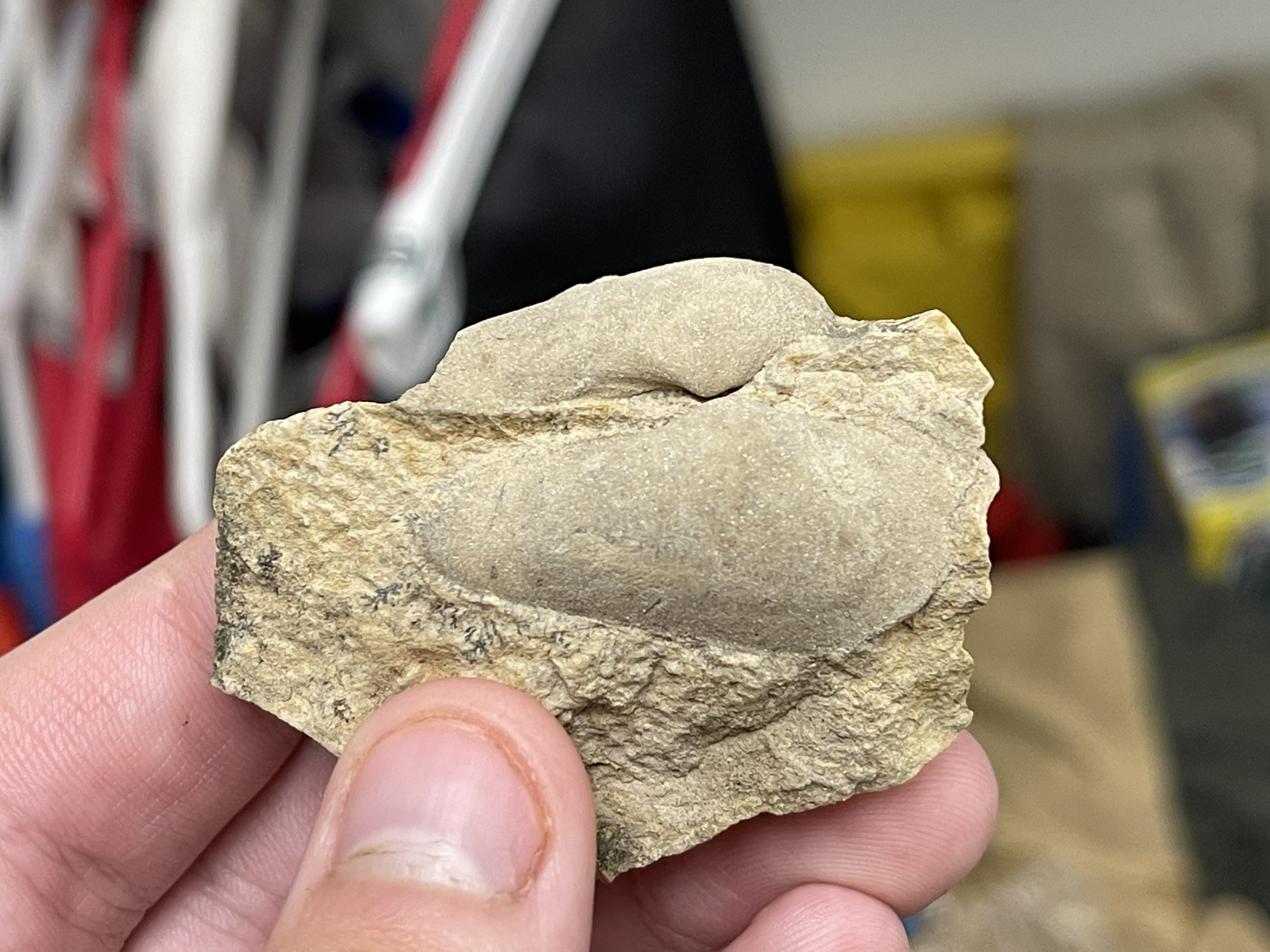
A mid sized bivalve mollusk called Similodonta from Dane County

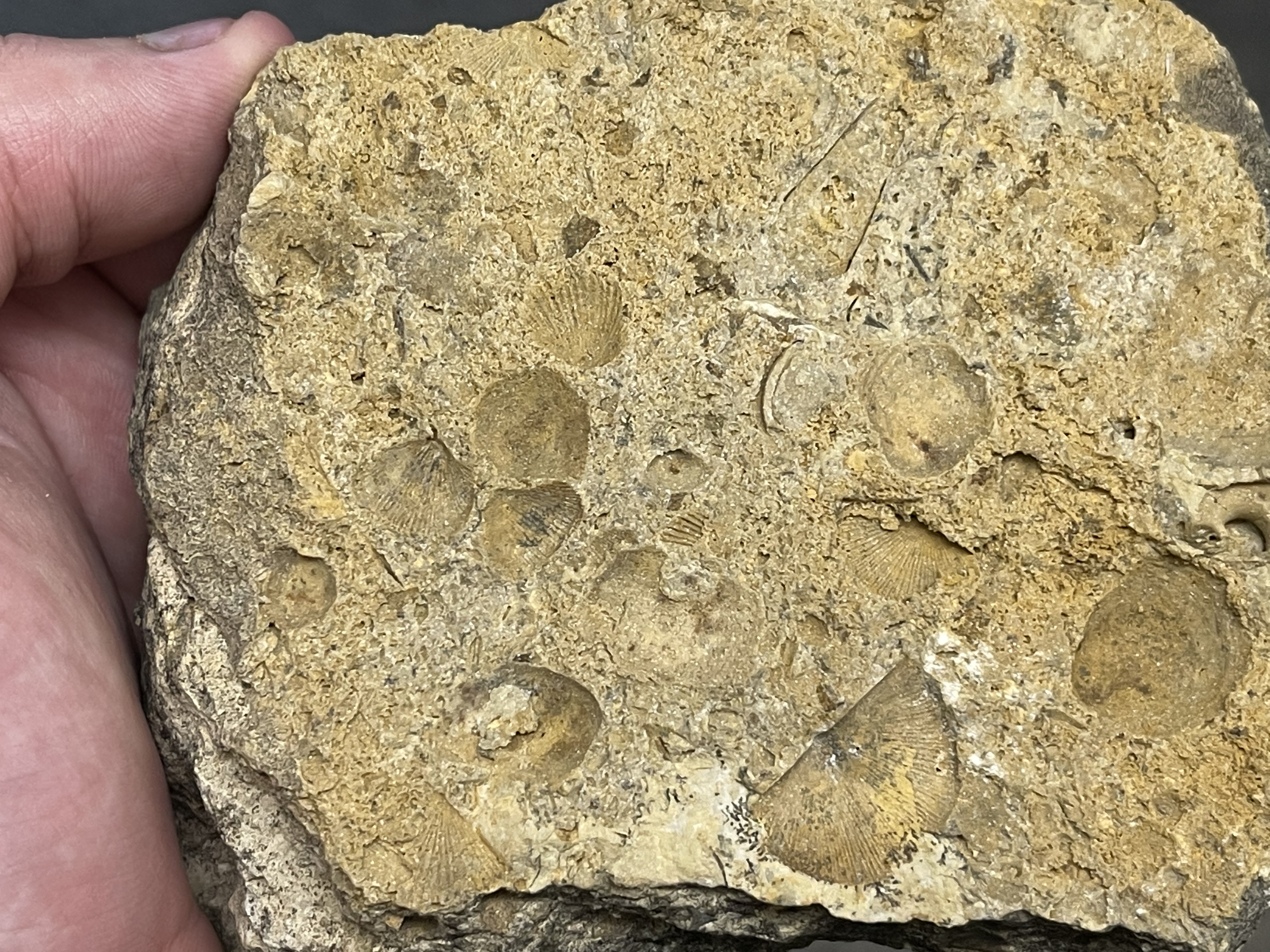
A mass death plate of rhynchonellid and strophomenid brachiopods as well as modiomorphid bivalves from Dane County

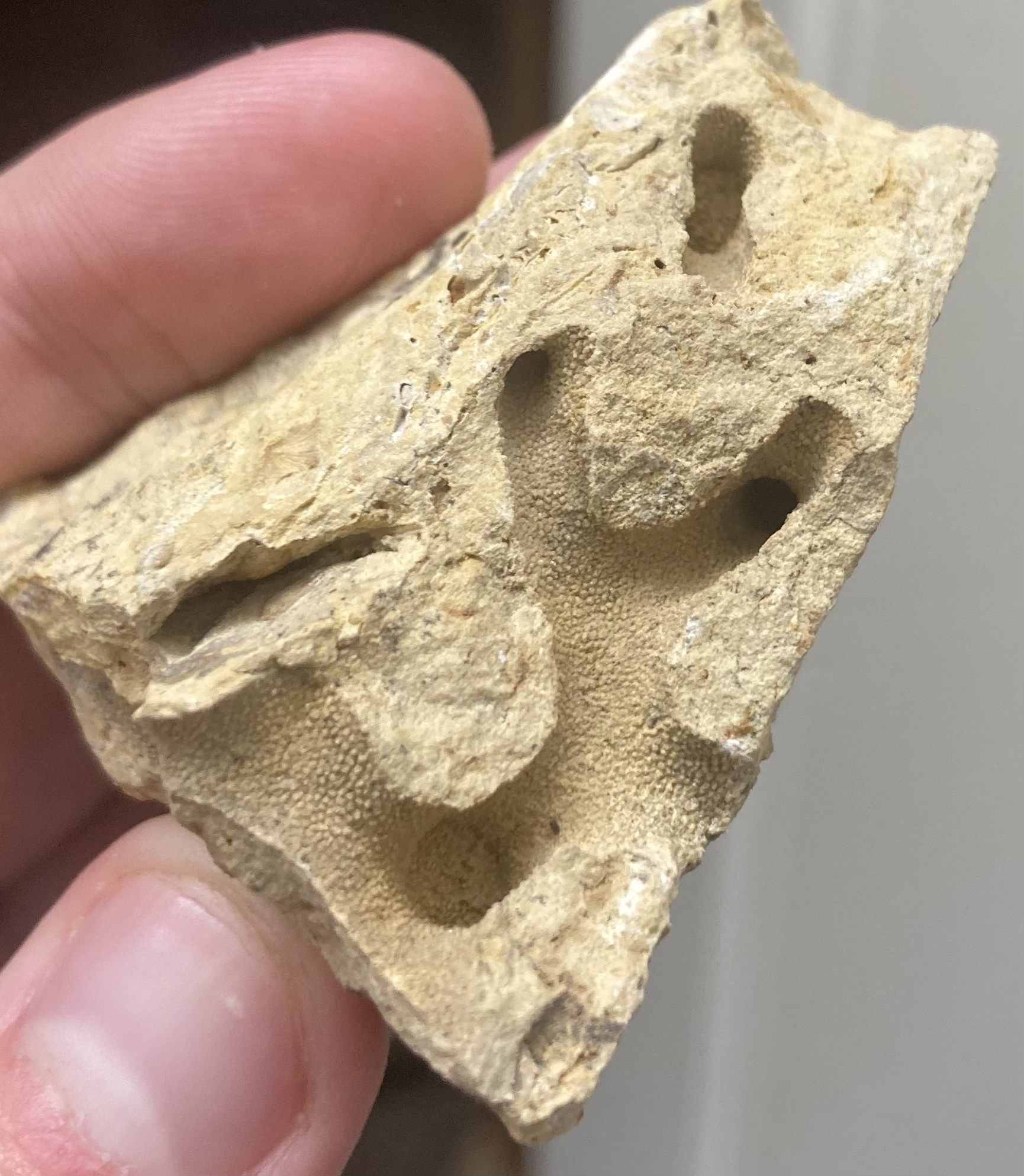
The imprint of a bryozoan, a colonial invertebrate that is still alive today from the Sinnipee Group

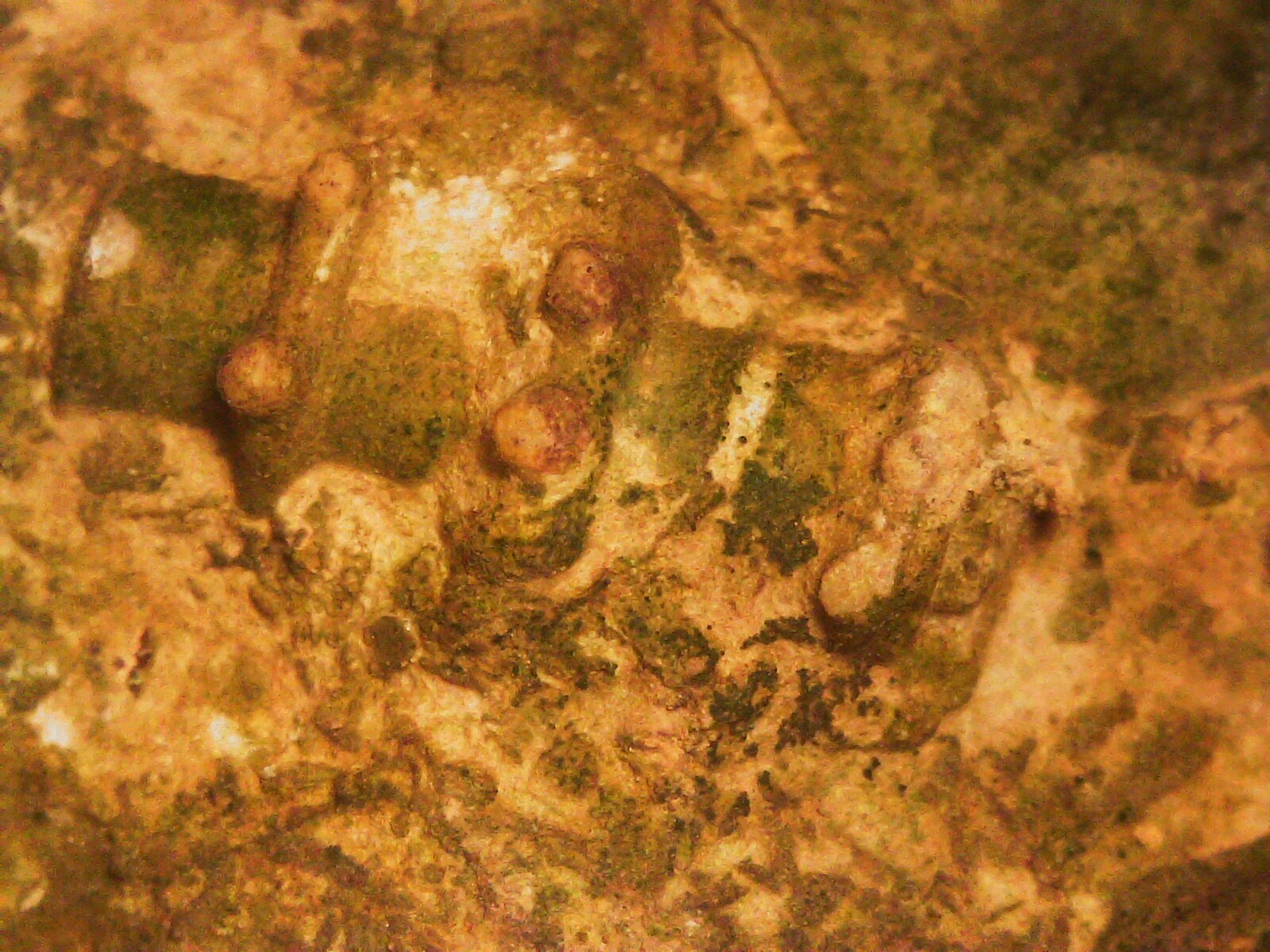
A partial stem belonging to the crinoid Pycnocrinus from a riverbed belonging to the Sinnipee Group

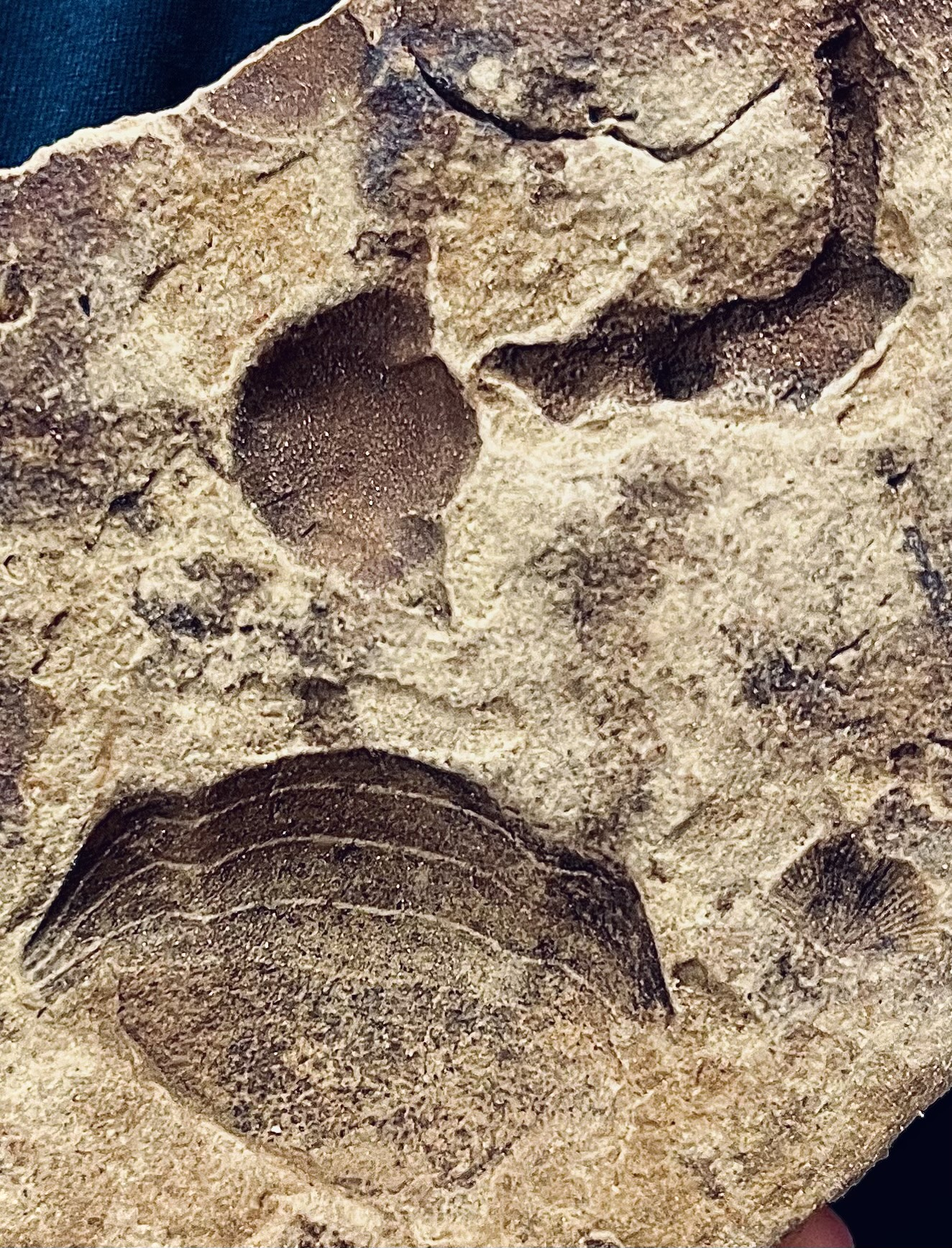
The imprints of the pygidium and lower thorax of Isotelus, the cephalon of Thaleops, a brachiopod and a bryozoan from the Sinnipee Group.

The Galena Group is also a formation of the Sinnipee Group. It is primarily made of Limestone and is deposited on the Decorah Shale. The Galena Group is considered fossiliferous. It is believed that the Galena Group was deposited in a calm marine environment.

== Counties ==
The Sinnipee Group covers around 25% of Wisconsin, including part or all of the following counties: Brown, Calumet, Dane, Dodge, Fond du Lac, Grant, Green, Green Lake, Iowa, Jefferson, Lafayette, Marinette, Oconto, Outagamie, Rock, Walworth, Waukesha, Winnebago.It is a belt approx. twenty miles wide that stretches from Marinette County south through the Fox Valley to the Beloit area, and west to the Mississippi River.

== Formation ==
Formation of the Sinnipee Group took place in the Ordovician. It is believed that this group formed from a shallow sea that once covered much of North America. Each of its formations have their own pattern to their deposition and each is slightly different however they are unified by a shallow sea.

== Landscape ==
Because of being mostly made of dolomite and limestone the landscape has become a Karst environment. This is important because the karst environment influences the Water movement in the rock layers. The Sinnipee Group has many Springs and several cave systems including Cave of the Mounds. This environment even allows for disappearing streams. Another reason this environment is important is because it has so many places to store water and that water is almost a limitless resource. The water leads to better agricultural yields as well as affecting our land such as watered lawns, and some protection from droughts or floods.

== Overburden ==
The Sinnipee Group over burden consists of glacial till from the Laurentide Ice Sheet that is around 11,000 years ago. However, this till only covers to the driftless zone and does not extend where the glaciers did not.

== See also ==
- Sequence stratigraphy
- Stratigraphy
- Glaciology
