= Coralville Formation =

Geologic formation in Iowa, USA

- Stratigraphic range: Devonian
- Type: Formation
- Sub-units: Gizzard Creek Member

Location
- Country: United States
- Extent: Iowa and Minnesota

The Coralville Formation is a geologic formation in Iowa. It preserves fossils dating back to the Devonian period.

== See also ==
- List of fossiliferous stratigraphic units in Iowa
- Paleontology in Iowa
