= Lithographic limestone =

Type of limestone with hard fine grain

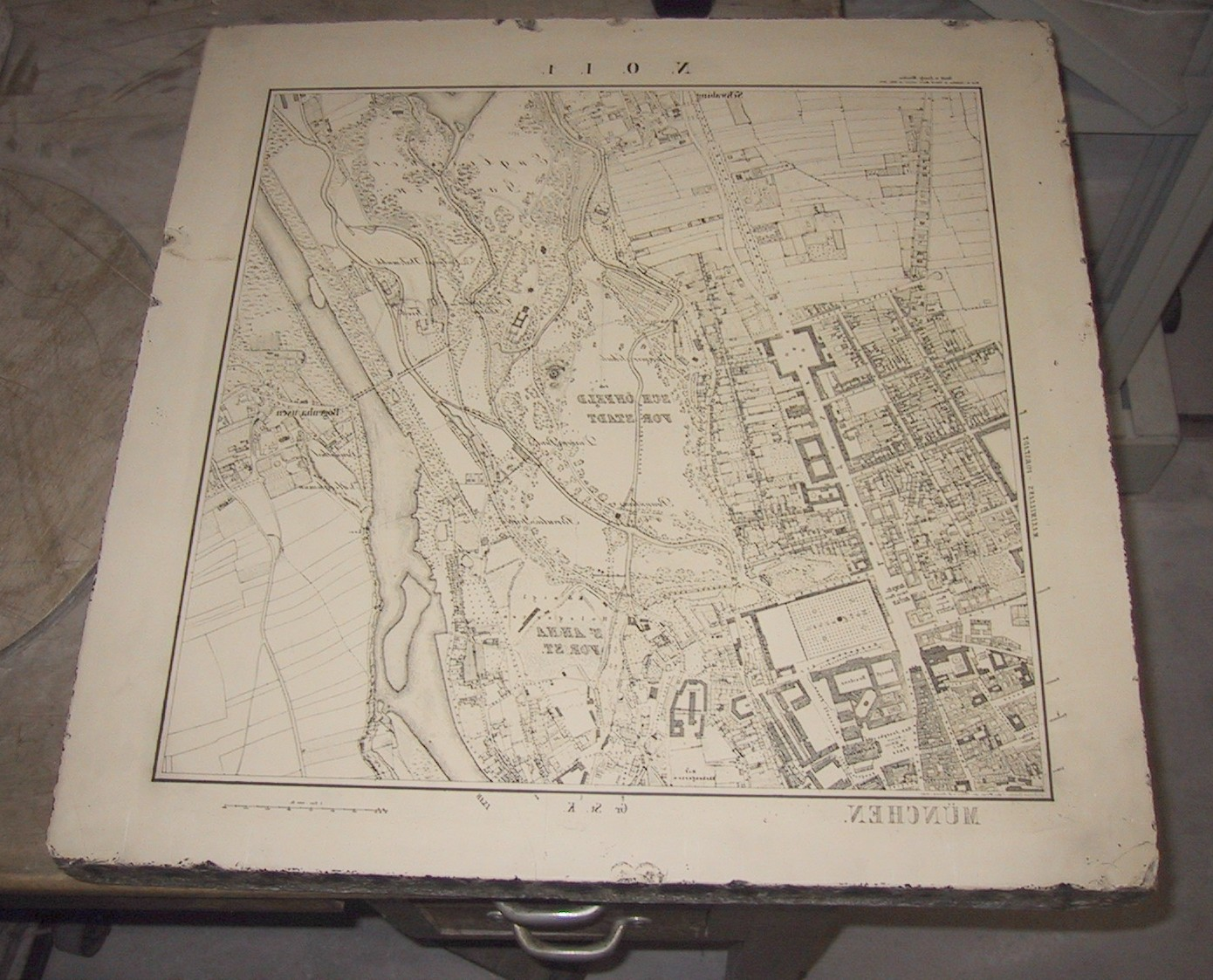
A lithographic limestone printing plate after use to print a map. Note the uniform fine texture of the stone.

Lithographic limestone is hard limestone that is sufficiently fine-grained, homogeneous and defect-free to be used for lithography.

Geologists use the term "lithographic texture" to refer to a grain size under 1/250 mm.

The term "sublithographic" is sometimes used for homogeneous fine-grained limestone with a somewhat coarser texture.

== Origin ==
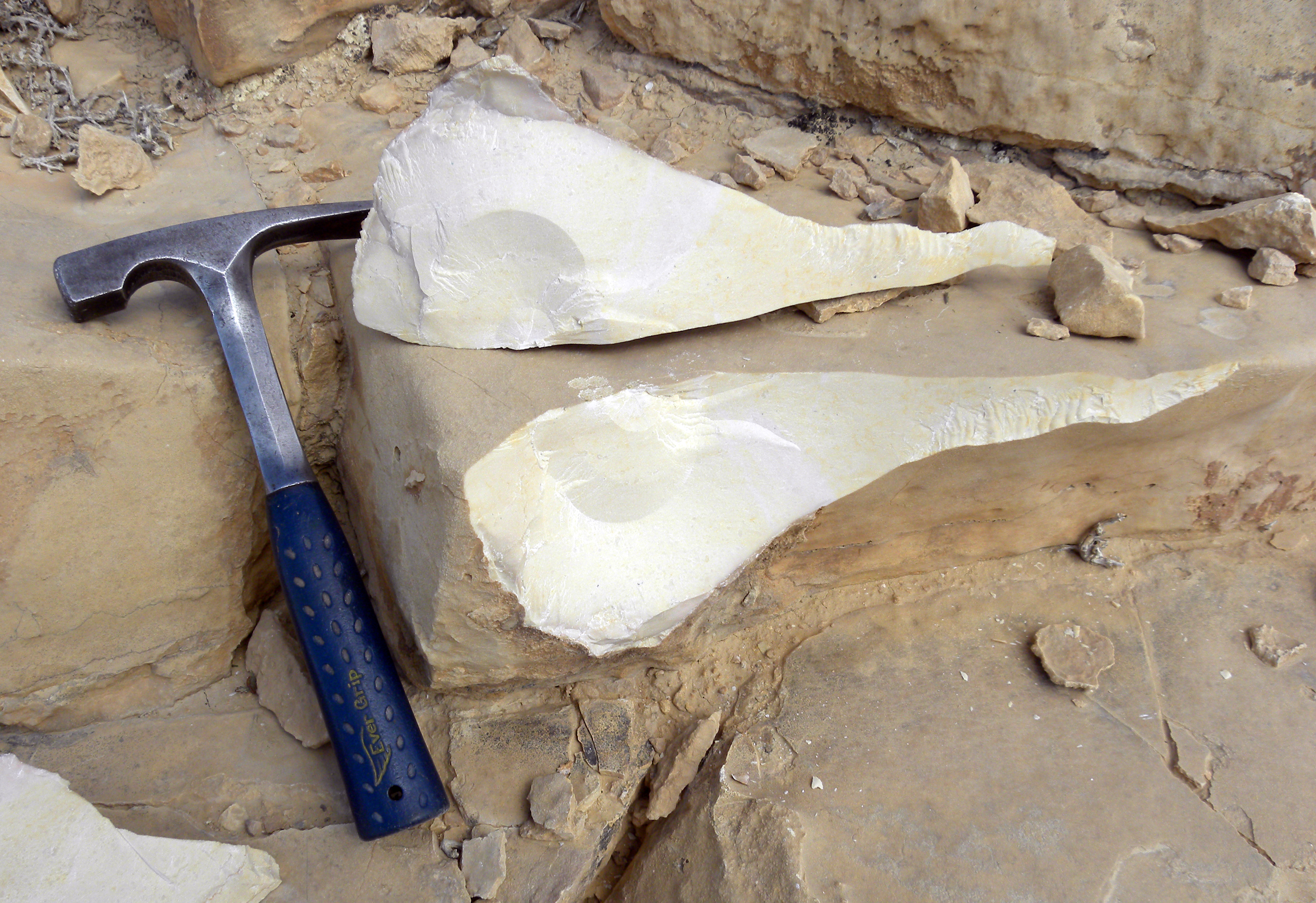
Meleke in the Gerofit Formation (Turonian) near Makhtesh Ramon, southern Israel; a type of lithographic limestone.

The generally accepted theory for the origin of lithographic and sublithographic limestones is that they were formed in shallow, stagnant, hypersaline, and anoxic lagoons. The combination of mild hypersalinity and low oxygen content is believed to have inhibited the formation of microbial mats and prevented the invasion of bottom dwelling organisms. Microbial mats and bottom dwelling organisms would have left fossils, and bottom dwelling organisms would have churned the accumulating sediment, producing a less homogeneous rock. Stagnancy was required to avoid churning or sculpting of the sediment by currents or wave action.

== Distribution ==
=== Europe ===
The original source for lithographic limestone was the Solnhofen Limestone, named after the quarries of Solnhofen where it was first found. This is a late Jurassic deposit, part of a deposit of plattenkalk (a very fine-grained limestone that splits into thin plates, usually micrite) that extends through the Swabian Alb and Franconian Alb in Southern Germany. Only a small fraction of plattenkalk is suitable for lithography.

For many years, the Solnhofen deposits were the only source of lithographic limestone. French lithographic limestone from quarries near Montdardier, about 6 km (3.7 mi) south of le Vigan, Gard was exhibited at the Great Exhibition of 1851, where it earned an honorable mention. This stone is from the upper Lias Group, from the early Jurassic. The largest lithographic printing stone ever quarried came from Le Vigan, 230 x 150cm (90 x 59 in). Théophile Steinlen used a comparable stone for some of his posters. Several quarries are visible today on the chalky plateau above Montdardier, between 2 km (1.2 mi) north (43°56′54.46″N 3°35′3.44″E), and 2 km west (43°55′52.61″N 3°33′38.78″E) of the town.

Shortly before 1867, a second lithographic limestone quarry was opened in France near Cerin and Crey, Isère (45°46′45.77″N 5°33′14.06″E). The lithographic limestones of Cerin are from the Kimmeridgian stage of the Upper Jurassic, and as with the Solnhofen deposits, they preserve numerous interesting fossils.

Lithographic limestone from the Lower Cretaceous has been quarried near Santa Maria de Meià on the south flank of the Serra del Montsec in Spain. In 1902, L. M. Vidal, a mining engineer, recognized the importance of the fossils found there.

=== The Americas ===
The American Lithographic Stone Company was organized in Louisville, Kentucky in late 1868. It initially focused its operation on quarries in Overton County, Tennessee, but shortly before 1900, it opened a quarry at Brandenburg, Kentucky. This quarry was the only commercial source of lithographic stone in the United States at the turn of the 20th century. Unlike the Solnhofen stone, Kentucky lithographic limestone was slightly dolomitic, and it was judged to be competitive with Solnhofen stone for some purposes, but not for the highest quality work. This stone source was sub-Carboniferous (Mississippian). In 1917, the Brandenburg quarry was judged the most important source of lithographic stone in the United States. Prior to 1916, the output of the Brandenburg quarry was small, but in 1916, as World War I cut off access to Solnhofen stone, the quarry produced 20 tons of finished lithographic stone. The Remains of the Brandenburg Lithograph Quarry are located along the Buttermilk Falls Historic Walking Trail (38°0′3.54″N 86°9′34.74″W).

In 1903, Clement L. Webster discovered a bed of lithographic limestone about 2 miles (3.2 km) southwest of Orchard, Iowa. His company, the Interstate Investment & Development Company platted a town named Lithograph City nearby and opened a quarry (43°11′38.2″N 92°48′59.52″W). The Lithograph City Formation of the Cedar Valley Group straddles the border between the Middle and Late Devonian and was named for its exposure in this quarry. Outcrops of this formation extend from near Cedar Falls, Iowa north into Minnesota. The suitability of Lithograph City limestone for lithography was tested by A. B. Hoen who reported that stone from two layers in the Lithograph City quarry was excellent for lithography and finer grained than the finest Solnhofen stone. Lithograph City was an important source of lithographic stone in the United States during World War I, but the quarries closed as metal printing plates replaced stone. In 1918, the Devonian Products Company took over the operation, focusing on the production of crushed rock and renaming the town Devonia. By 1938, the town had disappeared.

== See-also ==
- Ichnofabric index
- List of dinosaur-bearing rock formations
- List of types of limestone
