= Dubuque Formation =

Geologic formation in the United States

- Stratigraphic range: Ordovician
- Type: Formation
- Underlies: Maquoketa Formation
- Overlies: Galena Group

Location
- Region: Illinois, Minnesota
- Country: United States

The Dubuque Formation is a geologic formation in Illinois, Iowa, Wisconsin and Minnesota. It preserves fossils dating back to the Ordovician period. It comprises carbonate and argillaceous rocks that are between 35 and 45 feet deep.

== Texture ==
The texture of the Dubuque formation somewhat resembles old bricks as large hard slabs of limestone are present with soft "Mortar" like rocks linking all of these slabs together. It has some fossils but a lot less than the underlieing Stewartville Formation,

== See also ==
- List of fossiliferous stratigraphic units in Illinois
- List of fossiliferous stratigraphic units in Iowa
- List of fossiliferous stratigraphic units in Minnesota
- List of fossiliferous stratigraphic units in Wisconsin
