= Maynes Creek Formation =

Geologic formation in Iowa, United States

- Stratigraphic range: Carboniferous
- Type: Formation

Location
- Region: Iowa
- Country: United States

The Maynes Creek Formation is a geologic formation in Iowa. It preserves fossils dating back to the Carboniferous period.

== See also ==
- List of fossiliferous stratigraphic units in Iowa
- Paleontology in Iowa
