= Gower Formation =

Geologic formation in Iowa and Illinois, USA

- Stratigraphic range: Silurian
- Type: Formation
- Underlies: Unconformity Devonian
- Overlies: Scotch Grove Formation

Lithology
- Primary: dolomite

Location
- Region: Illinois and Iowa
- Country: United States

The Gower Formation is a geologic formation in Illinois and Iowa. It preserves fossils dating back to the Silurian period.

== See also ==
- List of fossiliferous stratigraphic units in Illinois
- List of fossiliferous stratigraphic units in Iowa
