= Windrow Formation =

Geologic formation in Minnesota

- Stratigraphic range: Cretaceous
- Type: Formation

Location
- Region: Minnesota
- Country: United States

The Windrow Formation is a geologic formation in Minnesota named after Windrow Bluff on Fort McCoy, Monroe County, Wisconsin. It preserves fossils dating back to the Cretaceous period.

== See also ==
- List of fossiliferous stratigraphic units in Minnesota
- Paleontology in Minnesota
