= Saturday Mountain Formation =

Geologic formation in Iowa and Idaho, USA

- Stratigraphic range: Ordovician
- Type: Formation

Location
- Region: Idaho; Iowa
- Country: United States

The Saturday Mountain Formation is a geologic formation in Idaho and Iowa.

It preserves fossils dating back to the Ordovician period.

== See also ==
- List of fossiliferous stratigraphic units in Idaho
- List of fossiliferous stratigraphic units in Iowa
