= Elgin Formation =

Geologic formation in Minnesota, United States

- Stratigraphic range: Ordovician
- Type: Formation

Location
- Region: Minnesota
- Country: United States

The Elgin Formation is a geological formation in Minnesota. It preserves fossils dating back to the Ordovician period.

== See also ==
- List of fossiliferous stratigraphic units in Minnesota
- Paleontology in Minnesota
