= Spillville Formation =

Geologic formation in Iowa and Minnesota, United States

- Stratigraphic range: Devonian
- Type: Formation

Location
- Country: United States
- Extent: Iowa and Minnesota

The Spillville Formation is a geologic formation in Iowa and southeastern Minnesota. It preserves fossils dating back to the Devonian period.

== See also ==
- List of fossiliferous stratigraphic units in Iowa
- Paleontology in Iowa
