= Hopkinton Dolomite =

Geologic formation in the United States

- Stratigraphic range: Silurian
- Type: Formation

Location
- Region: Iowa
- Country: United States

The Hopkinton Dolomite is a geologic formation in Iowa. It preserves fossils dating back to the Silurian period.

== See also ==
- List of fossiliferous stratigraphic units in Iowa
- Paleontology in Iowa
