= Cummingsville Formation =

Geologic formation in Iowa, USA

- Stratigraphic range: Ordovician
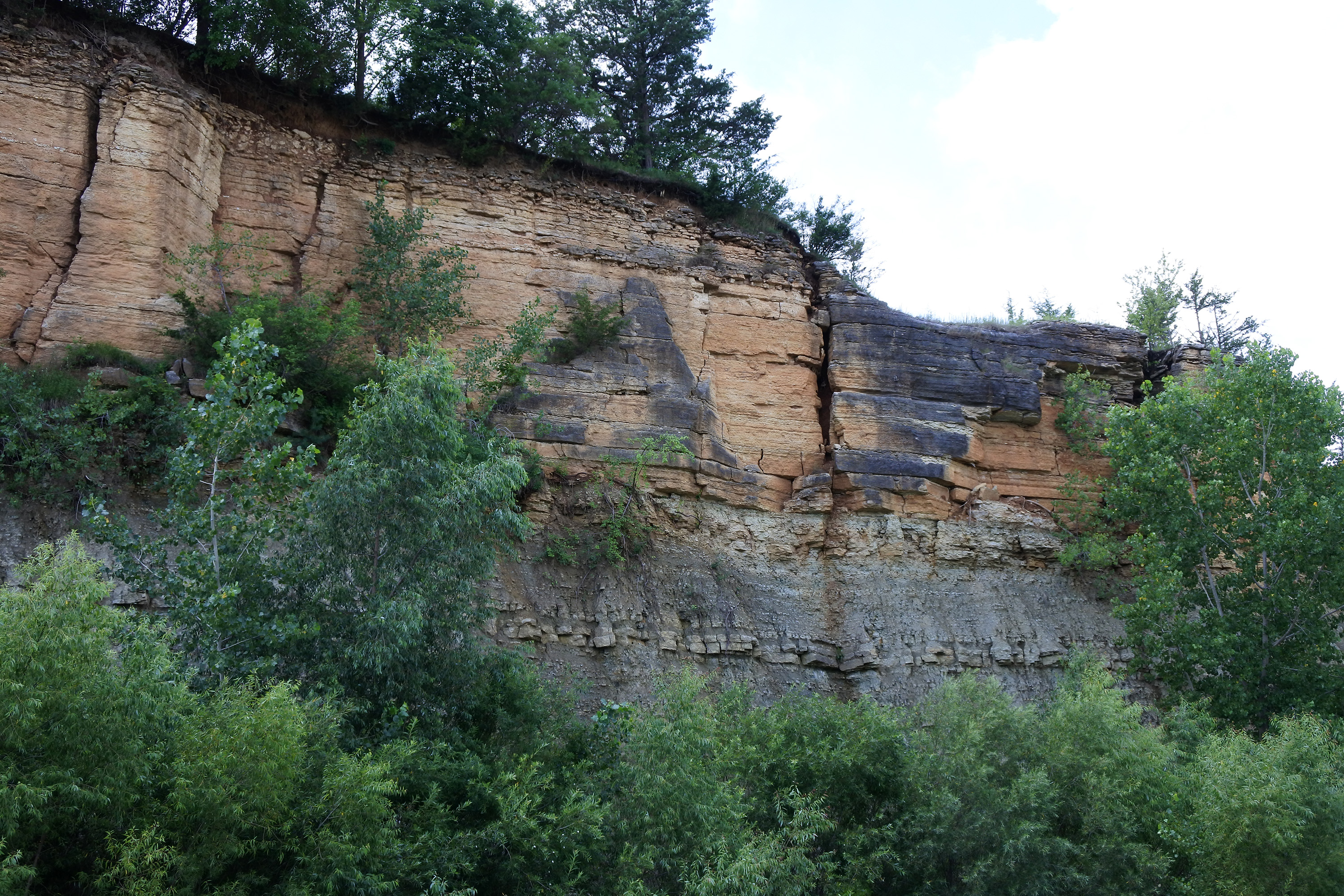
- Cummingsville Formation in Decorah, Iowa. The Cummingsville is the brown upper unit; the Decorah Shale is below.
- Type: Formation
- Overlies: Decorah Shale

Location
- Country: United States
- Extent: Iowa and Minnesota

The Cummingsville Formation is a geologic formation in Iowa and Minnesota. It preserves fossils dating back to the Ordovician period.

== See also ==
- List of fossiliferous stratigraphic units in Iowa
- Paleontology in Iowa
