= A. Hoen & Co. =

Former Baltimore, Maryland, US lithography firm

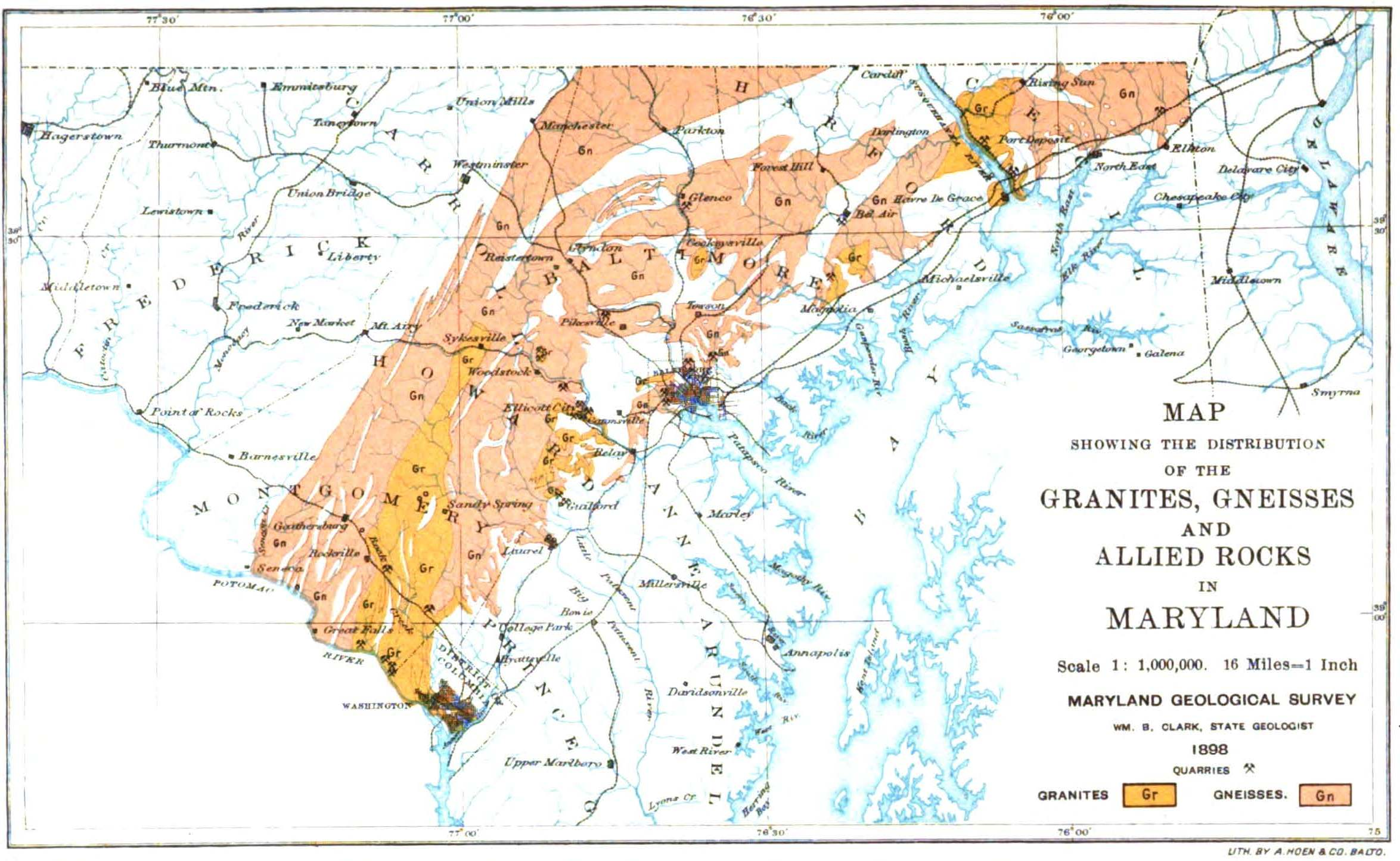
Lithograph by A. Hoen & Co.: A map of Granites and Gneisses in Maryland (1898)

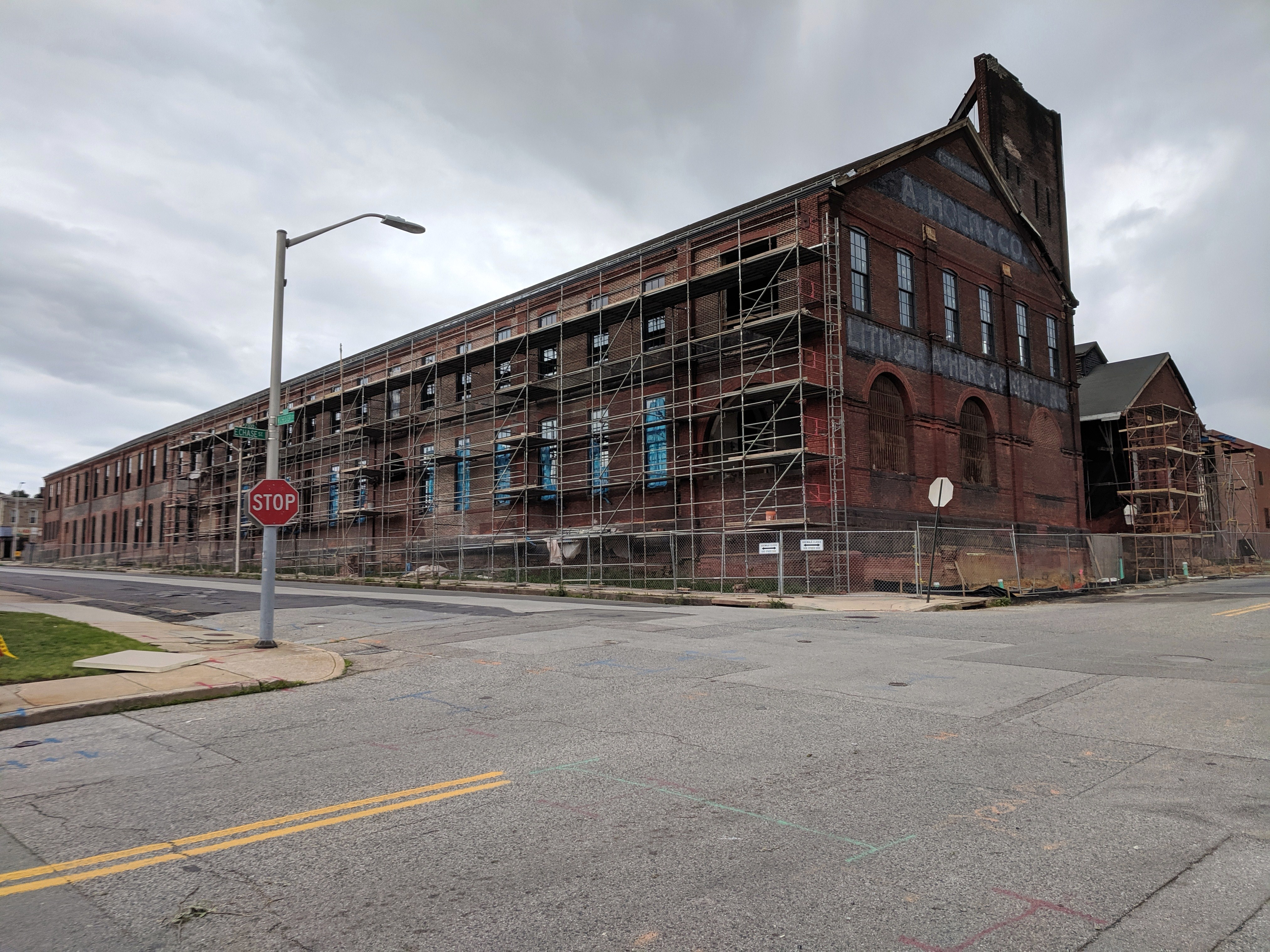
The A. Hoen & Co. Lithograph Building in Broadway East, May 2019.

A. Hoen & Co. was a Baltimore, Maryland-based lithography firm founded by Edward Weber in 1835 as E. Weber & Company. When August Hoen took it over following Weber's death, he changed the name and built the company into one of the most prominent in the industry at the time. In 1877, Hoen entered a print produced by his patented lithocaustic process in the Centennial Exposition. This work, entitled "The Continentals" was "commended for excellence in chromo-lithographic art" by the judges.

August Hoen patented his lithocaustic method (originally spelled lithokaustik) in 1860. This covered etching with a mix of citric acid and gum arabic so that the lithographer could see the progress of shaded patterns as they were etched into the stone. He continued to explore methods of producing fine gradations in shading. In 1880, August Hoen was granted several patents for a methods of producing halftone prints using lithography.

Albert Hoen, August's son, was not only an accomplished printmaker, but he also maintained a laboratory for testing lithographic limestone and carried out laboratory tests and experimental print runs using stones from promising new sources.
