= Manistique Formation =

- Stratigraphic range: Silurian
- Type: Formation

Location
- Region: Wisconsin
- Country: United States

The Manistique Formation is a geologic formation in Wisconsin. It preserves fossils dating back to the Silurian period.

== See also ==
- List of fossiliferous stratigraphic units in Wisconsin
- Paleontology in Wisconsin
