= Neda Formation =

Illinois geologic formation

- Stratigraphic range: Ordovician
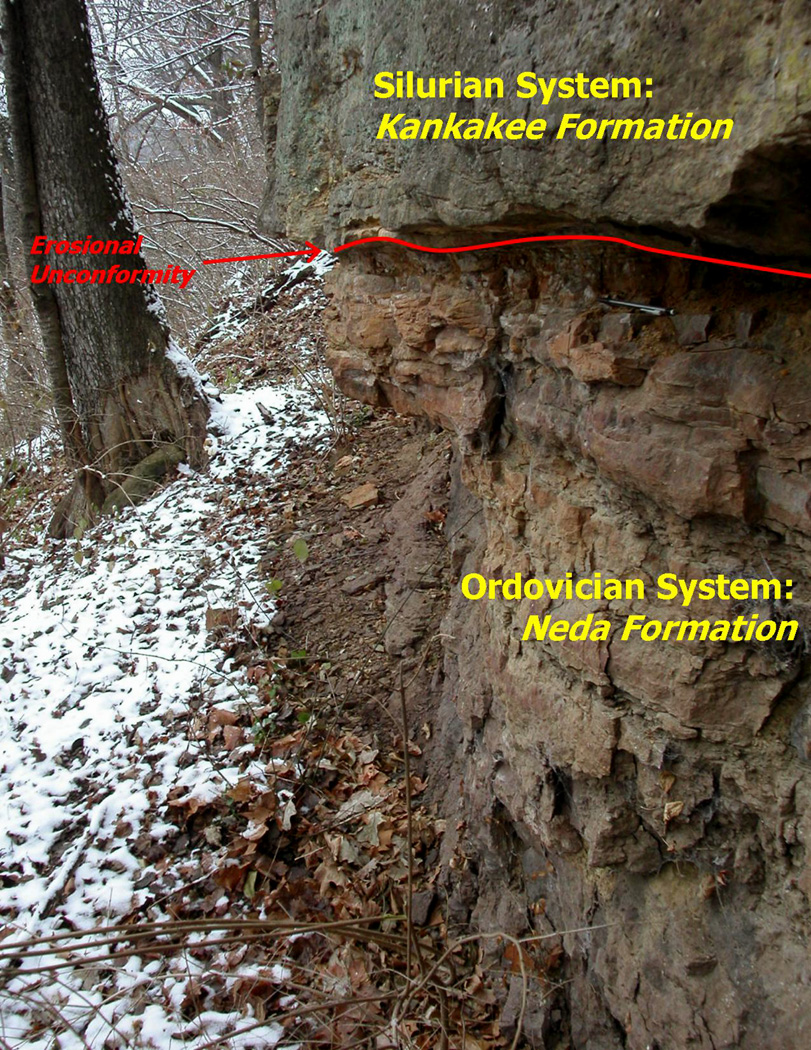
- Neda Formation (Ordovician) below Kankakee Formation (Silurian) in Illinois
- Type: Formation
- Unit of: Maquoketa Group

Location
- Region: Illinois and Wisconsin
- Country: United States

The Neda Formation is a geologic formation in Illinois. It preserves fossils dating back to the Ordovician period.

== See also ==
- List of fossiliferous stratigraphic units in Illinois
