= Mifflin Formation =

Geologic formation in the United States

- Stratigraphic range: Ordovician
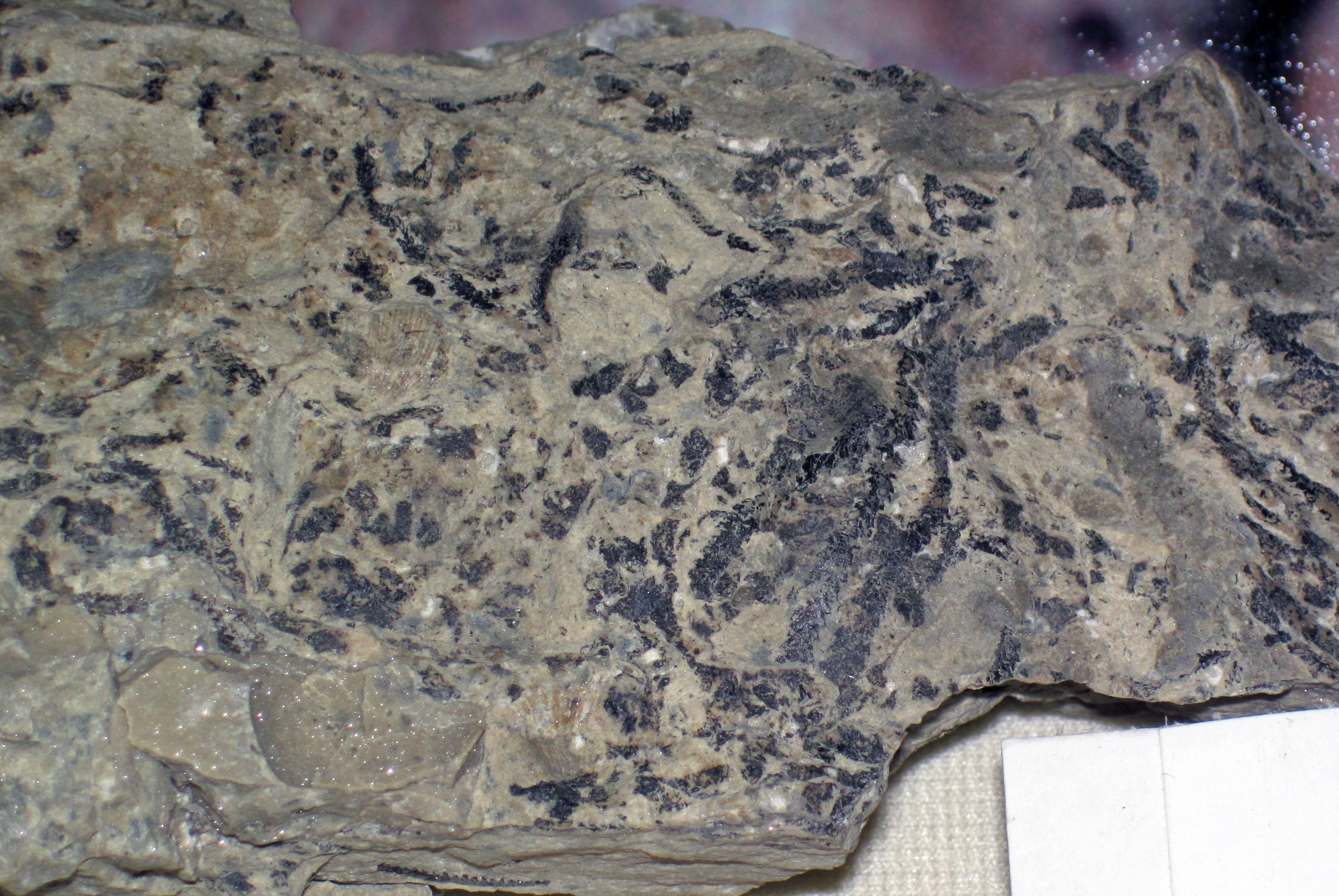
- Fossils from the Mifflin Formation (Lee County, Illinois)
- Type: Formation

Location
- Region: Illinois, Wisconsin, Iowa
- Country: United States

The Mifflin Formation is a fossil bearing geologic formation in Illinois dating to the Ordovician period.

== See also ==
- List of fossiliferous stratigraphic units in Illinois
