= Cedar Valley Group =

Geologic group in Iowa and Illinois

- Stratigraphic range: Devonian
- Type: Group
- Overlies: Wapsipinicon Group

Location
- Region: Iowa and Illinois
- Country: United States

The Cedar Valley Group is a geologic group in Iowa and Illinois. It preserves fossils dating back to the Devonian period.

== See also ==
- List of fossiliferous stratigraphic units in Iowa
- List of fossiliferous stratigraphic units in Illinois
