= Galena Group =

Sedimentary sequence of Ordovician limestone

- Stratigraphic range: Darriwilian-Sandbian
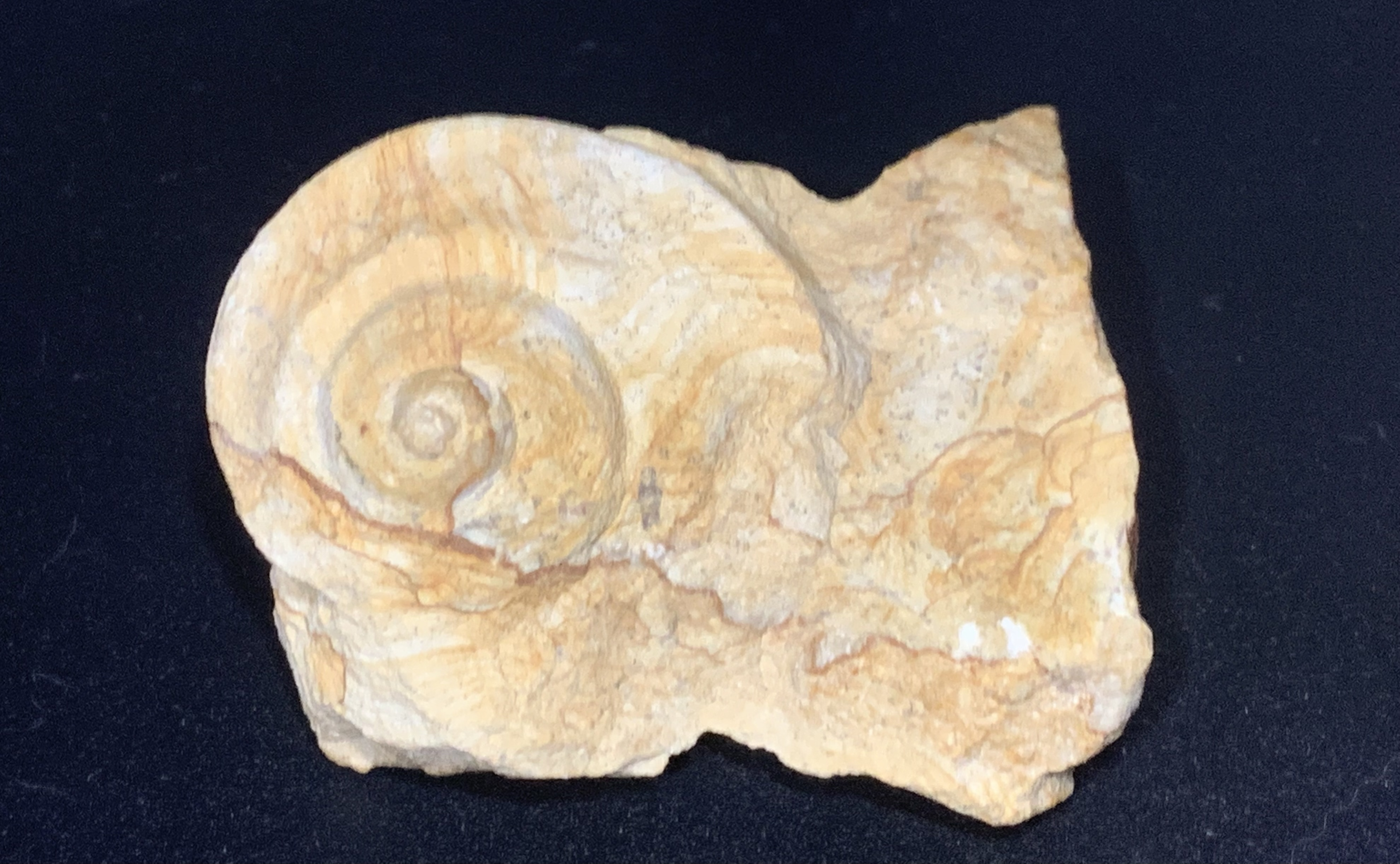
- Unidentified Trochonema from the Galena Group
- Type: Group
- Sub-units: Decorah Shale, Dunleith Formation, Wise Lake Formation, Dubuque Formation
- Underlies: Maquoketa Group
- Overlies: Platteville Limestone

Location
- Country: United States
- Extent: Minnesota, Wisconsin and Illinois

The Galena Group or Galena Limestone refers to a sedimentary sequence of Ordovician limestone that was deposited atop the Decorah Shale. It is part of the Ordovician stratigraphy of the Upper Midwestern United States. It was deposited in a calm marine environment, and is fossiliferous.
