= Dunleith Formation =

Geologic formation in the United States

- Stratigraphic range: Ordovician
- Type: Formation
- Unit of: Galena Group

Location
- Region: Illinois, Iowa, Missouri, Wisconsin
- Country: United States

The Dunleith Formation is a geologic formation in Illinois. It preserves fossils dating back to the Ordovician period.

== See also ==
- List of fossiliferous stratigraphic units in Illinois
