= Prosser Limestone =

Geologic formation in the US

- Stratigraphic range: Ordovician
- Type: Formation
- Sub-units: Clitambonites Member

Location
- Region: Illinois, Wisconsin, Iowa, Manitoba
- Country: United States, Canada

The Prosser Limestone is a geologic formation in Illinois, USA. It preserves fossils dating back to the Ordovician period.

== See also ==
- List of fossiliferous stratigraphic units in Illinois
