= Glenwood Formation =

Geologic formation in Illinois, United States of America

- Stratigraphic range: Ordovician
- Type: Formation

Location
- Country: United States
- Extent: Illinois and Minnesota

The Glenwood Formation is a geologic formation in Illinois. It preserves fossils dating back to the Ordovician period.

== See also ==
- List of fossiliferous stratigraphic units in Illinois
