= Ion Formation =

Geologic formation in Illinois

- Stratigraphic range: Ordovician
- Type: Formation

Location
- Region: Illinois
- Country: United States

The Ion Formation is a geologic formation in Illinois. It preserves fossils dating back to the Ordovician period.

== See also ==
- List of fossiliferous stratigraphic units in Illinois
