= Decorah Shale =

Geologic formation in the United States

- Stratigraphic range: Ordovician
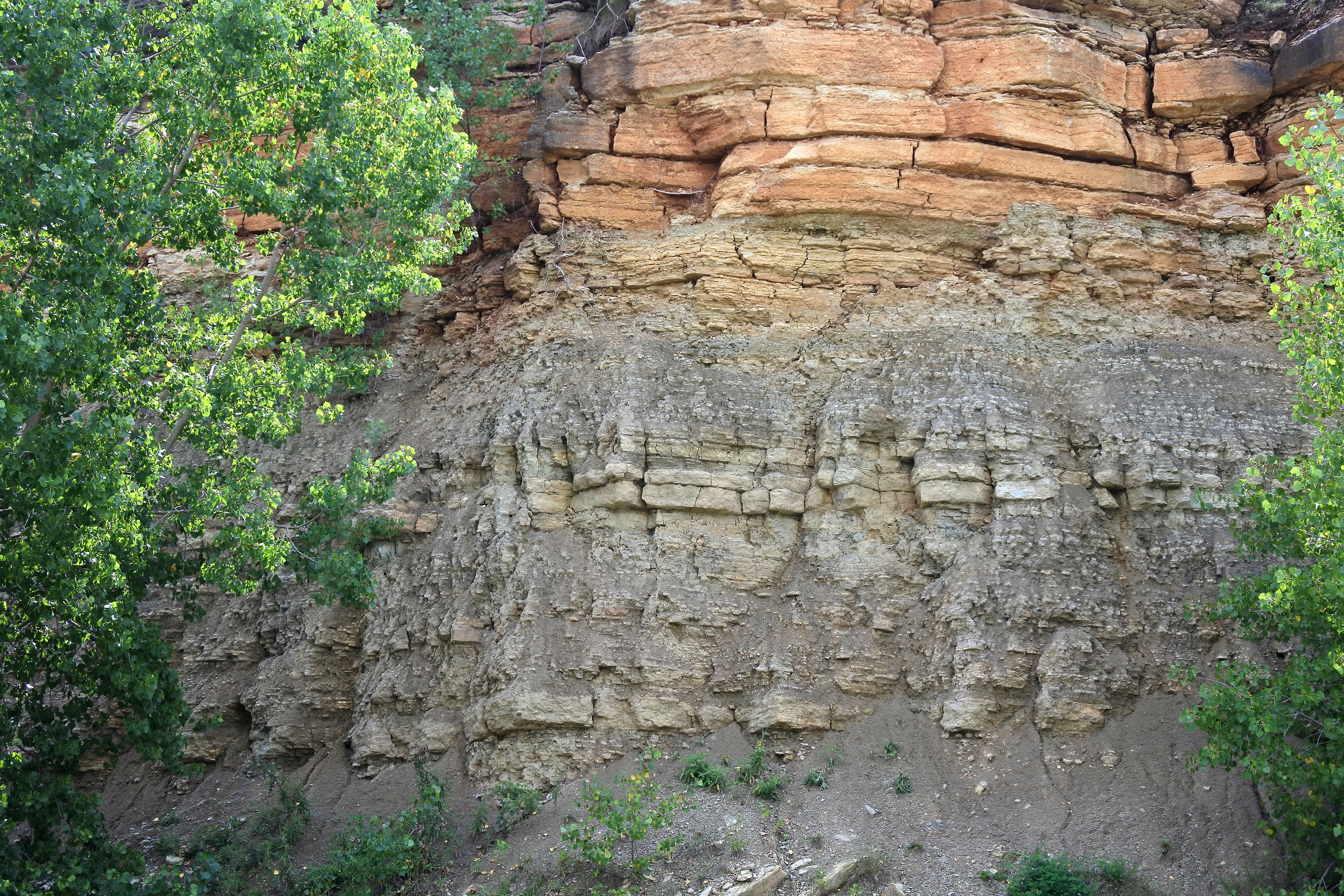
- Decorah Shale exposed in Decorah, Iowa. The Decorah is gray; above it is the brown Cummingsville Formation.
- Type: Formation
- Underlies: Galena Group
- Overlies: Platteville Formation

Location
- Region: Missouri, Iowa, Illinois, Minnesota, Nebraska, South Dakota, Wisconsin
- Country: United States

The Decorah Shale is a fossiliferous shale that makes up the lowermost formation in the Galena Group. The Decorah lies above the Platteville Limestone and below the Cummingsville Formation in the sedimentary sequence that formed from the shallow sea that covered central North America during Ordovician Time. The Decorah consists of three members (from bottom to top): Spechts Ferry, Guttenberg, and Ion. The Spechts Ferry member is organic-rich and suggests a large influx of terrigenous sediment during deposition. The Guttenberg is characterized by nodular calcareous beds and contains several K-bentonite deposits. The Ion Member, present in the southern Decorah in Iowa, is characterized by alternating beds of shale and limestone.

Where it crops out in the Upper Midwest, especially in the Twin Cities, the Decorah is a popular stratum for amateur fossil collecting. It contains trilobites, brachiopods, horn corals, gastropods, crinoids, and large numbers of bryozoans. Cephalopods may also be found in the lower layers of the Decorah Shale.
