= Maquoketa Group =

Assemblage of geological formations in central USA

The Maquoketa Group is an assemblage of several geologic formations. It is Upper Ordovician in age and named for the Maquoketa River in Iowa. It exists in Missouri, Wisconsin, Iowa, Illinois, and Indiana.

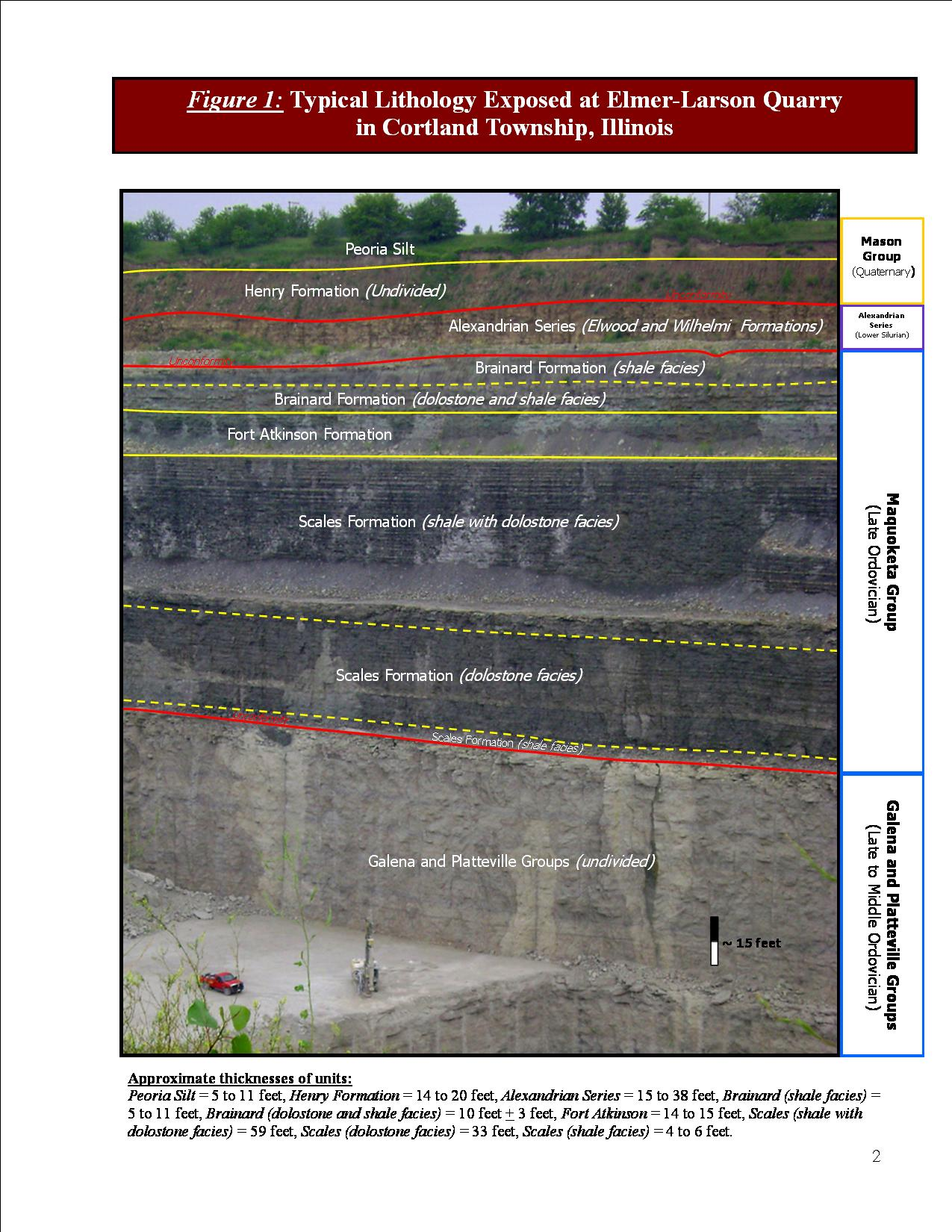

It is equivalent to the all but the basal formations of the Cincinnati Group in Ohio. Illinois and Indiana are the only states where the Maquoketa is considered a group. In other states it is a formation. The Maquoketa was deposited in a shallow intercontinental sea. Most of the clastic sediments are derived from the Appalachians, which were being raised at the end of the Ordovician. To a lesser degree some of the sediments were derived from the Ozark highlands to the southwest.

== Scales Formation ==
In Illinois, the basal formation is called the Scales Formation and consists mainly of dark brown and gray dolomitic shale. In north central Illinois, the bottom half is dominantly a yellowish gray coarse crystalline dolomite (rock form of the mineral dolomite which is related to calcite). It does not contain many fossils, although large trilobites and large cephalopods are known from Elmer-Lason Quarry. It is typically 75 to 100 feet thick. It is the only formation of the Maquoketa Group that is not exposed in northeastern Illinois.

The type section for the Scales Formation is in Jo Daviess County, Illinois. In Illinois the Formation is divided into two members, the lower Elgin Member (mostly dark gray to brown and black shale with dolomite) and the upper Clermont Member (upper gray pure shale) both with type sections in Fayette County, Iowa. However, in Iowa the Scales, Elgin, and Clermont are all members of the Maquoketa Formation (the Maquoketa is not considered a group in Iowa). Over the years, this has slowly led to the Scales being used in Eastern Iowa for the dark shale and the Elgin used in Western Iowa to refer to the dolomite that grades laterally into the Scales. The difference in terms between Iowa and Illinois has made the present nomenclature all but impractical. There is an active effort to revise the nomenclature. Present studies suggest that the Maquoketa should remain a group and not a formation for practical purposes.

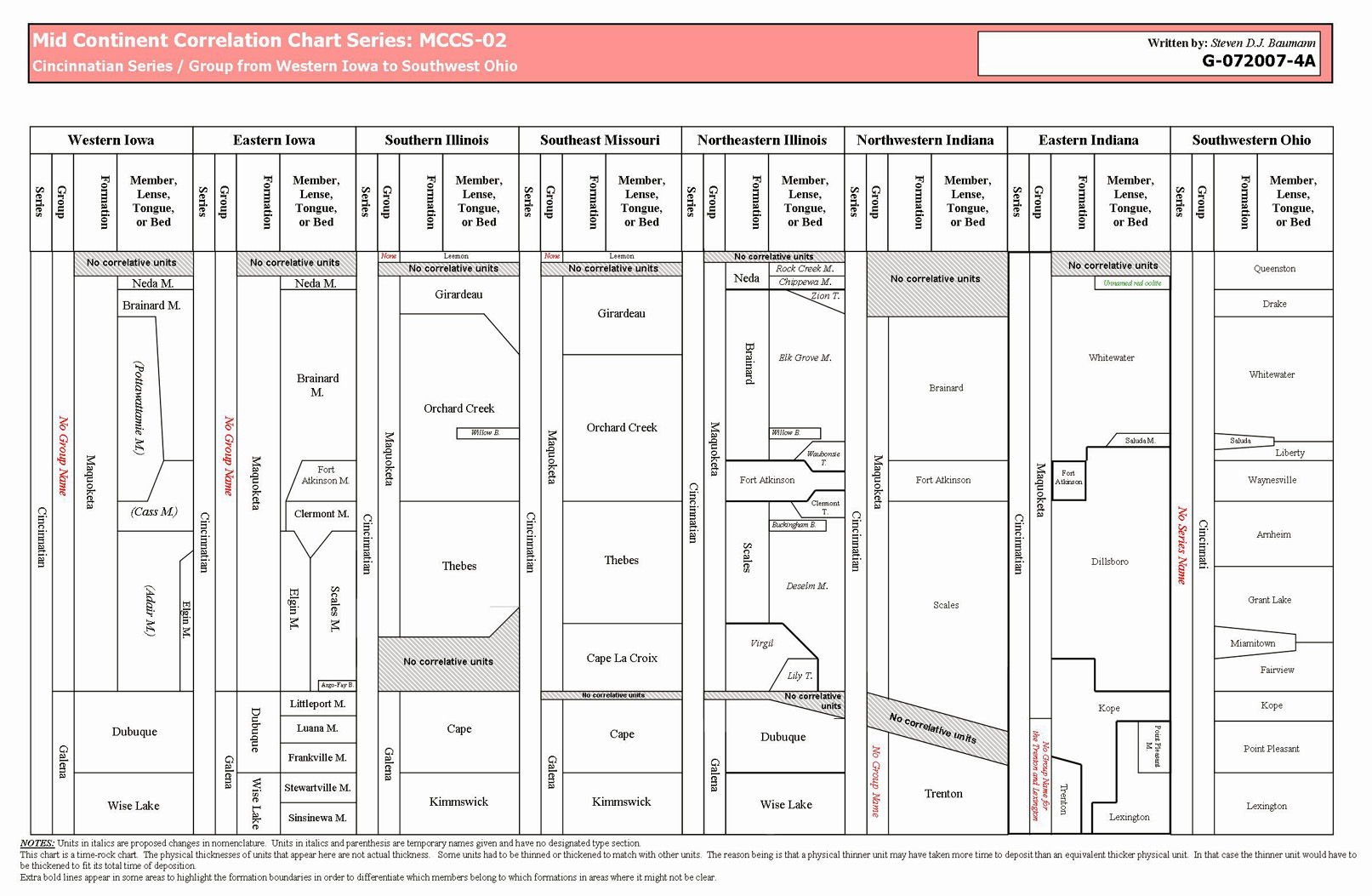
This table shows equivalent rock units within neighboring states around Illinois.

== Fort Atkinson Formation ==
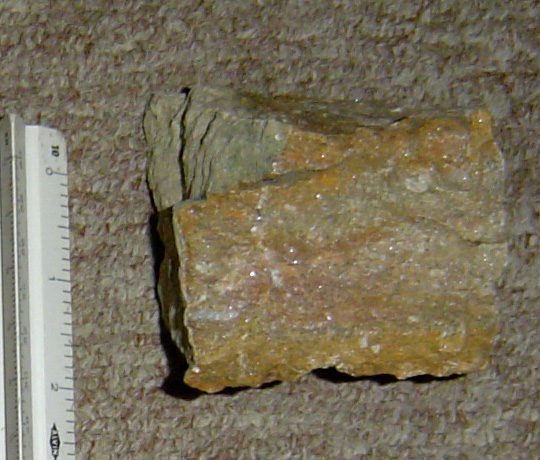
A piece of the Fort Atkinson along Aux Sable Creek in Illinois, showing the coarse texture and multitude of colors.

Overlying the Scales Formation is the Fort Atkinson Formation, which has been informally called the Middle or Divine Limestone by drillers. The Fort Atkinson is a dominantly a red, gray, and white coarse crystalline dolomite with thin beds of green and gray shale. It contains many invertebrate fossils, such as brachiopods and abundant corals. It ranges from 0 to 60 feet in thickness but is typically 40 to 50 feet thick.

== Brainard Formation ==
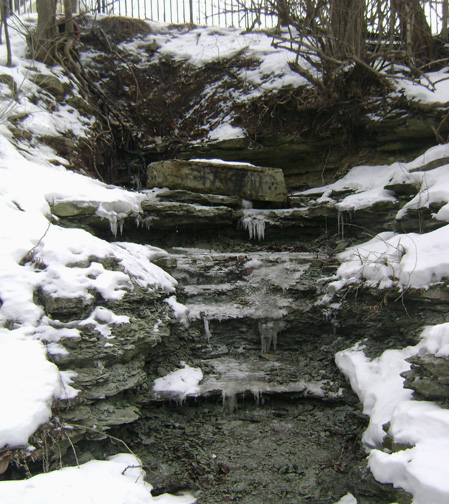
Waubonsie Creek in Oswego, Illinois. The greenish rock under the concrete block at top center is the base of the Brainard and is dominantly a sticky green shale with thin beds of purplish gray dolomite.

Above the Fort Atkinson is the Brainard Formation. The Brainard is generally a greenish gray to gray dolomitic soft to hard shale. It contains abundant fossils near the base. It ranges from 0 to 100 feet thick. The variable thickness is due to an erosional unconformity caused by an ice age at the end of the Ordovician, which lowered global sea level.

== Neda Formation ==
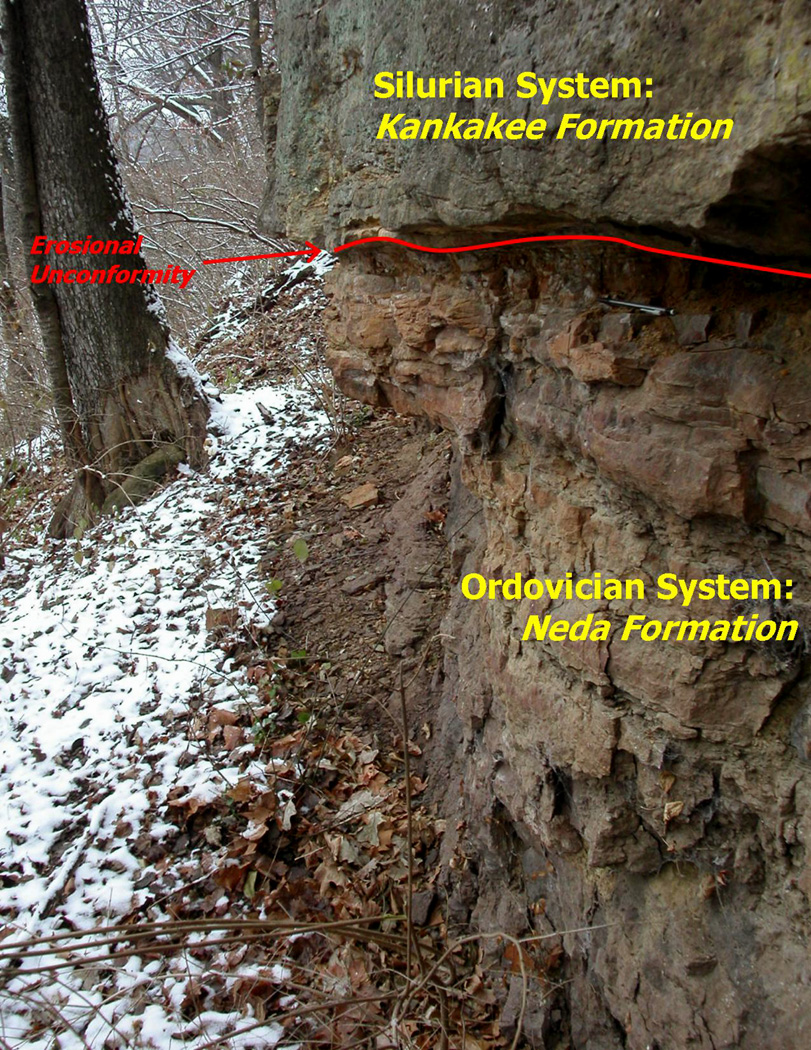
At Kankakee River State Park. The black pencil near the right center of the picture is near the Silurian-Ordovician contact.

The top and youngest formation is the Neda Formation. It exists in small patchy areas and was extensively eroded at the end of the Ordovician. It exists in large isolated patches in the subsurface in Lake, Cook, Will and Du Page counties in Illinois. In Illinois it crops out only at Kankakee River State Park. It is a reddish purple to brown oolitic shale and is sometimes cemented with iron and dolomite. The oolites are black and made of iron oxides instead of the typical calcareous oolites. They are about 0.5 millimeters in diameter. There are no known fossils. In Illinois, it can be as much as 16 feet thick but it is typically no more than 8 feet thick.

Its origin is still debated. We do know that it was deposited near or on an ancient shore and is a sedimentary rock. However, iron oolites are not being actively deposited anywhere in the world today. It is possible that it was originally deposited as a calcareous oolite and hematite later replaced the calcite. Or it could have been deposited directly as an iron oolite. There is strong evidence for both theories.

== Economic uses ==
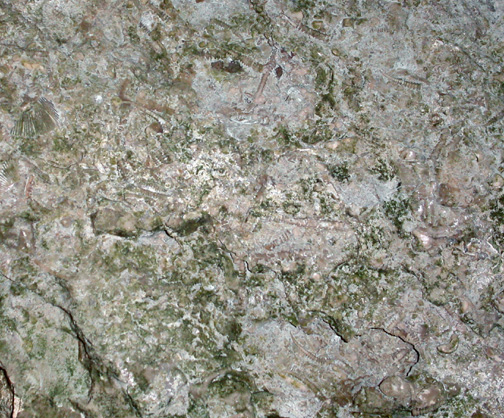
Tentaculites oswegoensis

The Maquoketa has almost no economic use since it is dominantly a weak shale interbedded with thin dolomite, it is not good for track ballast or concrete aggregate and is often stripped and piled as waste in open-pit quarries. The main exception is at the Neda's type section in Wisconsin, where it was once mined for iron ore. In Illinois the Neda is too thin and patchy to be economic. The Brainard is too soft to be used as anything other than fill soil. The Fort Atkinson is used to a limited degree as a decorative stone. The Scales is buried too deep and contains too much dolomite to be used for oil shale.

The unit has been identified as a massive hydrocarbon reservoir. Recently legislation was passed in Illinois allowing horizontal drilling in the shale.

The Maquoketa group is also a major aquitard. This means that it is very impermeable, and therefore water only measurably flows through it on geologic time-scales. For this reason, it cannot serve as a source of groundwater.

Although not useful to industry, it does contain rare and diverse fossils, some of which are only known in Illinois such as Tentaculites oswegoensis, a small unclassified fossil named after Oswego, Illinois and found in the basal Brainard.
