= Paleontology in Iowa =

Paleontological research in the U.S. state of Iowa

The location of the state of Iowa

Paleontology in Iowa refers to paleontological research occurring within or conducted by people from the U.S. state of Iowa. The paleozoic fossil record of Iowa spans from the Cambrian to Mississippian. During the early Paleozoic Iowa was covered by a shallow sea that would later be home to creatures like brachiopods, bryozoans, cephalopods, corals, fishes, and trilobites. Later in the Paleozoic, this sea left the state, but a new one covered Iowa during the early Mesozoic. As this sea began to withdraw a new subtropical coastal plain environment which was home to duck-billed dinosaurs spread across the state. Later this plain was submerged by the rise of the Western Interior Seaway, where plesiosaurs lived. The early Cenozoic is missing from the local rock record, but during the Ice Age evidence indicates that glaciers entered the state, which was home to mammoths and mastodons.

== Prehistory ==
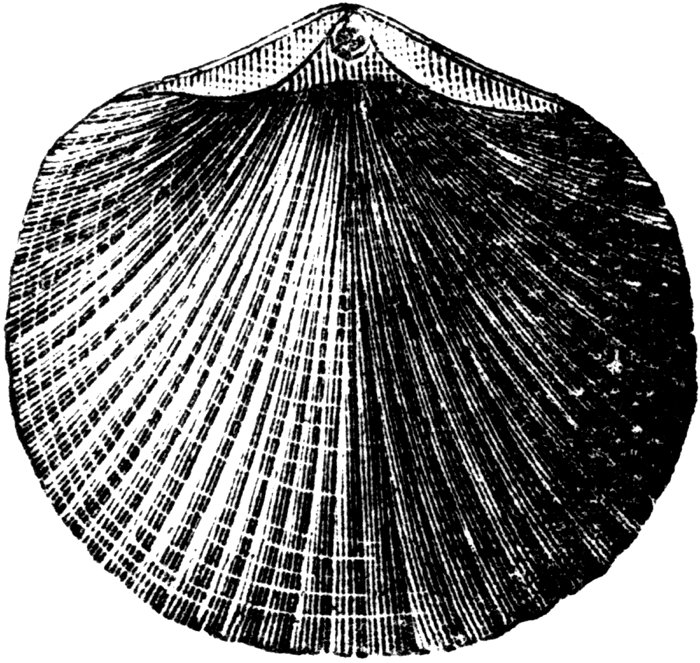
Atrypa.

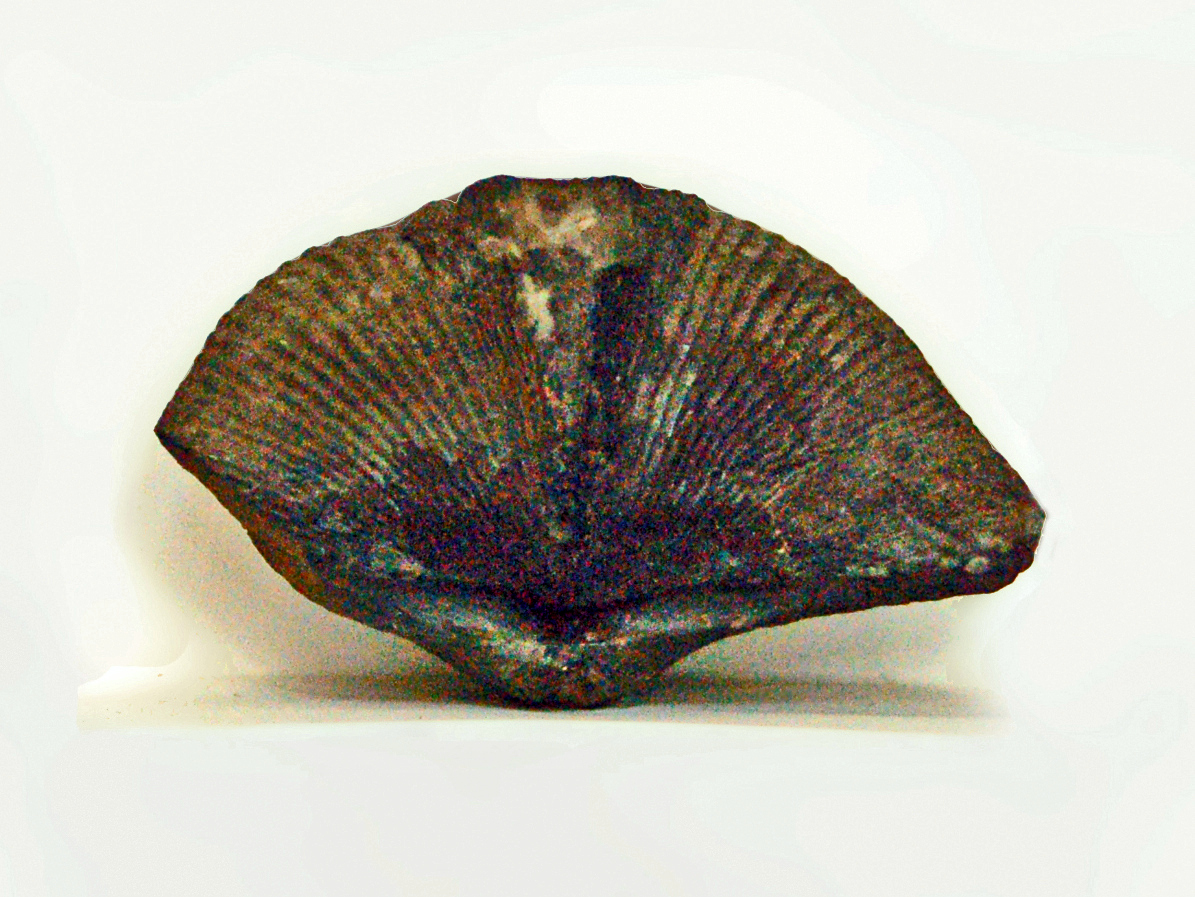
Spirifer.

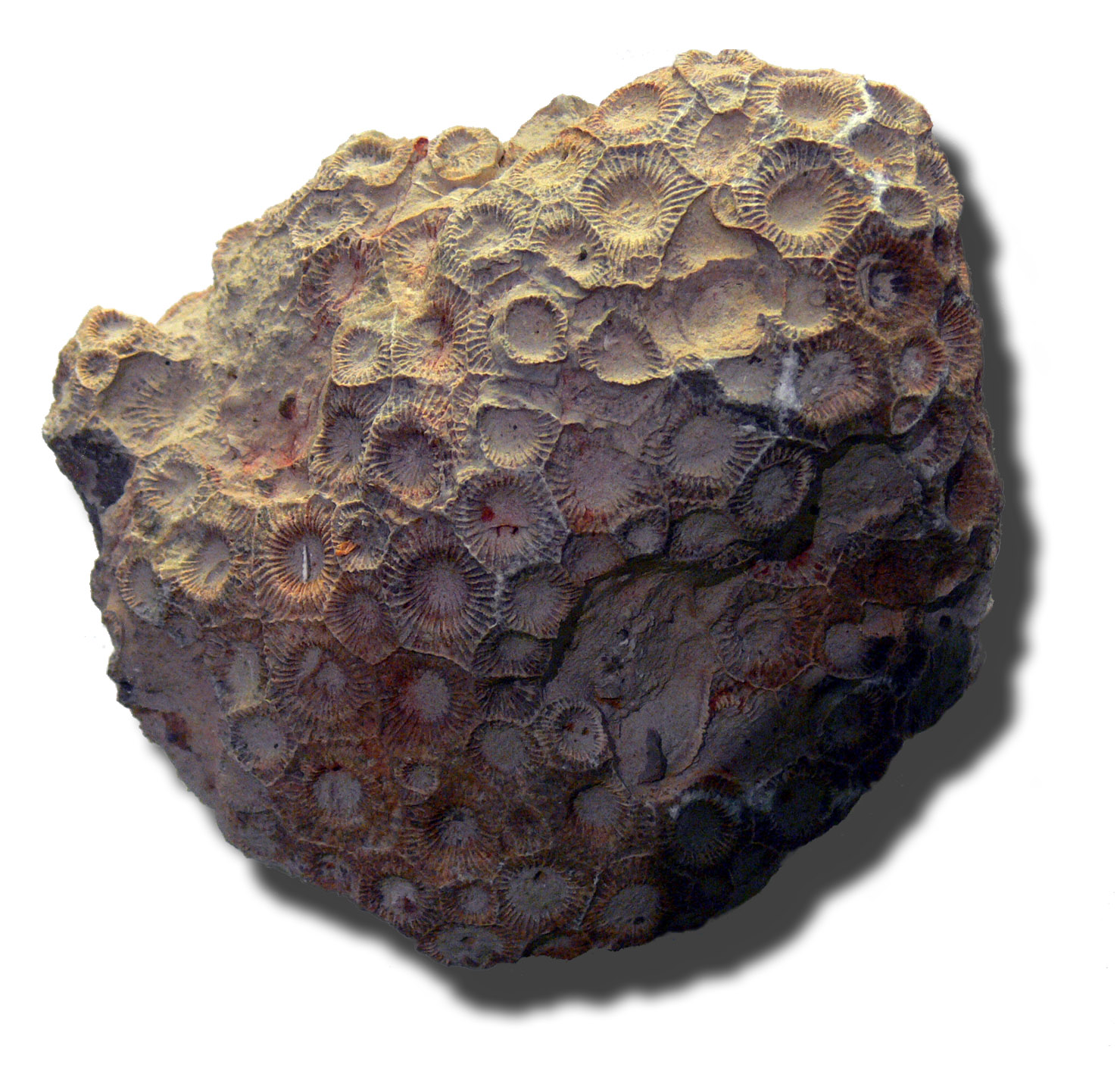
Hexagonaria.

No Precambrian fossils are known from Iowa, so the fossil record does not begin until the Paleozoic. During the early Paleozoic, most of Iowa was submerged by an ancient sea. The bottom of this sea was home to creatures like brachiopods, bryozoans, cephalopods, corals, molluscs, and trilobites. The life of Mississippian Iowa included blastoids, brachiopods, coral, crinoids, and starfish. Blastoids from this time period left behind remains in what is now the southeastern part of the state. Brachiopods from this time period left behind remains in what is now the southeastern Benton County and the southeastern part of the state. The Benton County brachiopods included Atrypa and Spirifer. Corals of Mississippian Iowa included the colonial Hexagonaria of southeastern Benton County. Crinoids left behind remains in what are now the Le Grand area and the southeastern part of the state. Some of the Le Grand crinoids are rare in other places. Some of the Le Grand starfishes are rare in other places. Vertebrate life included fishes. Fish teeth of this time period fossilized in the southeastern part of the state. As the Paleozoic drew to a close, Iowa's sea's dried up. For a significant length of time sediments were being eroded away from the state rather than deposited.

During the early Mesozoic, a new sea covered Iowa, and sediment deposition resumed. As this sea withdrew later in the Mesozoic Iowa became a subtropical coastal plain with rivers interspersed throughout. Later, dinosaurs lived and left behind fossil remains in Iowa, although the record of their presence is scant. Further, dinosaur fossils have been found in neighboring states like Minnesota, Missouri, Nebraska, and South Dakota. There were no barriers that would have prevented the dinosaurs of this region from crossing what are now the state boundaries. No Jurassic dinosaur fossils are known from Iowa, although the Iowan Fort Dodge Formation is the same age as the dinosaur-bearing deposits of the western states.

Cretaceous deposits cover a wider area of Iowa than those of Jurassic age. Between 95 and 100 million years ago, areas of Iowa were covered by a complex of rivers flowing toward the west through floodplains and coastal lowlands. These deposited the sediments that are now called the Dakota Formation, the oldest Cretaceous rocks in the state. Global temperatures were elevated and Iowa was richly vegetated by a subtropical flora. Unlike the Jurassic deposits, dinosaur fossils were preserved in these rocks. At least one kind of primitive hadrosaur that left behind remains in Iowa was more than 30 feet long.

Gradually over time the rivers depositing the Dakota Formation sediments were submerged by the northward expansion of the Western Interior Seaway. This body of water deposited shale and chalk. Plesiosaurs lived in this sea and left behind fossils in several regions of Iowa. Northwestern Iowa's quartzite rocks may have attracted long-necked elasmosaurs as a source of gastroliths. Outside of Iowa the same deposits have preserved animals like mosasaurs and pterosaurs. During the mid-Campanian, about 75 million years ago, an asteroid roughly 1.5 miles in diameter struck the earth from the southeast near the east coast of the Western Interior Seaway. The impact site is located near the modern site of a town called Manson on the western half of the state. This event would have had a catastrophic impact on life on both land and sea for hundreds of miles around the crater, which had a diameter of roughly 22 miles. It scattered rock debris all the way to South Dakota and triggered huge tsunamis. However, despite the devastation South Dakotan fossils revealed that life recovered from the Iowan impact until the Cretaceous-Paleogene extinction event, itself likely caused by an extraterrestrial impact down in the Yucatan Peninsula of Mexico.

During the early part of the Cenozoic era, sediments were being eroded away from Iowa rather than deposited. Late in the Cenozoic glaciers intruded southward into Iowa. As they melted they left behind new sedimentary deposits. At this time Iowa was home to mammoths and mastodons, whose remains were preserved in a wide variety of locations in the state. During the glaciations of the Ice Age over the past 2.5 million years the glaciers transported and deposited fossils eroded from Cretaceous sediments. Some of the Cretaceous fossils to be redeposited in this manner included plesiosaur bones, shark teeth, and two dinosaur bones. The dinosaur bones reworked by glacial activity are the best in the state.

== History ==
=== Indigenous interpretations ===
Nahurac were spirit animals that the Pawnees believed inhabited certain local hills or mounds. Geographical features were likely regarded as nahurac sites because of the bones of strange extinct wildlife preserved in their sediments. A jawbone of the fish Saurocephalus lanciformis was found in a cave near where the Missouri and Soldier rivers combine, however since this fish is known only from the Niobrara chalk in Kansas and western Nebraska it was likely brought to the cave by a Native American. The cave may have been used as a place to commune with nahurac by the Pawnee. Such long-distance transportation of fossils was not unusual for Native Americans.

=== Scientific research ===
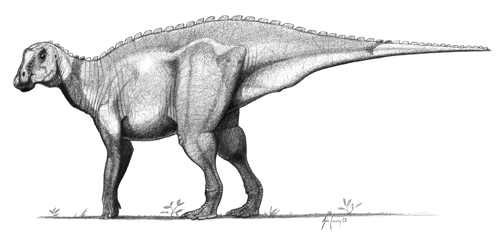
Hadrosaurid.

In August 1804, Meriwether Lewis of the Lewis and Clark Expedition noted the discovery of a fossil fish jawbone along the Missouri River in what is now Harrison County. This specimen was the first known fossil fish discovery in the Niobrara chalk. The specimen is also the only fossil collected by the Lewis and Clark Expedition that still exists. It is curated by the Academy of Natural Sciences in Philadelphia as ANSP 5516. In 1824, Dr. Richard T. Harlan would formally name the species that left the jaw Saurocephalus lanciformis, but mistook it for the remains of a marine reptile. Richard Harlan believed the jaw was from an "Enalio Saurian". This was imagined to be a marine lizard resembling plesiosaurs and ichthyosaurs. In 1830 Isaac Hays described a new species of fossil fish in New Jersey he named Saurodon leanus. The new find by Hays was similar enough to Saurocephalus that he was able to correct Harlan's misidentification. In 1856 Joseph Leidy had identified once more as a fish and dated it to the Cretaceous period.

In 1858 W. James Hall, the New York state geologist, made an early major discovery in the history of Iowa paleontology. He discovered crinoid fossils about a mile north of Le Grand. The local limestone preserved these fossils in unusually great detail. Later, during the 1890s, amateur fossil collector B. H. Bean began collecting in Iowa. Over time he became an expert on the state's middle Mississippian life.

In 1928, a femur was discovered in the Missouri River bluffs, not far from Decatur, Nebraska. Although it was impossible to identify the specimen as belonging to an individual species, the femur's anatomy was informative enough that paleontologists could identify it as belonging to an ornithopod about 32 feet long. This was the first scientifically documented dinosaur bone discovered in the Dakota Formation. In 1930 B. H. Bean made another big discovery when he obtained a limestone block that was being removed from a quarry. This single block preserved 183 individual starfish, which is significant because starfish fossils are very uncommon, even in the local area.

Later in the 1930s, a Materials Inspector working for the Iowa Highway Commission named John Holdefer noticed a fossil bone on a conveyor in a Plymouth County gravel pit, not far from Akron. He took the four inch long, partially weathered specimen home where it was kept on a shelf and sometimes used as a doorstop. Its scientific value went unrecognized for years.

In 1982, Brian J. Witzke discovered a piece of fossil bone in Guthrie County. The specimen had been entombed by a Dakota Formation river gravel deposit. Examination under a microscope revealed that the bone was dense with blood vessels in life, a characteristic of dinosaur bone. This was the first confirmed dinosaur fossil in the state.

After Gillette's dinosaur vertebra discovery, Doris Michaelson, daughter of John Holdefer, read a newspaper article on Iowa's dinosaur fossil. Suspecting the fossil formerly used as a doorstop may be significant, she took the bone to the Geological Survey Bureau to see if it could be identified. The Geological Survey affirmed it to be a dinosaur vertebra, likely from a hadrosaur.

On September 7, 2000, The Des Moines Register reported the discovery of the state's first identifiable dinosaur fossil. The discovery was made by a resident of Dickinson County named Charlie Gillette. The darkly colored, three inch long fossil originated among landscaping gravel from a nearby pit. He showed the specimen to his uncle, Jack Neuzil. Neuzil was a retired teacher and was interested in dinosaurs. He thought the bone might be a dinosaur vertebra. His suspicions were later confirmed by a professional paleontologist.

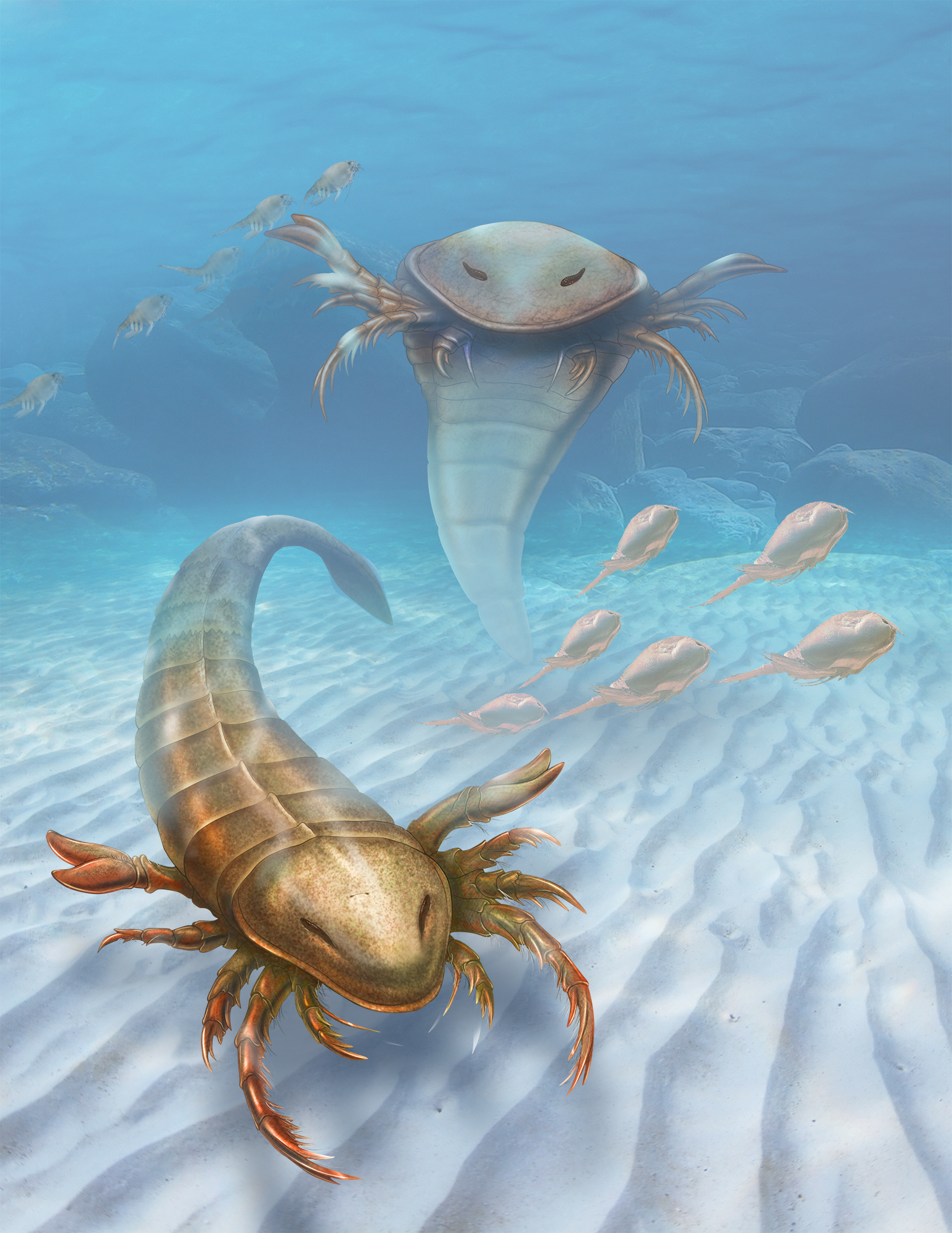
Pentecopterus is a Eurypterid that patrolled the early Ordovician waters of what is now Decorah

In 2015, paleontologists discovered the remains of a giant Megalograptid eurypterid in the middle Ordovician Winneshiek lagerstätte near the town of Decorah. It was named Pentecopterus decorahensis, named after the penteconter. The creature was one of the largest arthropods to have ever lived, with a max length of 5 feet, 7 inches (2 meters). The shale also contains the fossils of giant conodonts, Astraspis, giant algae, phyllocarids, and possibly the oldest known Thylacocephalan.

In 2017, Smilodon fossils were found in Iowa for the first time.

== Protected areas ==
- Rockford Iowa Fossil and Prairie Park
- Devonian Fossil Gorge at Coralville Lake

== People ==
- Edwin Harris Colbert was born in Clarinda on September 28, 1905.
- Carroll Lane Fenton was born in Butler County on 12 February, 1900.
- Mildred Adams Fenton was born in West Branch on 14 November, 1899.
- Remington Kellogg was born in Davenport on 5 October, 1892.
- John Campbell Merriam was born in Hopkinton on October 20, 1869.

== Natural history museums ==
- Battle Hill Museum of Natural History, Battle Creek (closed)
- Museum of Natural History, University of Iowa
- Putnam Museum, Davenport
- University Museum, University of Northern Iowa, Cedar Falls

== Notable clubs and associations ==
- The Mid-America Paleontological Association

== See also ==
- Paleontology in Illinois
- Paleontology in Minnesota
- Paleontology in Missouri
- Paleontology in Nebraska
- Paleontology in South Dakota
- Paleontology in Wisconsin
