= Geology of North Dakota =

Geology of US state

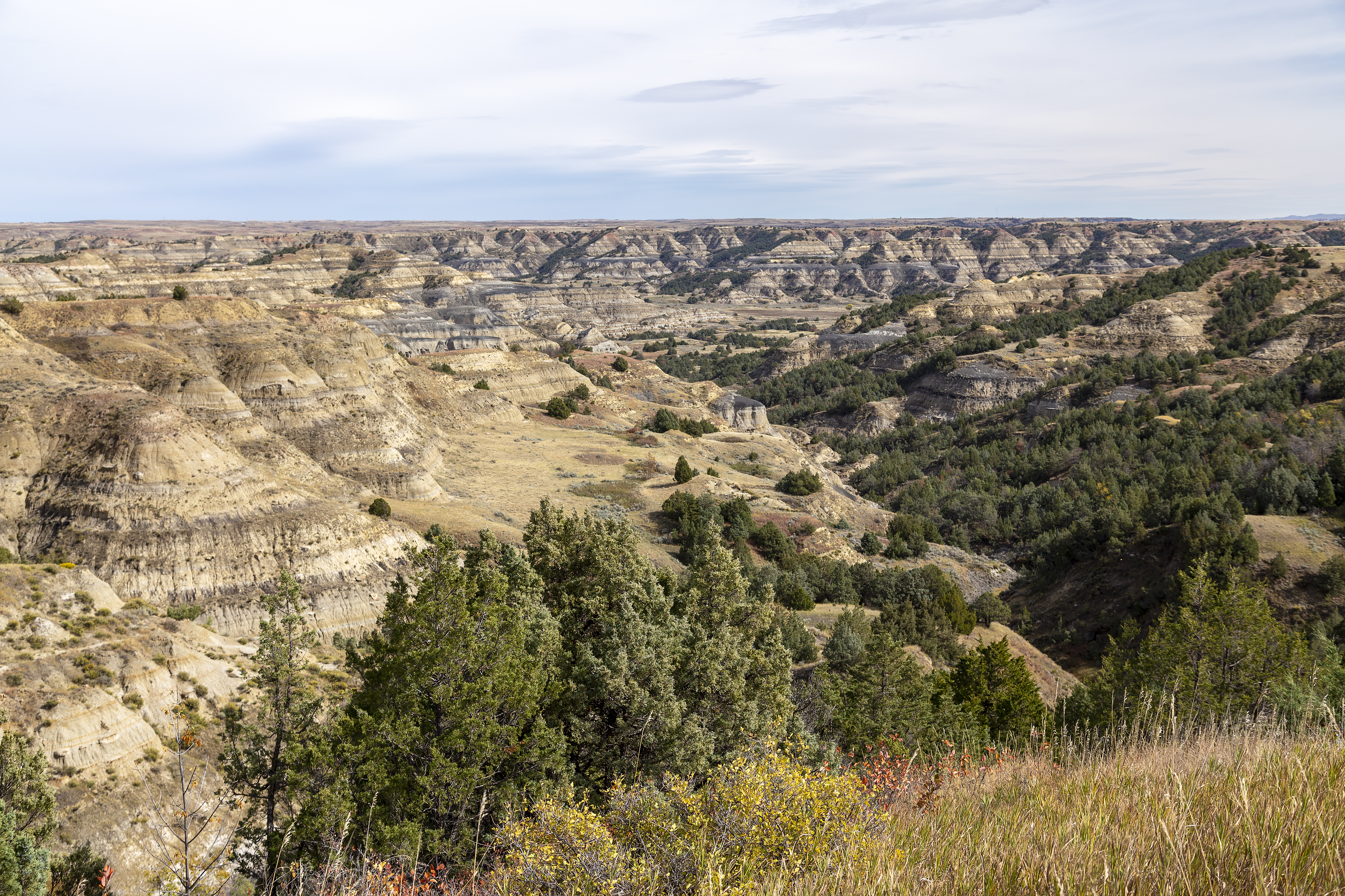
Oxbow overlook, Theodore Roosevelt National Park

The geology of North Dakota includes thick sequences of oil and coal bearing sedimentary rocks formed in shallow seas in the Paleozoic and Mesozoic, as well as terrestrial deposits from the Cenozoic on top of ancient Precambrian crystalline basement rocks. The state has extensive oil and gas, sand and gravel, coal, groundwater and other natural resources.

== Geologic history, stratigraphy and tectonics ==
North Dakota is underlain by Precambrian crystalline basement rock, although these rocks are less well understood than in neighboring states. Eastern North Dakota is mostly underlain by Archean gneisses, metasedimentary and metavolcanic rocks, and granitoids of the Superior Craton. In the Proterozoic, a mountain range known as the Western Dakota Mobile Belt formed between two billion and 1.8 billion years ago in connection with the Trans-Hudson orogeny, stretching north into Manitoba and Saskatchewan and south into South Dakota. It eroded almost entirely 1.5 billion years ago, shedding sediments now found in the Montana Belt Supergroup. The basement of western North Dakota bordering with Montana is interpreted to be a portion of the Wyoming Craton of Archean age. Commonly glacial erratic boulders are Precambrian rocks transported to the region by ice sheets.

=== Paleozoic (541–251 million years ago) ===
In the Cambrian at the beginning of the Paleozoic, North Dakota was located at the equator. Extensive deposition of sedimentary rocks began 515 million years ago, when the Canadian Shield and North Dakota flooded during a marine transgression forming the Sauk sequence. The sequence contains only one major unit—the Deadwood Formation. The area of the Nesson Anticline and some hills eroded out of the rugged Precambrian landscape likely remained above the water surface. The sequence begins with sandstone eroded from Precambrian rocks and ascends through limestone and shale, before returning to sandstone when sea levels dropped again. Conodont fossils are common in the Deadwood Formation.

During a dryland period, for 15 to 20 million years the land surface was eroded and no rocks from 485 to 470 million years ago are found in the rock record. A renewed marine transgression began the Tippecanoe sequence, including Winnipeg Group sandstone and shale, overlain by Red River Formation, Stony Mountain, Stonewall and Interlake Formation carbonates. In total, the Tippecanoe Sequence is 2000 feet thick.

During the Silurian, the Williston Basin subsided becoming a defined feature. Percolating groundwater eroded limestone into caves and hollows typical of a karst topography during a mid-Paleozoic dry period, before a return to a shallow sea in the Ordovician.

The region was above sea level for 40 million years during the Devonian as streams eroded the land surface until sea levels rose 356 million years ago. A weathered paleosol (known as the Ashern Formation) at the top of the Interlake Formation indicates that the Devonian and Mississippian Kaskaskia Sequence eroded the carbonates of the Interlake Formation. Winnipegosis Formation limestone and dolomite formed on top of the Ashern Formation, ascending to sandstone and shale in the Souris River and Dawson Bay formations. Periodically, the area dried out, resulting in weathered paleosols and the red and green siltstone layers of the Three Forks Formation which cover the Birdbear Formation carbonates. The collision of North America and Europe as Pangea began to form kicked off the Caledonian orogeny and realigned the Williston Basin opening to the sea in the west rather than the north.

During the maximum extent of the sea, the Lodgepole and Mission Canyon formations took shape. A dry period precipitated Charles Formation evaporites, followed by Big Snowy Group carbonates, sand and shale. The ancestral Rocky Mountains began to rise around this time, bringing the Otter Formation shales and then draining the sea and uplifting the land.

After a 10 million year dry period, shallow water crept back in during the Pennsylvanian beginning the Absaroka Sequence with Tyler Formation sandstone and shale, overlain by carbonates and brown clastic rocks in the Amsden Formation and Broom Creek Formation sandy carbonates. Another 10 million years of erosion is marked by an unconformity. Through the Permian, salt and red bed formations filled the Williston Basin belonging to the Opeche and Spearfish formations, along with the Minnekahta Formation limestone.

=== Mesozoic (251–66 million years ago) ===
In the Triassic, at the beginning of the Mesozoic, a meteorite struck in what is now McKenzie County, rearranging older sediments and creating the Red Wing crater. Some salt and gypsum remains from the time period, indicative of the vast deserts that covered Pangea at the time. An unconformity wipes out 45 million years of the early Jurassic before the beginning of the Zuni Sequence. North Dakota was a low forested landscape experiencing ongoing erosion. Rivers and streams moving across the eroded Jurassic landscape deposited the sandstone and siltstone Inyan Kara Formation. Thick layers of shale, such as the Pierre Formation, formed in the Western Interior Seaway during a major global marine transgression in the Cretaceous.

=== Cenozoic (66 million years ago–present) ===
In the early Cenozoic, uplift and erosion of the Rocky Mountains with the continuation of the Laramide orogeny dumped sediment into the Williston Basin, creating the sandstone and shale of the Ludlow Formation, Cannonball Formation and Slope Formation together with a final marine transgression into North Dakota from 65 to 55 million years ago. The Bullion Creek Formation and the Sentinel Butte Formation covered over these units with lignite coal. They outcrop in the west and contain most of the state's coal reserves (although the single most productive unit is the Sentinel Butte Formation). Coal formation took place in a coastal swamp environment akin to large coastal marshes that exist currently in the Holocene along the US Atlantic coast. Even as Bullion Creek sediments were being deposited in the center of the state, swamps to the west were filling and covering them over with Sentinel Butte material.

From 50 to 60 million years ago in the Paleocene and Eocene the clay and sand units of the Golden Valley Formation deposited in lakes and streams and lie above Sentinel Butte units in some locations in the west. During the Eocene, mammals and grasses diversified in the area as North Dakota transitioned from a warm temperate to subtropical climate. With long running dryland conditions, North Dakota has gone through a period of extensive weathering that continues in the modern period, often producing unconsolidated sediments rather than rocks. The Tejas Sequence began to form in the Oligocene, starting off with conglomerate, siltstone, clay, volcanic ash, freshwater limestone and sands of the White River Group. Widespread volcanism to the west deposited volcanic ash in Miocene and Pliocene lake beds, which now forms the peaks of the Killdeer Mountains.

From around 35 million years ago, large quantities of gravel and sand from the Absaroka Mountains, Big Horn Mountains and Black Hills deposited in western North Dakota and up to 400 feet of limestone plated the bottom of a lake that remains as the Killdeer Mountains. Estimates suggest several thousand cubic miles of sediment were eroded from five million years ago until three million years ago. Evidence of the erosion is found in the Turtle Mountains, which were originally part of a continuous plateau before up to 600 feet of sandstone and shale eroded between the two features prior to glaciation.

Pliocene erosion created the Red River Valley, as a tributary of the Cheyenne River eroded a gently sloping escarpment 1000 feet down (the ground surface of the valley is higher, due to glacial and lake bed sediments). The Killdeer Mountains are up to 1300 feet above the Little Missouri River, leading to inferences about the previous height of the plain.

The state was glaciated six to seven times during the Pleistocene, contributing to erosion and rechanneling rivers. During the last 11,000 years of the Holocene, an initial warm period led to widespread sagebrush grasslands around 7000 years ago with large dunes formed at Wyndmere, Walhalla and Denbigh. This gave way to a wetter period with more widespread forests. Devils Lake and Stump Lake have periodically dried up or fluctuated in response to climate changes. In the 1800s, when European settlers arrived in large numbers, Stump Lake contained the stumps of trees that had grown on dryland in the 1300s.

== Hydrogeology ==
The water table in North Dakota ranges between 15 and 50 feet deep, or 100 feet in upland areas. Fully wet areas are recognized in drill cores by unoxidized dark material. The lignite and sandstone of the Fort Union Group in the west is the top groundwater unit and a common source of water for farms and ranches. The western two-thirds of the state is underlain by an extensive sandstone aquifer, mainly in the Fox Hills Formation and the lower Hell Creek Formation. Although it is close to the surface in the east, it slopes to up to 2000 feet below the ground surface in south-central North Dakota. Below this unit is fine-grained Cretaceous shale and sandstone that produce almost no water. The underlying Kara Formation limestones are beneath almost the entire state. Known as the Dakota aquifer, it is commonly tapped for artesian wells.

Very few wells were drilled in the aquifer before 1900, although one at Elledale in 1886 went down 1087 feet and produced up to 700 gallons a minute with a pressure reaching 176 pounds per square inch. Widespread drilling in the 1910s prompted state requirements for pressure control valves due to a drop in pressure and the drying up of many wells. The water has high salinity but tends to be warm and is preferred in parts of the state for watering cattle in the winter. It is frequently used for oil-field operations and waste brine is injected back into the aquifer. Thick Jurassic and Triassic separates the Dakota aquifer from the deepest Paleozoic limestone aquifer underlying most of the state.

== Natural resource geology ==
The Williston Basin produces most of North Dakota's oil and gas, particularly since the boom in hydraulic fracturing after 2006. The Bakken Formation is particularly productive and underlies all but the southwest corner of the basin.

Bowman County in the southwest has structurally controlled fields in Ordovician formations. Between the north of the Little Missouri River and the Burke County line is the Nesson Anticline, one of the largest geologic features in the state. Limestone to the northeast and east of the anticline in Bottineau, Burke and Renville counties, oil and gas is trapped by anhydrite infilling or shale and siltstone cap rock in the Triassic Spearfish Formation, over an unconformity.

The beach and nearshore sediments of the Tyler Formation, close to Dickinson, North Dakota also house oil, trapped in Mississippian and Pennsylvanian sediments together with a shoreline stream filled with oil-bearing sand, south of Dickinson at Rocky Ridge. In one unusual case, the oil-bearing Red Wing Structure in McKenzie County contains Mississippian strata uplifted 3000 feet higher than neighboring sediments of the same age due to a meteorite impact.

Western North Dakota is notable for widespread clinker—clay, shale and sandstone baked into a material like natural brick by burning coal . Some beds are up to 50 feet thick in the state. Prairie fires periodically light lignite on fire, including one fire that burned near Medora from 1951 until 1977, or over at 30 locations over a 7000-acre area close to Amidon. It is widely used as a road material and as ornamentation for gardens.

Iron oxide, calcium carbonate and silica concretions frequently form nodules and concretions in the west, including siderite ironstone and petrified logs. Two-thirds of the west of the state are underlain by lignite, which was mined for fuel by Native Americans and by American explorers, Lewis and Clark. Before 1902, mining was done by hand limited by more than 10 feet of overburden. However, the introduction of heavy equipment increased mining efforts. In areas, old mine shafts have collapsed, pitting the overlying landscape. After peaking at 320 mines in 1940 after 21 years of heavy machinery mining, the number of mines began to drop. The number of mines dropped to 100 in 1950 and only 38 by 1965. During the 1970s, new large power plants opened adjacent to Lake Sakakawea and together with a gasification project at North American Coal Company's Beulah plant, helped to drive new demand.

Weathering and oxidation of lignite produces leonardite which is used as a dispersant and a control on viscosity for oil wells. Peat, concentrated in areas like the Souris River in McHenry County is used in gardens, but not widely produced, and the state has up to 100,000 tons of reserves.

Fine sand is common, suitable for foundries as well as mortar and plaster. Both sand and gravel are most common in the formerly glaciated parts of the state northeast of the Missouri River where beach deposits formed after the ice sheets melted. Shale is common in the western Red River Valley and appears frequently in glacial till. Point bars in rivers and glacial kame deposits are also important sources of sand and gravel. Large outwash plains are found in Nelson, Eddy, Benson, Logan, Ransom and Sheridan counties.

In 1955, ore grade uranium was found in lignite between Belfield and Amidon in southeast Billings County. Uranium dissolved from enriched ash and percolated upward into the coal. Only a few hundred tons were ever extracted and ended in 1967 due to difficulty milling lignite compared with sandstone deposits in the Colorado Plateau. North Dakota has up to 1700 cubic miles of halite salt deposits below ground discovered during oil drilling.

Gold, volcanic ash, quartzite, clay and sulfur are also resources.
