= Geology of Missouri =

The geology of Missouri includes deep Precambrian basement rocks formed within the last two billion years and overlain by thick sequences of marine sedimentary rocks, interspersed with igneous rocks by periods of volcanic activity. Missouri is a leading producer of lead from minerals formed in Paleozoic dolomite.

== Geologic history, stratigraphy and tectonics ==
The oldest rocks in Missouri are igneous and metamorphic crystalline basement rocks formed during the Proterozoic through the accretion of volcanic island arcs to the southern shore of the proto-North American continent of Laurentia. Rocks formed from 1.7 to 1.6 billion years ago are primarily known from deep boreholes in the north of the state, but are universally deeply buried by thick layers of sedimentary rock. Younger igneous rocks formed from magma in the south between 1.5 and 1.4 billion years ago. In places, magma intruded preexisting basement rock and then erupted at the surface as volcanoes along the Laurentian coastline. Granite and lava flows remain in the St. Francois Mountains from this period. Middle Proterozoic basement rocks are cut by the Central Missouri Tectonic Zone and Grand River fault zone, both of which are hypothesized to be the remnants of boundaries between small plates. Magma often moves along these fault zones.

Between the two zones is the Missouri Gravity Low, or MGL, a mass of low density granite including the Missouri batholith up to 370 miles long and 60 miles wide, identified in gravity surveys. Igneous activity ended around 1.3 billion years ago, with the intrusion of numerous dikes and sills into newly crystallized rhyolite and granite.

Although not directly impacting the current boundaries of Missouri, the Midcontinent Rift System formed from 1.2 to one billion years ago as mafic lava erupted in a rift zone spanning Lake Superior through Iowa to Kansas. Laurentia was included in the supercontinent Rodinia from one billion to 539 million years ago and no new rock formation took place in Missouri. Failed rifting of the continent produced the Reelfoot Rift, which extends beneath the Mississippi Embayment to the southeast lowlands of the state and intersects the Missouri Gravity Low, creating the New Madrid Seismic Zone.

=== Paleozoic (539–251 million years ago) ===
Sloss sequences – long-running changes in sea level, described by American geologist Laurence L. Sloss – played an important role in sediment deposition during the Paleozoic. The Sauk sequence formed during the Cambrian, followed by the Tippecanoe in the Ordovician, the Kaskaskia between the full immersion of the Silurian and the early Mississippian. Finally, the Absaroka sequence emplaced into the early Pennsylvanian.

The Great Unconformity separates Proterozoic igneous rocks from the Lamotte Sandstone, the basal unit of the Sauk sequence which also includes the Bonneterre Dolomite, Davis Formation, Derby-Roe Run Dolomite, Potosi Dolomite and Eminence Dolomite from the Cambrian, and the Ordovician Gasconade Dolomite, Roubidoux Formation and Jefferson City Dolomite. The Tippecanoe comprises the St. Peter Sandstone, Joachim Dolomite, Plattin Limestone, Decorah Shale, Kimmswick Limestone, and an unconformity, followed by the Girardeau Limestone (only in the southeast), Maquoketa Shale and northeast Missouri Noix Limestone. Silurian Tippecanoe rocks include only two units: the Bainbridge Formation in the southeast and Bowling Green Dolomite in the northeast.

Devonian Kaskaskia rocks include the Chattanooga Shale in the southwest, Cedar Valley Limestone, split by an unconformity and separated from Mississippian rocks by a second unconformity, with numerous small shale and limestone units in the east. A complicated sequence of shale, sandstone and limestone follows from the Carboniferous.

Sedimentary petrologists have debated why dolomite is so prevalent in Missouri relative to limestone, even though marine conditions often favor limestone formation. Only a few dolomite beds formed after the Middle Ordovician and few are younger than the Joachim Dolomite. Fault fractures suggest that groundwater altered limestone to dolomite, replacing calcium with magnesium.

=== Mesozoic (251–66 million years ago) ===
The Zuñi sequence formed in the Mesozoic, during a fifth major marine transgression lasting from the Middle Jurassic into the Cretaceous. The Cretaceous geochronology of the state is unclear and debated, between some who believe the state experienced dryland conditions and others who suspect it was flooded. The only Cretaceous deposits are unconsolidated marine and delta sands together with clay in the Southeast Lowlands, beneath Pleistocene alluvium. Previously, small circular deposits of Cretaceous clay in the Ozarks were suspected to be the remains of sinkholes in Ordovician dolomite. However, recent fossil discoveries suggest possible small lakes and ponds.

=== Cenozoic (66 million years ago – present) ===
A final marine transgression called the Tejas sequence took place in the Cenozoic. Aside from clay and both delta and marine sandstone in the Crowley Ridge, deposited in the subsiding Mississippi Embayment, there are no Paleogene rocks in the state. The Midway Group deposited in the Paleocene, rich in bentonite, followed by the Eocene Wilcox Group, which contains terrestrial sandstone and clay laden with plant fossils.

In unglaciated parts of the state and beneath Quaternary deposits in the north is the Pliocene Mounds Gravel, unconformably atop older rocks and sediments. The Mounds Gravel remains as gravel alluvium from the Teays River, which once flowed north of current day St. Louis transporting sediments shed by the rising Rocky Mountains. Some geologists have suggested that the Mounds Gravel originated from erosion of the Central Highlands, when a large river flowed south through Kansas and Oklahoma to the Gulf of Mexico, until it was rechanneled to the present Mississippi River during the Illinoian glaciation. As Missouri experienced terrestrial erosion in the Pliocene, the Ozark Dome uplifted.

Missouri did experience the Pleistocene glaciations, with the most recent glacial till from 600,000 years ago. A small lobe of ice pushed across the Mississippi River in the vicinity of St. Louis 200,000 years ago. The route of the Ancestral Kansas River rapidly eroded and filled with sediment in the area of Kansas City during periods of glacial melting and outwash. Till in northern Missouri is up to several hundred feet thick, sometimes containing cobbles and boulders, with an overall tan to red-brown color.

== 38th Parallel Lineament ==
The Thirty-Eight Parallel Lineament is one of Missouri's unique structural features, a 10- to 20-mile wide area of folds, faults and shattered bedrock from the Kansas state line to Vernon County to the Mississippi River in Ste. Genevieve County. It contains the widespread Ste. Genevieve Fault and pockets of Paleozoic rock—particularly eight locations with broken, but rearranged groupings of igneous and sedimentary rocks together. Hypotheses suggest possible origins ranging from cryovolcanoes to pent up gas tearing through Paleozoic rocks and bringing up more ancient igneous rocks.

== Natural resource geology ==
Galena is the official state mineral of Missouri and lead mining began in the 1720s in Madison County, spearheaded by French miners. The state is the leading extractor of lead in the U.S., both from galena and sphalerite. The minerals are sourced from Mississippi Valley Type deposits, deposited through hydrothermal activity. The Old Lead Belt and Tri-State Area were mined significantly before World War II, with new deposits found since in the southeast. The new deposit is known as the Viburnum Trend and spans Iron County and Reynolds County, with secondary production of copper, cadmium and silver, housed in the Bonneterre Dolomite between 600 and 1500 feet deep. During the late Cambrian, stromatalite beds shielded carbonates forming below and created a permeable interface for mineralization.
