= Killdeer Formation =

- Stratigraphic range: Cretaceous
- Type: Formation

Location
- Region: North Dakota
- Country: United States

The Killdeer Formation is a geologic formation in North Dakota. It preserves fossils dating back to the Neogene.

== See also ==
- List of fossiliferous stratigraphic units in North Dakota
- Paleontology in North Dakota
