= Sauk sequence =

Cratonic sequence in North America

The Sauk sequence was the earliest of the six cratonic sequences that have occurred during the Phanerozoic in North America. It was followed by the Tippecanoe, Kaskaskia, Absaroka, Zuñi, and Tejas sequences.

The sequence dates from the late Proterozoic through the early Ordovician periods, though the marine transgression did not begin in earnest until the middle Cambrian. It is one of the most striking cratonic sequences in the geological record, spreading sheets of sandstone across basement rock deep into the interiors of many continents. The transgression took place rapidly, advancing over 300 kilometers (190 mi) across the Grand Canyon region in less than five million years.

At its peak, most of North America was covered by the shallow Sauk Sea, save for parts of the Canadian Shield and the islands of the Transcontinental Arch. The stratigraphy of the Sauk sequence indicates shallow-water deposition, primarily consisting of well-sorted sandstones and clastic carbonates. A marine regression ended the Sauk sequence early in the Ordovician, to be followed by the Tippecanoe sequence later in the period.

The transgression is attributed to thermal subsidence following the breakup of the supercontinent of Rodinia, combined with a rise in global sea level due to climate change or shifts in global tectonics.
