= List of fossiliferous stratigraphic units in North Dakota =

This article contains a list of fossil-bearing stratigraphic units in the state of North Dakota, U.S.

== Sites ==
Group or Formation	Period	Notes
Arikaree Formation	Paleogene	
Brule Formation	Paleogene	
Bullion Creek Formation	Paleogene	
Cannonball Formation	Paleogene	
Carlise Shale	Cretaceous	
Chadron Formation	Paleogene	
Colorado Group/Niobrara	Cretaceous	
Deadwood Formation	Ordovician	
Fox Hills Formation	Cretaceous	
Fort Union Formation	Paleogene, Cretaceous	
Fort Union Group/Sentinel Butte	Paleogene	
Golden Valley Formation	Paleogene	
Hell Creek Formation	Cretaceous	
Kildeer Formation	Neogene	
Lance Formation	Paleogene, Cretaceous	
Ludlow Formation	Paleogene	
Sentinel Butte Formation	Paleogene	
Slope Formation	Paleogene	
Stony Mountain Formation	Ordovician	
Tongue River Formation	Paleogene	
Winnipegosis Formation	Devonian	

== See also ==
- Paleontology in North Dakota
