= Transcontinental Arch =

The Transcontinental Arch refers to the islands of North America which extended from New Mexico to Minnesota and the Great Lakes region. These islands were present during the Sauk sequence, the earliest cratonic sequence. As a result of the Sauk sequence, epeiric seas covered most of North America, leaving only the craton of the Canadian Shield and the Transcontinental Arch islands exposed.

The Transcontinental Arch, as originally understood, was at its peak during the Pennsylvanian, around 323 to 299 million years ago. However, the arch may have been present as early as the late Proterozoic and experienced repeated rejuvenation throughout the Paleozoic (521 to 252 million years ago).
