= Tongue River Member =

Geologic member in the Fort Union Formation

- Stratigraphic range: Paleogene
- Mining the coal-rich Tongue River Member, Fort Union Formation (Wyodak coal mine, Powder River Basin, Wyoming)
- Type: Member
- Unit of: Fort Union Formation
- Overlies: Lebo Member

Location
- Region: North Dakota, Wyoming
- Country: United States

The Tongue River Member is the uppermost geologic member of the Fort Union Formation in Montana, North Dakota, Wyoming. The strata are yellow or light-colored massive sandstones and numerous thick coal beds.

The vertebrate fossil fauna includes fishes, turtles, crocodiles, and mammals. Mammalian genera known from rocks of both the Torrejonian and the Tiffanian land mammal ages (middle and late Paleocene) are present.

== See also ==
- List of fossiliferous stratigraphic units in North Dakota
- Paleontology in North Dakota
- Paleontology in Wyoming
