= Absaroka =

Absaroka may refer to:

== Places ==
- Absaroka (proposed state), parts of the states of Montana, South Dakota, and Wyoming, that contemplated secession and statehood in 1939
- Absaroka Range, a sub-range of the Rocky Mountains stretching across Montana and Wyoming in the northwestern United States

== Other uses ==
- Absaroke or Absaroka, a Native American people also known as the Crow
- Absaroka County, the fictional location of the Walt Longmire Mysteries series of novels by Craig Johnson (author) and its TV adaptation, Longmire
- Absaroka sequence, a cratonic sequence that extended from the end of the Mississippian through the Permian periods
- USS Absaroka (ID-2518), a steamer in the United States Navy

== See also ==
- Absaroka-Beartooth Wilderness
- North Absaroka Wilderness
