= Ludlow Formation =

Geologic formation in North Dakota, United States

- Stratigraphic range: Paleogene
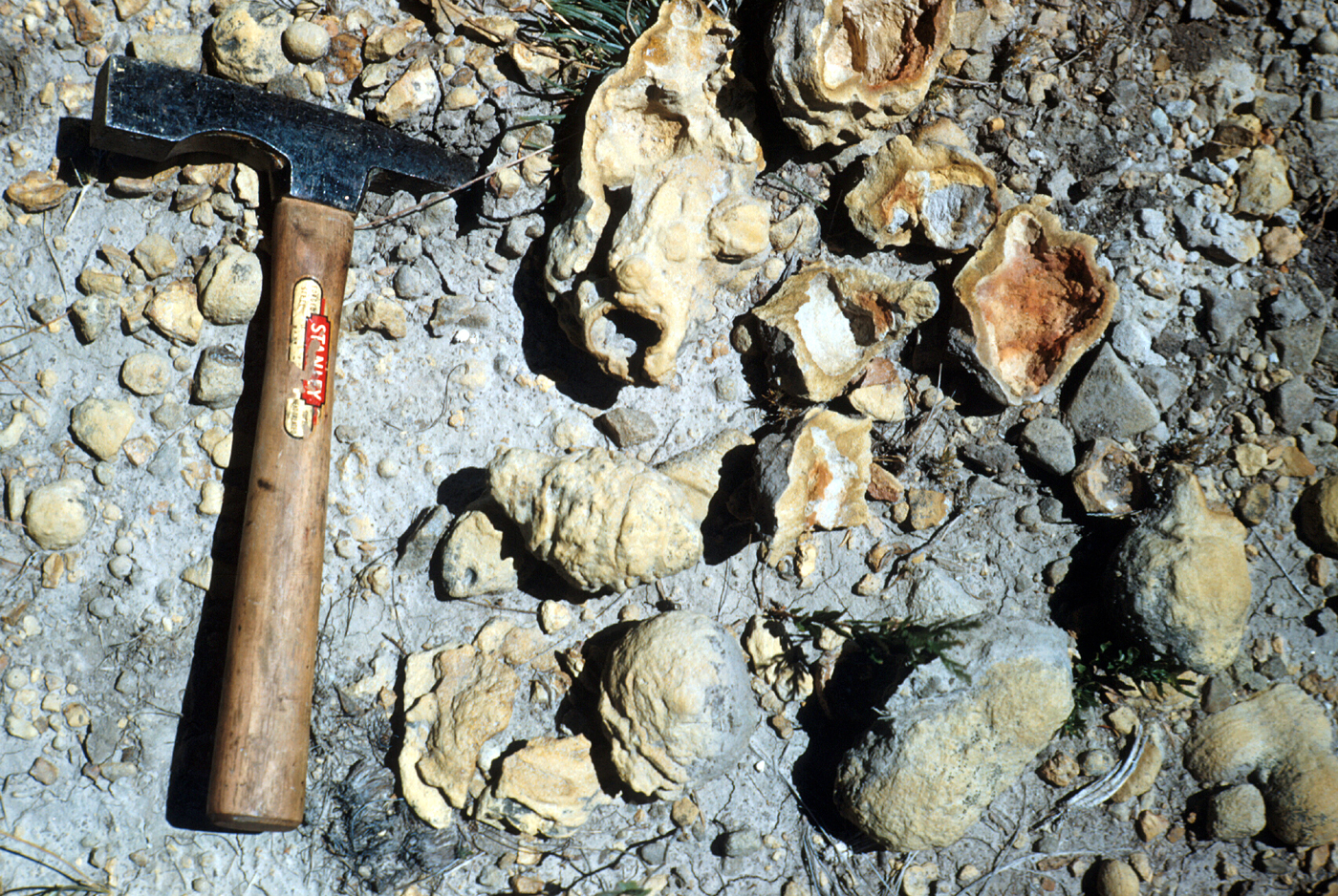
- Jarosite concretions from the Ludlow Formation (South Dakota)
- Type: Formation
- Unit of: (partially) Fort Union Formation
- Underlies: Cannonball Formation and Slope Formation
- Overlies: Hell Creek Formation

Location
- Region: North Dakota, South Dakota
- Country: United States

The Ludlow Formation is a geologic formation in western North Dakota. It preserves fossils dating back to the Paleogene Period.

== See also ==
- List of fossiliferous stratigraphic units in North Dakota
- Paleontology in North Dakota
