= Slope Formation =

Geologic formation

- Stratigraphic range: Paleogene
- Type: Formation
- Underlies: Bullion Creek Formation
- Overlies: Ludlow Formation, Cannonball Formation

Location
- Region: North Dakota
- Country: United States

The Slope Formation is a geologic formation in western North Dakota. It preserves fossils dating back to the Paleogene Period.

== See also ==
- List of fossiliferous stratigraphic units in North Dakota
- Paleontology in North Dakota
