= Cannonball Formation =

Geologic formation in North Dakota, US

- Stratigraphic range: Paleogene
- Type: Formation
- Underlies: Bullion Creek Formation, Slope Formation
- Overlies: Hell Creek Formation, Ludlow Formation

Location
- Region: North Dakota
- Country: United States

The Cannonball Formation is a geologic formation in western North Dakota. It preserves fossils dating back to the Paleogene Period.

== See also ==
- List of fossiliferous stratigraphic units in North Dakota
- Paleontology in North Dakota
