= Paleontology in Minnesota =

Paleontological research in the U.S. state of Minnesota

The location of the state of Minnesota

Paleontology in Minnesota refers to paleontological research occurring within or conducted by people from the U.S. state of Minnesota. The geologic record of Minnesota spans from Precambrian to recent with the exceptions of major gaps including the Silurian period, the interval from the Middle to Upper Devonian to the Cretaceous, and the Cenozoic. During the Precambrian, Minnesota was covered by an ocean where local bacteria ended up forming banded iron formations and stromatolites. During the early part of the Paleozoic era southern Minnesota was covered by a shallow tropical sea that would come to be home to creatures like brachiopods, bryozoans, massive cephalopods, corals, crinoids, graptolites, and trilobites. The sea withdrew from the state during the Silurian, but returned during the Devonian. However, the rest of the Paleozoic is missing from the local rock record. The Triassic is also missing from the local rock record and Jurassic deposits, while present, lack fossils. Another sea entered the state during the Cretaceous period, this one inhabited by creatures like ammonites and sawfish. Duckbilled dinosaurs roamed the land. The Paleogene and Neogene periods of the ensuing Cenozoic era are also missing from the local rock record, but during the Ice Age evidence points to glacial activity in the state. Woolly mammoths, mastodons, and musk oxen inhabited Minnesota at the time. Local Native Americans interpreted such remains as the bones of the water monster Unktehi. They also told myths about thunder birds that may have been based on Ice Age bird fossils. By the early 19th century, the state's fossil had already attracted the attention of formally trained scientists. Early research included the Cretaceous plant discoveries made by Leo Lesquereux.

== Prehistory ==
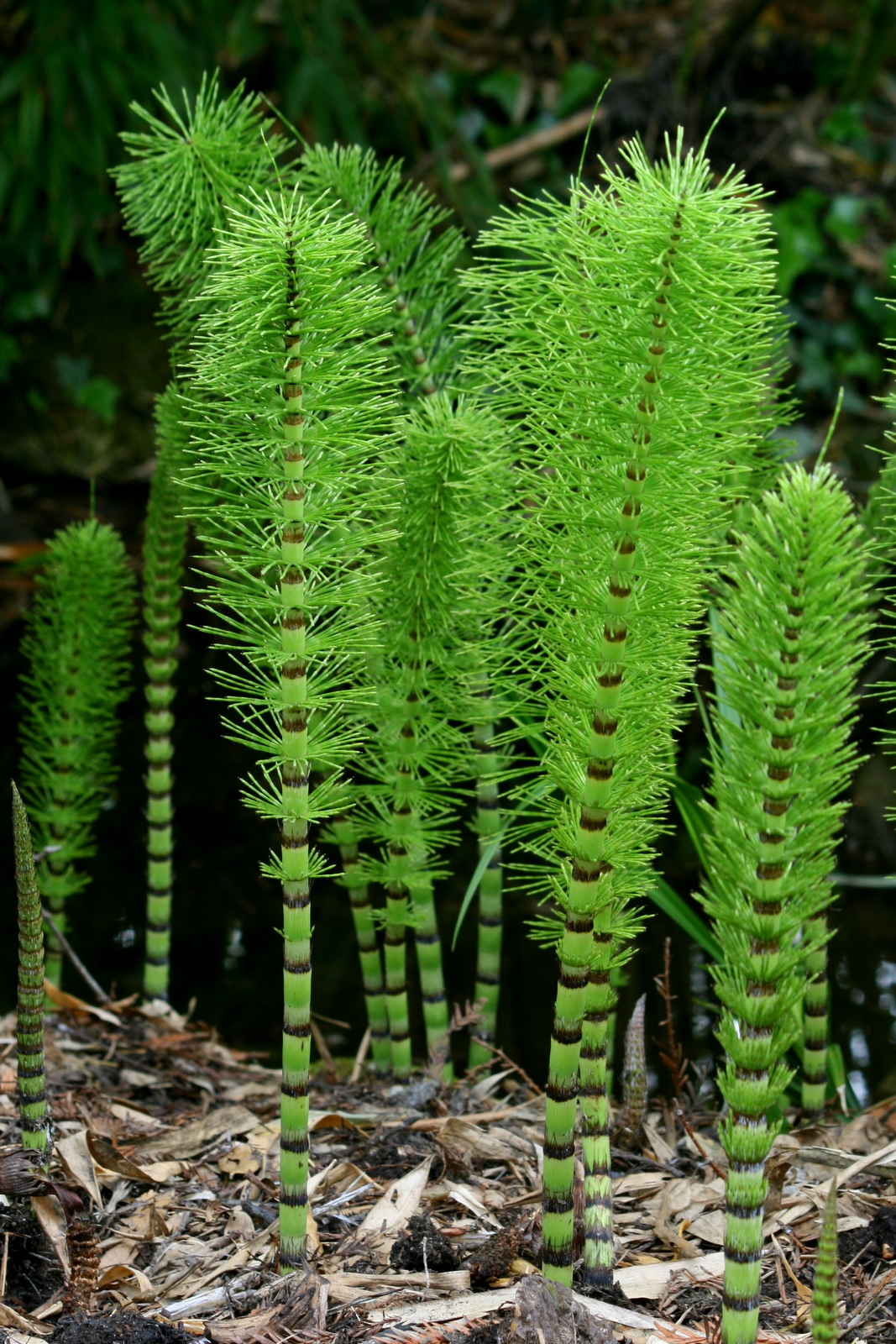
Equisetum.

During the Precambrian, Minnesota was covered by an ocean. Contemporary local bacteria ended up forming banded iron formations and stromatolites. During the early part of the Paleozoic era, Minnesota had a tropical climate because it was located near the equator. The southern half of the state was covered by a shallow sea. Late Cambrian life in Minnesota included brachiopods, cystoids, graptolites, pteropods, a variety of trilobites, and worms. Worms living in Late Cambrian Minnesota left behind trace fossils of the trails they made through the sediment.

Ordovician Minnesota still hosted this sea, although there may have been times during this period when it expanded to submerge the entire state. The most common fossils from the Early Ordovician of Minnesota are the remains of ancient microbial mats and stromatolites. Early Ordovician life of Minnesota included cephalopods, gastropods, and trilobites. The state's Early Ordovician cephalopods could achieve lengths between 5 and 15 feet (1.5 and 4.6 m) long. Fossils of such large cephalopods were preserved in the vicinity of Cherokee Park in West Side, St. Paul. Other animals that inhabited Minnesota during the Ordovician included brachiopods, bryozoans, corals, crinoids, graptolites, and trilobites. Ordovician marine plants also fossilized in the state. Later in the period brachiopods, bryozoans, crinoids, and molluscs predominated.

The sea withdrew from Minnesota for the duration of the ensuing Silurian period. At this time local sediments were eroded away rather than deposited, so there are no rocks in which contemporary local wildlife could have been fossilized. During the ensuing Devonian period, the sea returned to southern Minnesota and local sediment deposition resumed. Brachiopods, cephalopods, corals, and trilobites lived there. Late Devonian life of Minnesota also included brachiopods and corals. Their remains were preserved in Fillmore, Freeborn, and Mower Counties. Fishes were present but none of the local fossils are complete, and only fragments remain to testify of their presence. This is where the local Paleozoic fossil record ends, as Minnesota has no Carboniferous or Permian rocks wherein fossil of those ages could have been preserved.

The gap in the fossil record that began in the late Paleozoic spans the entire Triassic period of the ensuing Mesozoic era. However, during the ensuing Jurassic a sea once more intruded into the state. No fossils are known from sediments deposited by this sea. Minnesota played host to the northeastern corner of yet another sea during the ensuing Cretaceous period. Ammonites, clams, and oysters lived here. Ammonites and oysters were preserved in the Coleraine area. Contemporary gastropods and pelecypods left behind abundant fossils in what is now the Mesabi Range. Fish teeth and bones were preserved in Big Stone County. Sawfish lived in the state during the Cretaceous. Pholidosaurid remains, belonging to Terminonaris, have been unearthed in Minnesota.

On land, the local vegetation flourished under a hot climate. Minnesota's Cretaceous flora is known to have included more than two hundred kinds of plants. 175 of these were dicotyledons. The state's Cretaceous flora included six species of cycads, Equisetum, evergreens, six species of ferns, laurels, pomegranates, poplars, tulip trees, giant redwoods, and willows. Scant dinosaur fossils have been discovered in Minnesota such as the claw of a dromaeosaur, and hadrosaur bones preserved in the Dakota Formation. Much of Minnesota's dinosaur fossils are the bones and teeth left behind by bloated dinosaur carcasses drifting out into the Western Interior Seaway. Invertebrate fossils have been unearthed in Minnesota.

Following the Mesozoic, a gap in the rock record spans the entire Cenozoic era except for the Quaternary. At points during the Wisconsin glaciation of the Pleistocene, Minnesota was covered by glaciers. Pleistocene plant fossils include logs, branches, leaves, and mosses. Among the Pleistocene fauna of Minnesota were badgers, beavers, bison, elk, woolly mammoths, mastodons, musk oxen, rabbits, reindeer, rodents, and skunks. Bison fossils are very common and were even preserved in sizable bonebeds in places like at Riverton's Sagamore Iron Mine and another in Itasca State Park. Elk remains are relatively common.

== History ==
=== Indigenous interpretations ===
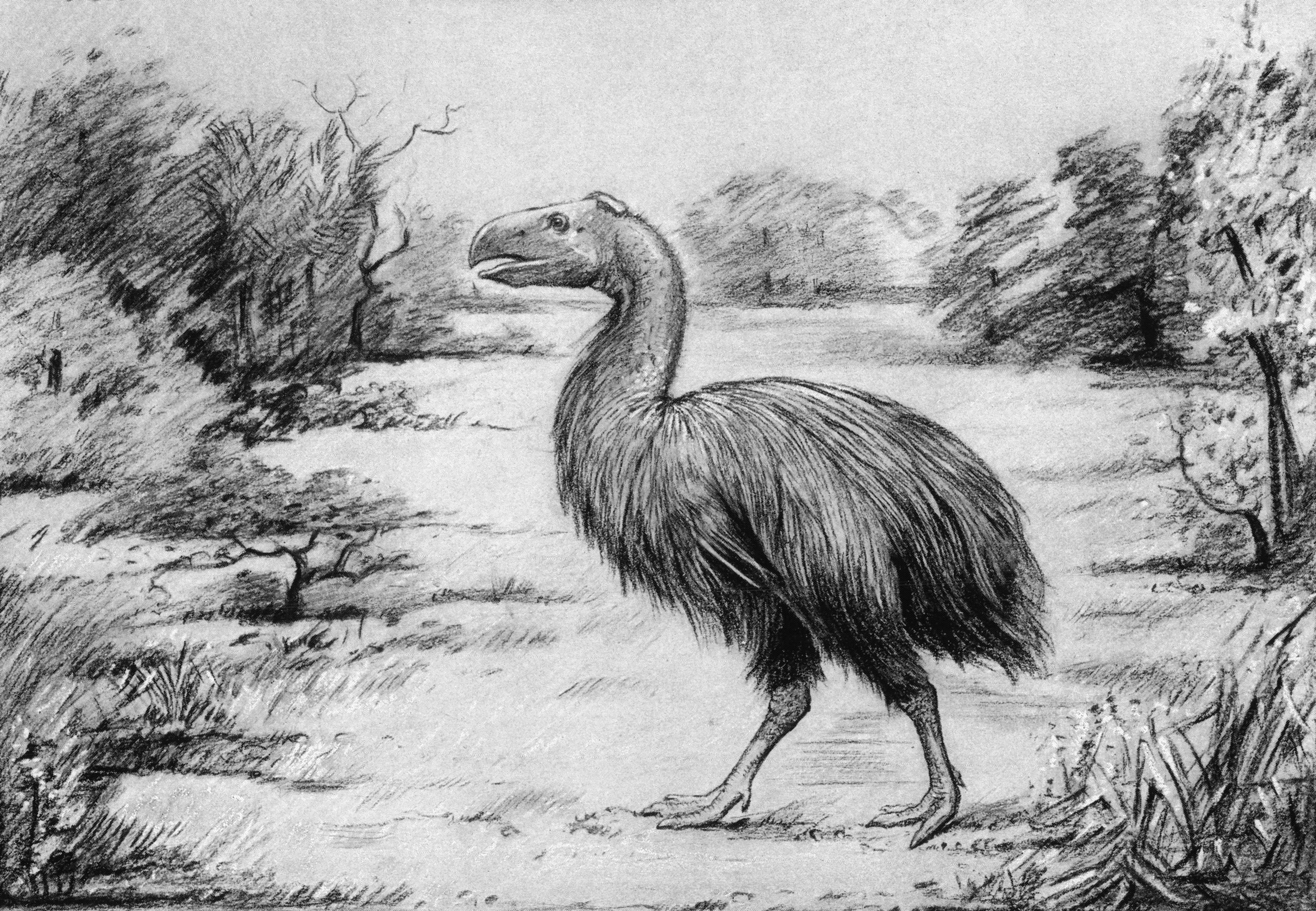
Gastornis.

The Dakota Sioux of Minnesota believed in a water monster called Unktehi, which was thought to resemble a giant buffalo. They attributed mammoth remains to Unktehi since no land animal had such large bones and the remains were typically found in wet areas of low elevation, thus establishing a connection to water. Similar lines of reasoning are seen in other myths based on fossil proboscidean finds throughout North America.

Medicine men would also chew on bones attributed to Unktehi as part of their initiation. They also used to add pieces of mastodon bones to their medicine bags. These relics were highly treasured and were treated with a reverence comparable to that shown by Catholics to relics of saints. The mastodon bones were thought to have powerful supernatural potency.

The Dakota Sioux of Minnesota also believed in the Wakinyan, gigantic thunderbirds thought to be the mortal enemy of Unktehi and the water monsters. Local discoveries of fossils left by large Ice Age bird remains like giant condors, and teratorns may have inspired myths about the Wakinyan thunder birds.

=== Scientific research ===
In the late 19th century, Minnesota's fossils were studied by researchers like Charles Schuchert and Leo Lesquereux. Schuchert studied strata in southeastern Minnesota in Goodhue, Olmsted and Fillmore County. Lesquereux documented more than two hundred kinds of Cretaceous plants. Among these were ten species of conifers, six species of cycad, 175 species of dicotyledon, one species of Equisetum, six ferns, and three kinds of monocotyledons. Lequereux saw the rapid appearance of dicots in the middle Cretaceous with no evidence of transitional forms as evidence for a profound and rapid evolutionary event unique in the whole fossil record.

== Natural history museums ==
- Bell Museum of Natural History, Minneapolis
- Science Museum of Minnesota, Saint Paul

== See also ==
- Paleontology in Iowa
- Paleontology in North Dakota
- Paleontology in South Dakota
- Paleontology in Wisconsin
