= Bullion Creek Formation =

Geologic formation in North Dakota

- Stratigraphic range: Thanetian; ~58–55 Ma
- Type: Formation
- Underlies: Sentinel Butte Formation
- Overlies: Slope and Cannonball formations

Location
- Region: North Dakota
- Country: United States

The Bullion Creek Formation is a geologic formation in western North Dakota. It preserves bones and tracks of an extinct crocodile and other fossils of Late Paleocene age.

== See also ==
- List of fossiliferous stratigraphic units in North Dakota
- Paleontology in North Dakota
