= Sentinel Butte Formation =

Geological formation in North Dakota, USA

- Stratigraphic range: Thanetian; ~58–55 Ma
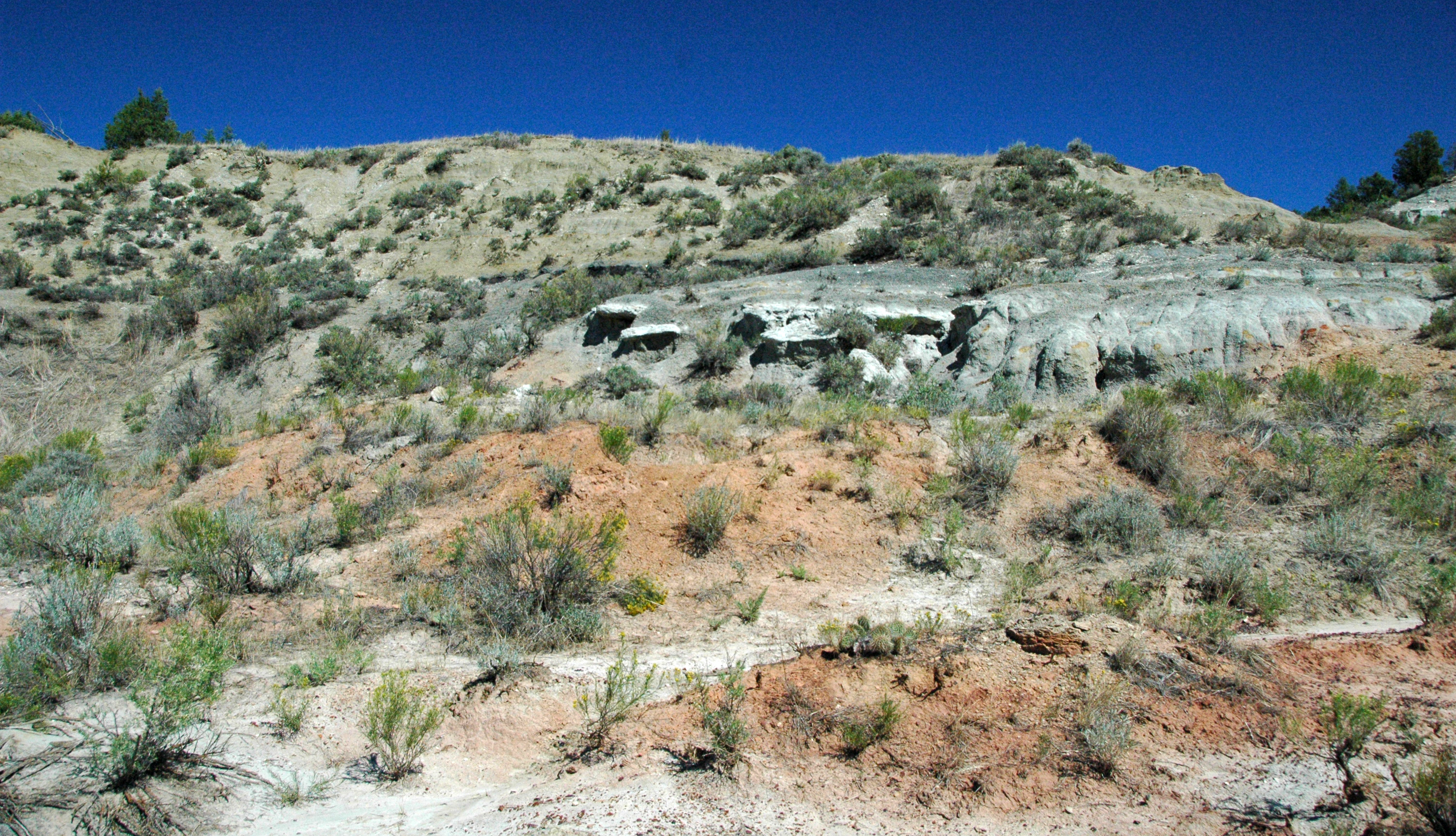
- Bentonite (Big Blue Bentonite) in the Sentinel Butte Formation (North Dakota)
- Type: Formation
- Unit of: Fort Union Formation
- Underlies: Golden Valley Formation
- Overlies: Bullion Creek Formation

Location
- Region: North Dakota
- Country: United States

The Sentinel Butte Formation is a geologic formation of Paleocene age in the Williston Basin of western North Dakota. It preserves significant assemblages of non-marine plant and animal fossils.

== See also ==
- List of fossiliferous stratigraphic units in North Dakota
- Paleontology in North Dakota
- Theodore Roosevelt National Park
