= Laurence L. Sloss =

American geologist (1913–1996)

- Born: 26 August 1913; Mountain View
- Died: 2 November 1996 (aged 83); Evanston
- Alma mater: Stanford University; University of Chicago
- Occupation: Geologist
- Awards: William H. Twenhofel Medal (1980); Penrose Medal (1986)
- Academic career
- Institutions: Northwestern University (1947–1981)
- Doctoral advisor: Carey Croneis

Laurence L. Sloss (August 26, 1913 – November 2, 1996) was an American geologist. He taught geology at Northwestern University from 1947 until his retirement in 1981.

He was president of the Geological Society of America (GSA), with his tenure beginning in 1980. The GSA's Laurence L. Sloss Award is named in his honor. He was also president of the Society for Sedimentary Geology and American Geosciences Institute.

== Education and field work ==
Sloss received his bachelor's degree at Stanford University and his Ph.D. at the University of Chicago in 1937.

He is known as a pioneer in the discipline of sequence stratigraphy, and for his descriptions of cratonic sequences or "Sloss sequences" in ancient North America. As a whole, these sequences are large-scale cycles in sedimentary rock records that indicate broad patterns of environmental change over geologic time – specifically marine transgression and regression.

== Awards and recognition ==
He was awarded the William H. Twenhofel Medal from the American Association of Petroleum Geologists in 1980 and the Geological Society of America's Penrose Medal in 1986.
