= Zuñi sequence =

Jurassic-Cretaceous cratonic sequence

The Zuñi sequence was the major cratonic sequence after the Absaroka sequence that began in the latest Jurassic, peaked in the late Cretaceous, and ended by the start of the following Paleocene. Though it was not the final major transgression, it was the last complete sequence to cover the North American craton; the following Tejas sequence was much less extensive.

== Cause and progression ==
Like other sequences, the Zuñi was probably caused by a mantle plume - more specifically, the Mid-Cretaceous Superplume event. A mass of unusually hot rock rose from the lower mantle to the base of the lithosphere, fueling a dramatic increase in seafloor spreading rates; this caused the hotter mid-ocean ridges to increase in volume, thus displacing the oceans onto the continents.

Sea level rose in earnest beginning in the early Cretaceous, until by Cenomanian time it was roughly 250 metres (800+ feet) higher than today. This was the time of the great Western Interior Seaway and the widespread continental deposition of carbonates and shale elsewhere. There were also intervals where black shale accumulated in abundance on the continents, indicative of a stagnant water column; apparently water in the polar oceans was too warm to sink and oxygenate the deep-sea, as it does today. Many of these black shales are now rich in petroleum sources.

The waters of the Zuñi sequence began to subside late in the Cretaceous period, and by the early Cenozoic a new craton-wide unconformity in North America indicates a complete regression before the Tejas sequence of the late Paleogene.

== See also ==
- Ontong-Java Plateau
- Sequence stratigraphy
