= Kaskaskia sequence =

Kaskaskia Sequence
- Stratigraphic range: Emsian-Serpukhovian; ~389.0–323.2 Ma
- Type: Sequence
- Underlies: Absaroka sequence
- Overlies: Tippecanoe sequence

Location
- Country: United States; Canada

The Kaskaskia sequence was a cratonic sequence that began in the mid-Devonian, peaked early in the Mississippian, and ended by mid-Mississippian time. A major unconformity separates it from the lower Tippecanoe sequence, called the "Wallbridge Unconformity".

The basal—that is, the lowest and oldest—units of the Kaskaskia consist of clean quartz sandstones eroded from the Appalachian orogenic belt to the east, the Ozark Dome in the center of the continent, and south from the Canadian Shield. These sandstones are followed by extensive carbonates, though these are often difficult to distinguish from preceding Tippecanoe carbonates. In western North America the Kaskaskia is well known for its widespread carbonate and evaporite strata, which in fact compose most of the rocks; the Williston Basin in Canada is a superb example of such evaporite deposits.

Beginning in the middle to late Devonian, black shales such as the Marcellus Formation, begin to dominate in the rocks, composed of detritus eroded from the uplifted Acadian highlands to the west; they also indicate widespread anoxic conditions across the sea floor. By mid-Mississippian time however, shallow-water carbonate deposition resumed, until the final regression of the epeiric seas late in the period.
