= Tippecanoe sequence =

Tippecanoe Sequence
- Stratigraphic range: Dapingian-Emsian; ~470.0 –389.0 Ma
- Type: Sequence
- Sub-units: Cayugan Series
- Underlies: Kaskaskia sequence
- Overlies: Sauk sequence

Lithology
- Primary: Carbonates

Location
- Country: United States; Canada

The Tippecanoe sequence was the cratonic sequence or the marine transgression following the Sauk sequence; it extended from roughly the Middle Ordovician to the Early Devonian. The Tippecanoe is bound by two Unconformities, at the base by the Knox Unconformity, and at its top the Wallbridge Unconformity.

== Sedimentary characteristics ==
After the regression of the Sauk Sea early in the Ordovician, the exposed craton for a time underwent vigorous erosion, due to being located in a tropical climate; indeed, at this point in the Paleozoic the North American continent roughly straddled the equator.

The Tippecanoe transgression ended this period of erosion, beginning with the deposition of clean sandstones across the craton, followed by abundant carbonate deposition. In the east these carbonates gradually become shales, representing sediments eroded from highlands created in the Taconic orogeny.

The Tippecanoe sequence may have been the deepest of the Paleozoic. At one point during the Silurian period, the Taconic highlands were the only part of North America that was not submerged. The massive evaporite deposits of the Michigan Basin and parts of the Appalachian Basin were formed during this period.

The Tippecanoe sequence ended with a regression in the early Devonian, to be followed later by the Kaskaskia sequence.
