= Cratonic sequence =

Very large-scale lithostratographic sequence

The Western Interior Seaway, illustrated at 95 million years ago, was a result of transgression onto the North American continent during the mid-Cretaceous period. Sediment deposited by this seaway is represented in the rock record by the Zuñi sequence.

A cratonic sequence (also known as megasequence, Sloss sequence or supersequence) in geology is a very large-scale lithostratigraphic sequence in the rock record that represents a complete cycle of marine transgression and regression on a craton (block of continental crust) over geologic time. They are geologic evidence of relative sea level rising and then falling (transgressing and regressing), thereby depositing varying layers of sediment onto the craton, now expressed as sedimentary rock. Places such as the Grand Canyon are a good visual example of this process, demonstrating the changes between layers deposited over time as the ancient environment changed.

Cratonic sequences were first proposed by Laurence L. Sloss in 1963. Each one represents a time when inland seas deposited sediments across the craton. The top and bottom edges of a sequence are each bounded by craton-wide unconformities (time gaps in the rock record). The unconformities indicate when the seas receded and sediment was eroded rather than deposited.

== Cause and chronology ==
These sequences may in part represent eustatic (global) change in sea level; however, when the proper names are used they usually refer to relative sea level changes on the North American continent. The most likely causes of these cycles is change in mid-ocean ridge volume, which is related to seafloor spreading rates. When Earth's mid-ocean ridges spread rapidly, the ridges tend to be longer than usual; also, the greater heat elevates the lithosphere over the ridges. This elevated lithosphere displaces seawater onto the continents; conversely, when spreading rates decline, the ridges subside, and the seas drain from the cratons. It is also possible that other mechanisms, such as dynamic topography related to mantle mass anomalies, and intraplate stress related to episodes of contractional and extensional tectonics, play a part by causing significant tectonic uplift and subsidence across the craton.

There have been six cratonic sequences since the beginning of the Cambrian Period. For North America, from oldest to youngest, they are the Sauk, Tippecanoe, Kaskaskia, Absaroka, Zuñi, and Tejas sequences. Attempts to identify equivalent cratonic sequences on other continents have met with only limited success, suggesting that eustasy (total global sea-level change) is unlikely to be the sole responsible mechanism.

== See also ==
- Sea level – Geographical reference point from which various heights are measured
- Sequence stratigraphy – Study and analysis of groups of sedimentary deposits
