= Tejas sequence =

Last major marine transgression across the North American craton

The Tejas sequence was the last major marine transgression across the North American craton. Following the late Cretaceous regression that ended the Zuñi sequence, the oceans advanced again early in the Cenozoic, peaking during the Paleocene and Eocene epochs. There were no dramatic epeiric seas in North America; indeed, the Atlantic coast advanced only as far as the Mississippi Embayment. The Tejas was deeper in Eurasia and Africa, which experienced widespread carbonate deposition during the Eocene. There was a final transgression before the end of the Oligocene, the end of which marked the end of the Tejas sequence.

== See also ==
- Cratonic sequence
- Sequence stratigraphy
