= Hell Creek Formation =

Geological formation in the United States

- Stratigraphic range: Late Cretaceous to Early Paleogene, Maastrichtian–Danian (Lancian); ~68–65.5 Ma
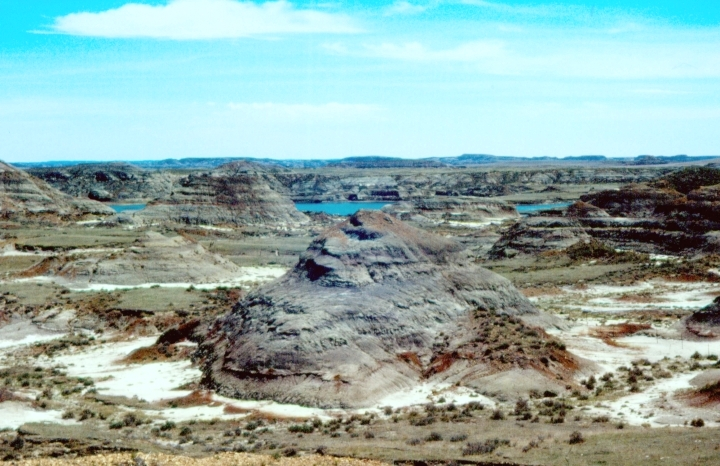
- Exposure in the badlands near Fort Peck Reservoir
- Type: Geological formation
- Unit of: Montana Group
- Sub-units: Breien, Little Beaver Creek, Middle Sandstone & Pretty Butte Members
- Underlies: Fort Union Formation
- Overlies: Fox Hills Formation
- Thickness: 50–100 m (160–330 ft)

Lithology
- Primary: Claystone, mudstone
- Other: Sandstone, siltstone, conglomerate, amber

Location
- Coordinates: 46.9°N 101.5°W
- Approximate paleocoordinates: 52.6°N 74.4°W
- Region: Montana, North Dakota, South Dakota, Wyoming
- Country: United States
- Extent: Williston Basin

Type section
- Named for: Hell Creek, Jordan, Montana
- Named by: Barnum Brown
- Year defined: 1907
- Hell Creek Formation (the United States) Hell Creek Formation (Montana)

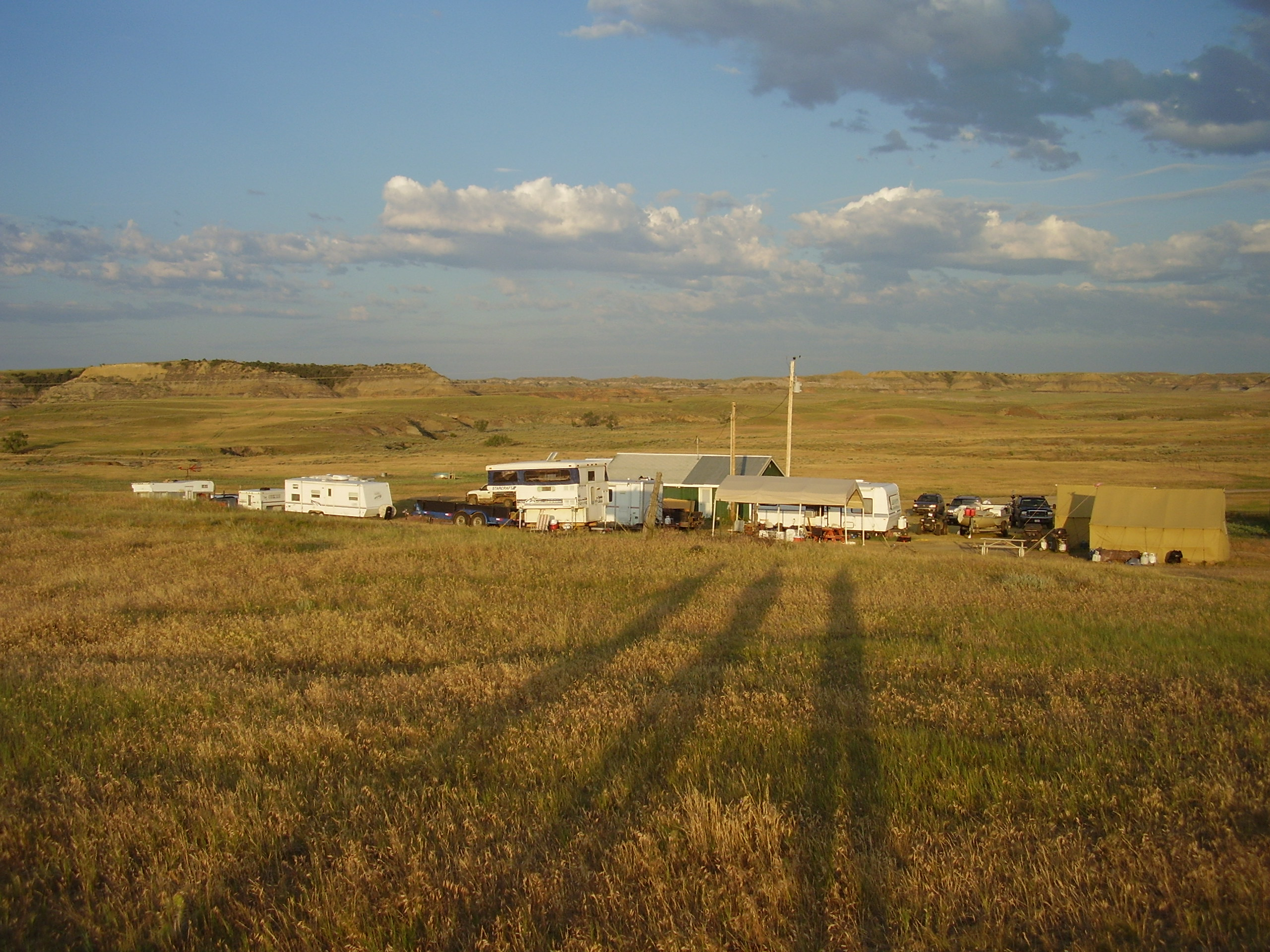
Paleontological camp of Museum of the Rockies in eastern Montana – Hell Creek Formation (summer dig season 2009)

The Hell Creek Formation is an intensively studied division of mostly Upper Cretaceous and some lower Paleocene rocks in North America, named for exposures studied along Hell Creek, near Jordan, Montana. The formation stretches over portions of Montana, North Dakota, South Dakota, and Wyoming. In Montana, the Hell Creek Formation overlies the Fox Hills Formation. The site of Pompeys Pillar National Monument is a small isolated section of the Hell Creek Formation. In 1966, the Hell Creek Fossil Area was designated as a National Natural Landmark by the National Park Service.

It is a series of fresh and brackish-water clays, mudstones, and sandstones deposited during the Maastrichtian and Danian (respectively, the end of the Cretaceous period and the beginning of the Paleogene) by fluvial activity in fluctuating river channels and deltas and very occasional peaty swamp deposits along the low-lying eastern continental margin fronting the late Cretaceous Western Interior Seaway. The climate was mild; the presence of crocodilians along with palm trees suggests a subtropical and temperate climate with no prolonged freeze. The famous iridium-enriched Cretaceous–Paleogene boundary, which separates the Cretaceous from the Cenozoic, occurs as a discontinuous but distinct thin marker bedding above and occasionally within the formation, near its boundary with the overlying Fort Union Formation.

The world's largest collection of Hell Creek fossils is housed and exhibited at the Museum of the Rockies in Bozeman, Montana. The specimens displayed are the result of the museum's Hell Creek Project, a joint effort between the museum; Montana State University; the University of Washington; the University of California, Berkeley; the University of North Dakota; and the University of North Carolina which began in 1998.

== Description ==
The Hell Creek Formation is an intensively studied geological formation of mostly Upper Cretaceous and some Early Paleocene rocks in North America, named for exposures studied along Hell Creek, near Jordan, Montana. The formation stretches over portions of Montana, North Dakota, South Dakota, and Wyoming. In Montana, the Hell Creek Formation overlies the Fox Hills Formation.

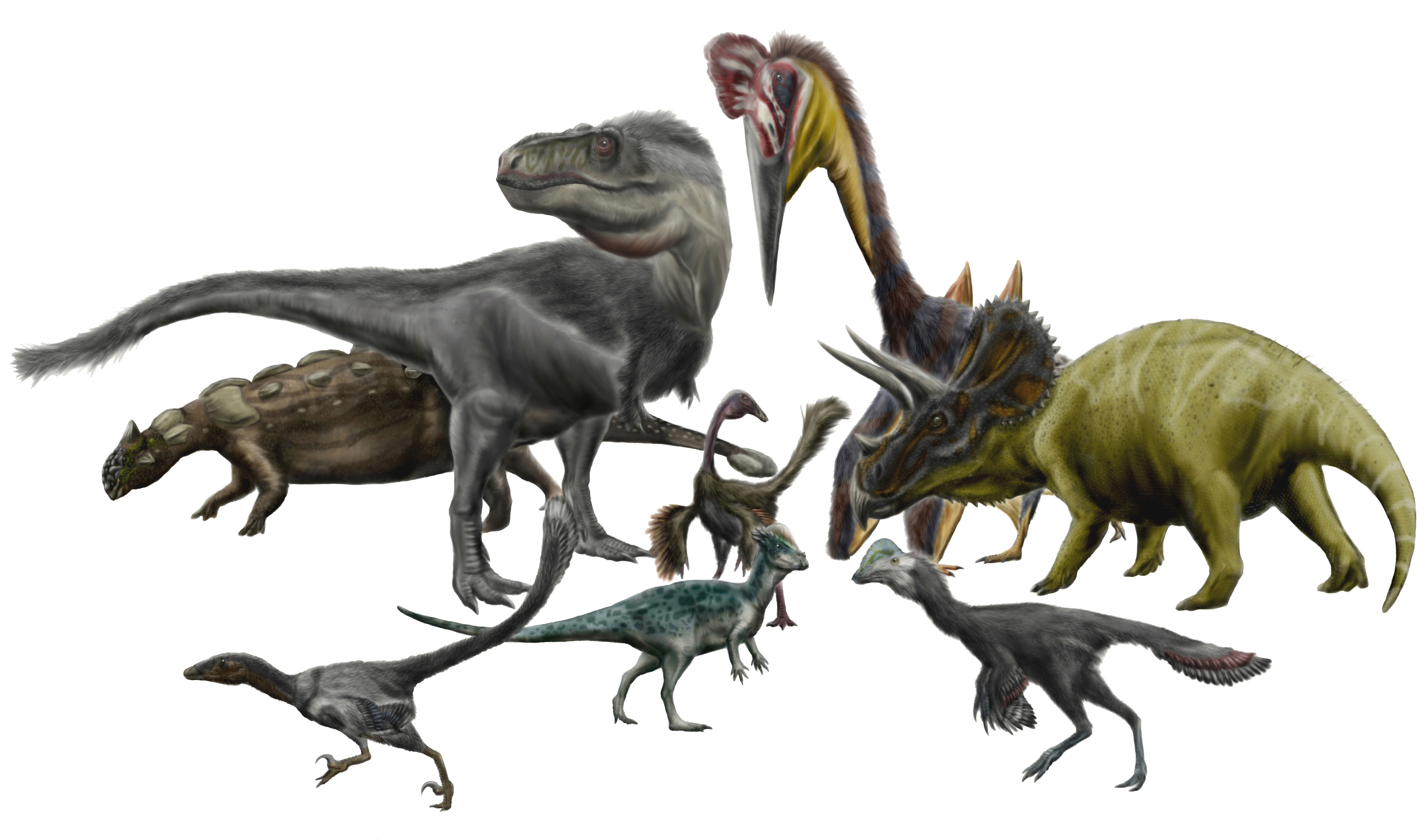
Dinosaurs and pterosaurs of Hell Creek Formation

In 1966, the Hell Creek Fossil Area was designated as a National Natural Landmark by the National Park Service.

== Geology ==
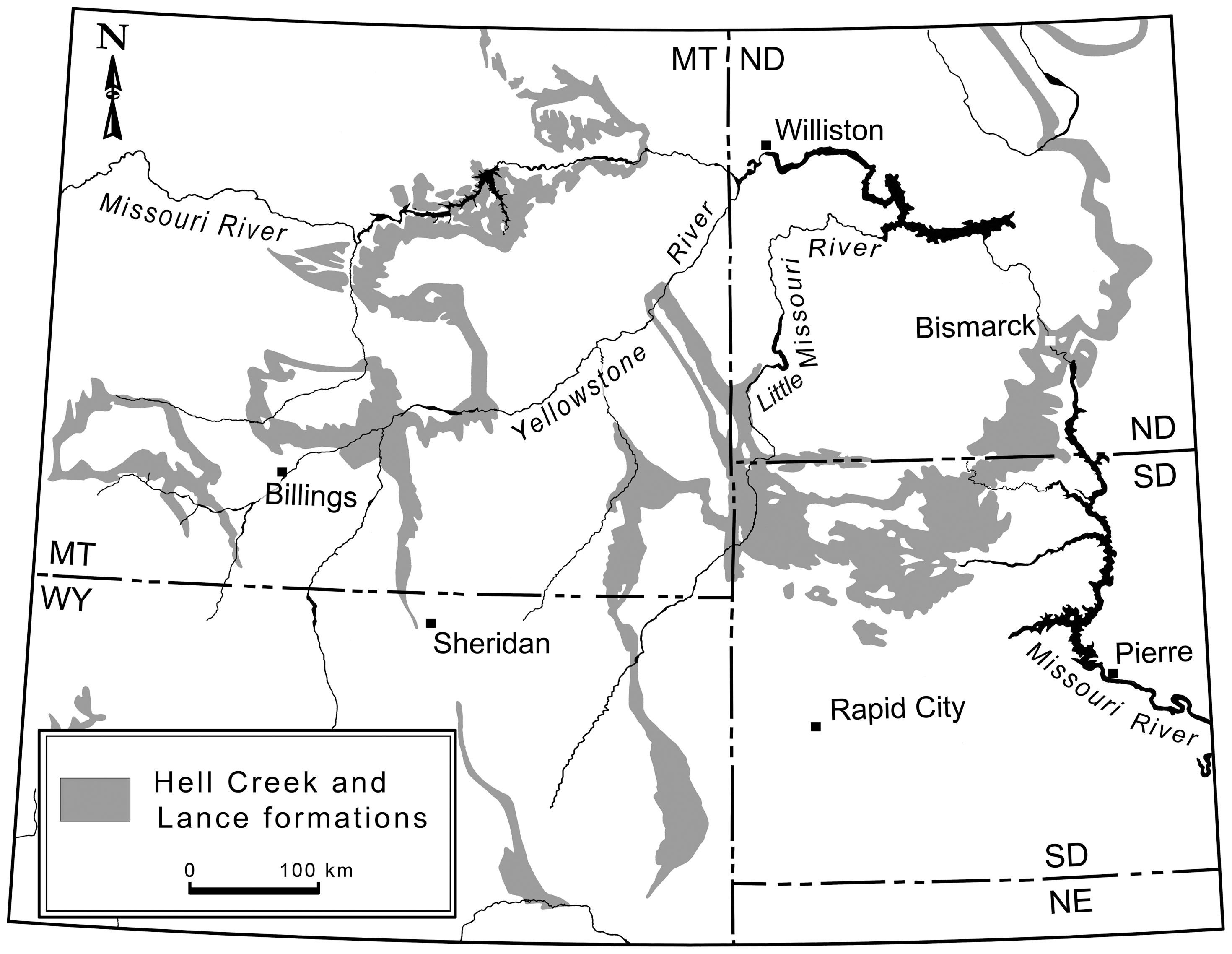
Map of the Hell Creek and Lance Formations in western North America

The Hell Creek Formation in Montana overlies the Fox Hills Formation and underlies the Fort Union Formation, and the boundary with the latter occurs near the Cretaceous–Paleogene boundary (K–Pg), which defines the end of the Cretaceous period and has been dated to 65.5 Mya. The 90-metre (300 ft) thickness of the formation is estimated to have been deposited in about 2 million years. Lancian fauna characteristic of Hell Creek are found as high as a few meters below the boundary.

The K–Pg boundary is generally situated near the contact between the upper Hell Creek and the lower Ludlow member of the Fort Union Formation, though in some areas (e.g. in North Dakota) the boundary is well within the Ludlow member, 3 metres (9.8 ft) above the boundary with the Hell Creek. On the other hand, in some small regions of Montana, the Hell Creek Formation contains the K–Pg boundary, and extends slightly into the Paleogene.

The Tanis site in North Dakota contains possible evidence of the Chicxulub meteorite impact—such as the chaotic mixing of fossil carcasses and a layer of glass tektites with associated impact impressions—deposited minutes to hours after the impact.

== Paleobiology ==
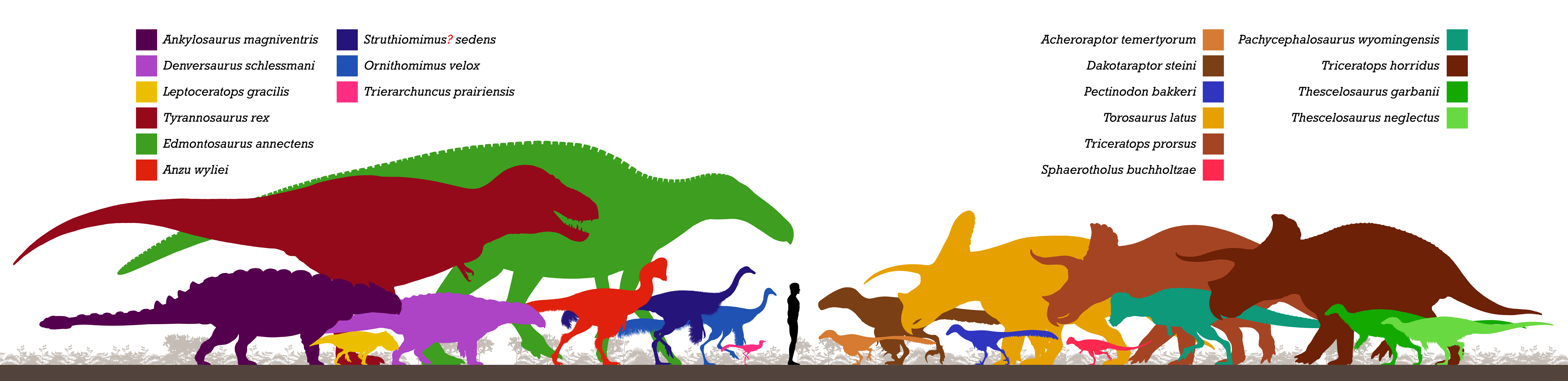
Hell Creek fauna

The remains of many animals including dinosaurs were found in the Hell Creek Formation. Its location at the changing conjunction of the eastern coast of Laramidia and the adjacent western shallows of the Western Interior Seaway led to the preservation of fossils of both marine and terrestrial creatures. Vertebrates include dinosaurs, pterosaurs, crocodiles, champsosaurs, lizards, snakes, turtles, frogs and salamanders. Remains of fishes and mammals have also been found in the Hell Creek Formation. The formation has produced impressive assemblages of invertebrates (including ammonites), plants, mammals, fish, reptiles (including the lizard Obamadon), marine reptiles (including the marine reptiles like mosasaurs, plesiosaurs and sea turtles), and amphibians. Notable dinosaur finds include Tyrannosaurus and Triceratops, ornithomimids as well, caenagnathids like Anzu, a variety of small theropods, pachycephalosaurs, ankylosaurs, crocodylomorphs and squamates, including various animal fossils unearthed in the Hell Creek Formation. The most complete hadrosaurid dinosaur ever found, an Edmontosaurus, was retrieved in 2000 from the Hell Creek Formation and widely publicized in a National Geographic documentary aired in December 2007. A few bird, mammal, and pterosaur fossils have also been found. The teeth of sharks and rays are sometimes found in the riverine Hell Creek Formation, suggesting that some of these taxa were then, as now, tolerant of fresh water. The Lancian fauna is more similar overall phylogenetically to East Asian and Canadian/Alaskan faunas than most Campanian North American faunas. Fossil insects from inclusions found within amber are known.

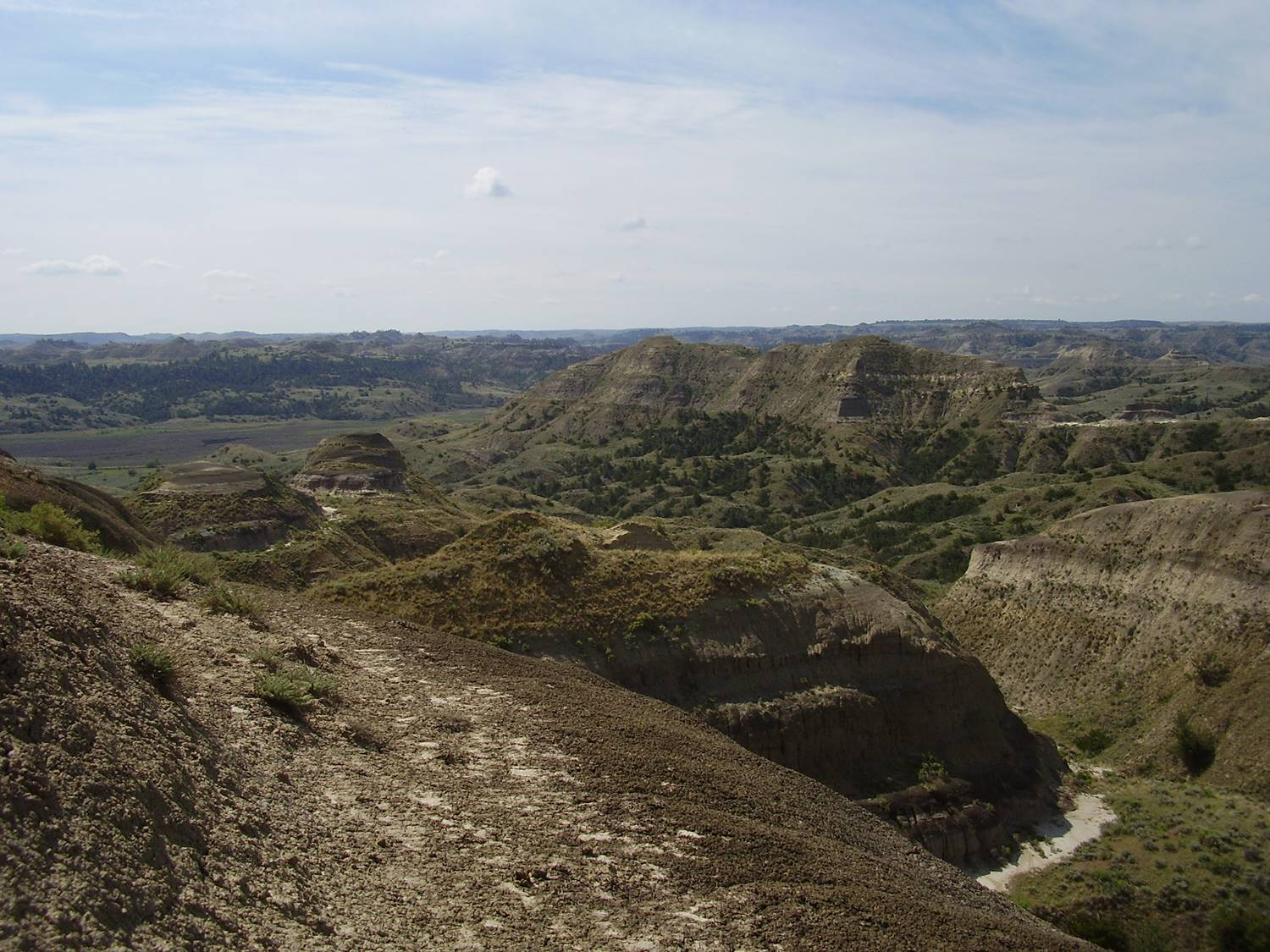
View of Hell Creek State Park, the "heart" of Hell Creek Formation

== Depositional environment ==
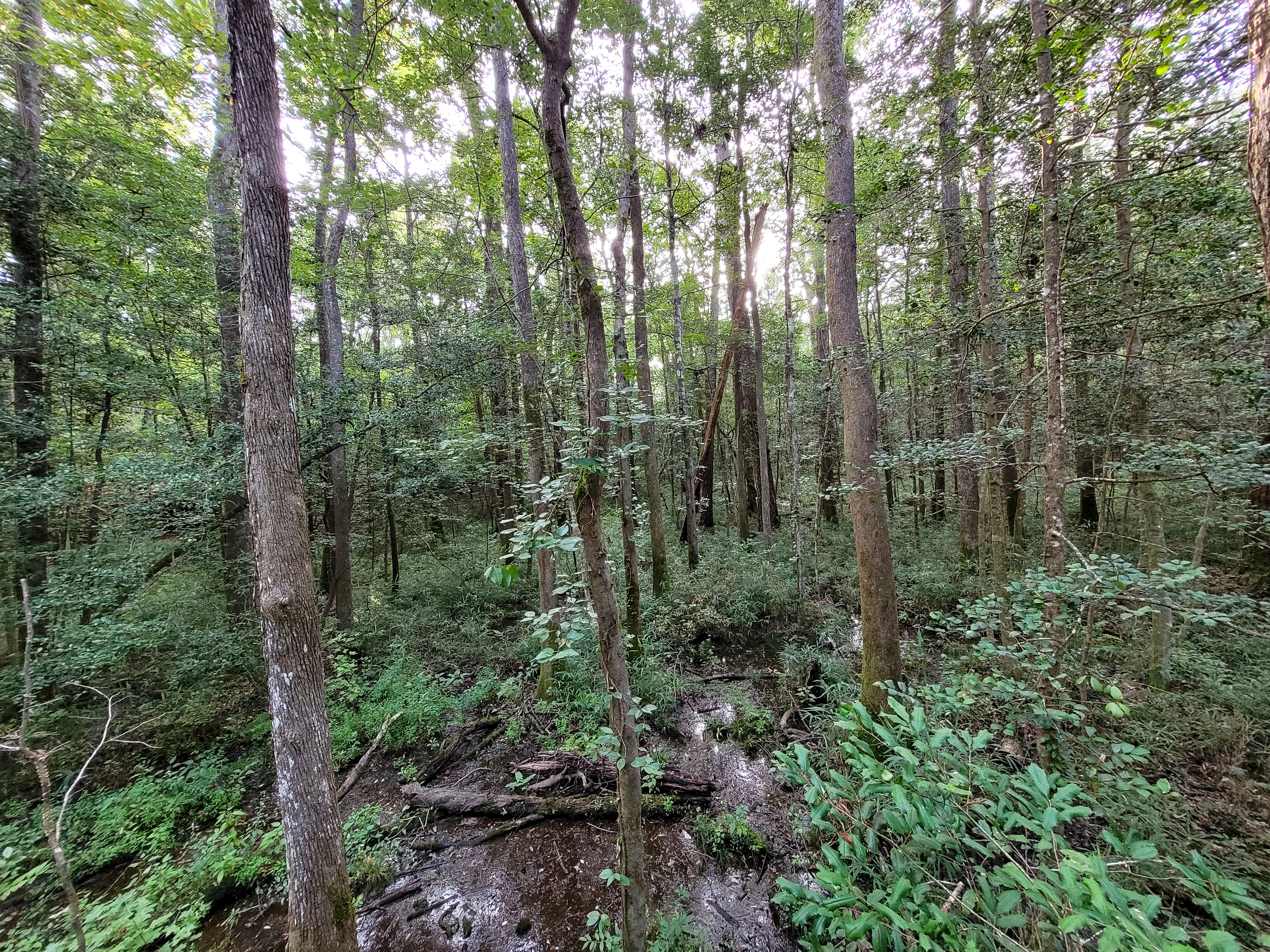
The dominant plants of the Hell Creek Formation are mainly flowering plants.

It is a series of fresh and brackish-water clays, mudstones, and sandstones deposited during the Maastrichtian and Danian (respectively, the end of the Cretaceous period and the beginning of the Paleogene) by fluvial activity in fluctuating channels and deltas and very occasional peaty swamp deposits along the low-lying eastern continental margin fronting the late Cretaceous Western Interior Seaway. The Hell Creek Formation, as typified by exposures in the Fort Peck area of Montana, has been interpreted as a flat, forested floodplain with a relatively temperate climate that supported a variety of plants ranging from angiosperm trees to gymnosperms such as the conifers, cycadeoids and ginkgos to ferns and moss. The Hell Creek Formation was laid down by streams, on a coastal plain along the edge of the Western Interior Seaway. The presence of crocodylians suggests climate was warm; there was no severe cold season and probably ample precipitation.

The Hell Creek Formation, Lance Formation and Scollard Formation represent different sections of the western shore of the shallow sea that divided western and eastern North America during the Cretaceous. Swampy lowlands were the habitat of various animals, including dinosaurs. A broad coastal plain extended westward from the seaway to the newly formed Rocky Mountains. These formations are composed largely of sandstone and mudstone which have been attributed to floodplain, fluvial, lacustrine, swamp, estuarine and coastal plain environments. Hell Creek is the best studied of these ancient environments. At the time, this region had a warm temperate, seasonal climate. The climate was sub-humid, with flowering plants, conifers, palm trees, and ferns in the swamps, and conifers, canopy, understory plants, high diversity of angiosperm trees and shrubs in the forests. In northwestern South Dakota, strips of black layers deposited in the wetland environment are rich in coal, and a bright band-like layer of sand and mud from the river floodplain accumulated. Many plant species were supported, primarily angiosperms, and less commonly conifers, ferns and cycadeoids. An abundance of fossil leaves are found at dozens of different sites indicating that the area was largely forested by small- to medium-sized trees. A leaf analysis of the Hell Creek I floral zone produced a mean annual temperature of 11.3–11.6 °C (52.3–52.9 °F), a warm month mean temperature of 20.1–20.5 °C (68.2–68.9 °F), and a cold month mean temperature of 2.6 °C (36.7 °F) with a mean annual precipitation of 191–197 centimetres (75–78 in), placing the lower Hell Creek Formation in the Cfb climate zone.

== Fossil content ==
=== Dinosaurs ===
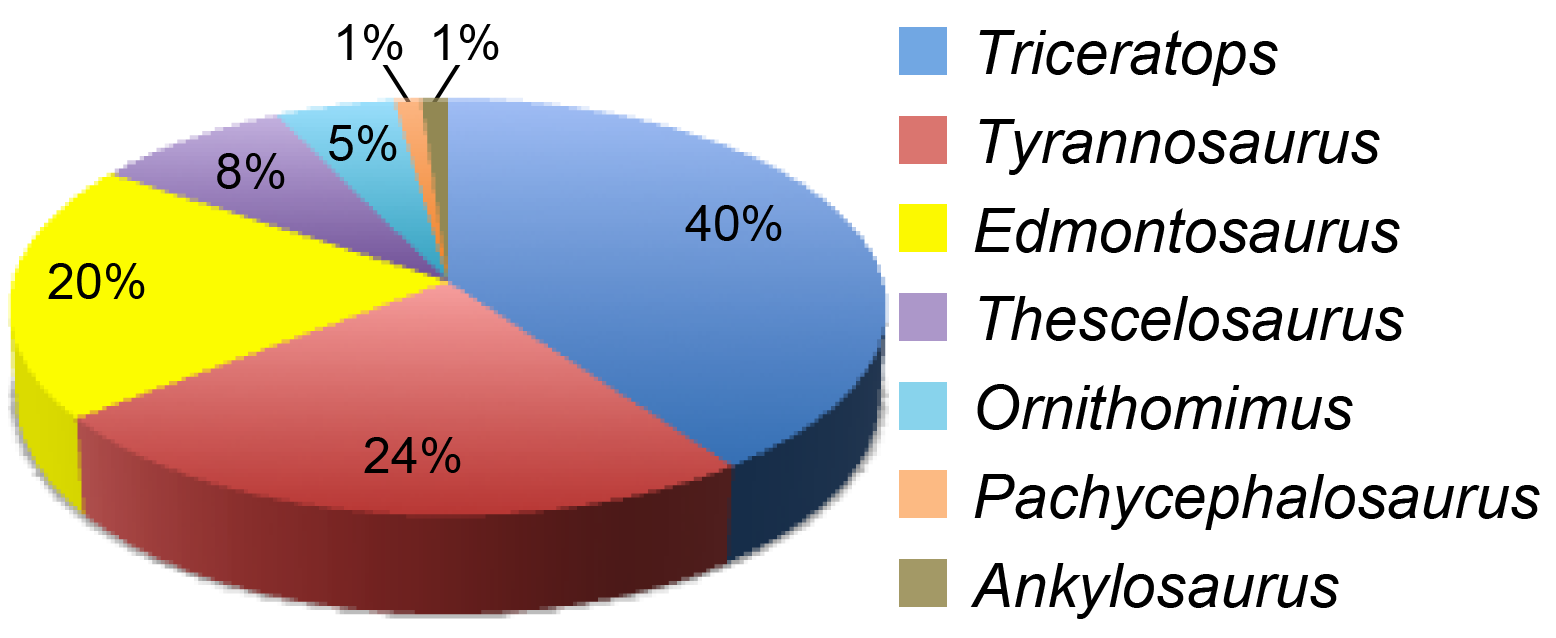
Pie chart of the time averaged census for large-bodied dinosaurs from the entire Hell Creek Formation in the study area

A paleo-population study is one of the most difficult of analyses to conduct in field paleontology. Here is the most recent estimate of the proportions of the eight most common dinosaurian families in the Hell Creek Formation, based on detailed field studies by Horner, Goodwin, and Myhrvold (2011)

- Ceratopsidae 40%
- Tyrannosauridae 24%
- Hadrosauridae 20%
- Hypsilophodontidae 8%
- Ornithomimidae 5%
- Ankylosauridae 1%
- Pachycephalosauridae 1%
- Troodontidae 1% (represented only by teeth)
- Dromaeosauridae 1% (represented only by teeth)

Outcrops sampled by the Hell Creek Project were divided into three sections: lower, middle and upper slices. The top and bottom sections were the focus of the PLoS One report, and within each portion many remains of Triceratops, Edmontosaurus, and Tyrannosaurus were found. Triceratops was the most common in each section, but Tyrannosaurus was just as common, if not slightly more common, than the hadrosaur Edmontosaurus. In the upper Hell Creek section, for example, the census included twenty-two Triceratops, five Tyrannosaurus, and five Edmontosaurus.

The dinosaurs Thescelosaurus, Ornithomimus, Pachycephalosaurus and Ankylosaurus were also included in the breakdown, but were relatively rare. Other dinosaur genera were reported as being rare, and are therefore not included in the breakdown.

Fossil footprints of dinosaurs from the Hell Creek Formation are very rare. As of 2017, there is only one find of a possible Tyrannosaurus rex footprint, dating from 2007 and described a year later. The largest Triceratops skull ever discovered, nicknamed 'Dragon King', was found in Glendive, Montana, which is in the Hell Creek Formation.

==== Eumaniraptorans ====
Historically, numerous teeth have been attributed to various Dromaeosaurid and Troodontid taxa with known body fossils from only older formations, including Dromaeosaurus, Saurornitholestes, and Troodon. However, in a 2013 study, Evans et al. concluded that there is little evidence for more than a single dromaeosaurid taxon, Acheroraptor, in the Hell Creek-Lance assemblages, which would render these taxa invalid for this formation. This was disproved in a 2015 study, DePalma et al., when they described the new genus Dakotaraptor, a large species of dromaeosaur. Fossilized teeth of various troodontids and coelurosaurs are common throughout the Hell Creek Formation; the best known examples include Paronychodon, Pectinodon and Richardoestesia, respectively.

=== Flora ===
The Hell Creek Formation was a low floodplain at the time before the sea retreated, and in the wet ground of the dense woodland, the diversity of angiosperms and conifers were present. A diversity of herbaceous flowering plants, ferns and moss grew in the forest understory. On the exposed point bars of large river systems, there were shrubs and vines. The evidence of the forested environment is supported by petrified wood, rooted gley paleosols, and ubiquitous tree leaves. The presence of the simple and lobed leaves, combined with a high dicot diversity, extinct cycadeoid Nilssoniocladus, Ginkgo, many types of monocots, and several types of conifers is different from any modern plant community. There are numerous types of leaves, seeds, flowers and other structures from Angiosperms, or flowering plants. The Hell Creek Formation of this layer contains over 300 tablets, of which angiosperms are the most diverse and dominant flora of the population, about 90 percent, followed by about 5% of conifers, 4% of ferns, and others. Compared to today Hell Creek's flora which is prairie, then Hell Creek's flora was hardwood forest mixed with deciduous and evergreen forest. In sharp contrast to the Great Plains today, the presence of some thermophilous taxa such as palm trees and gingers meant the climate was warmer and wetter then.

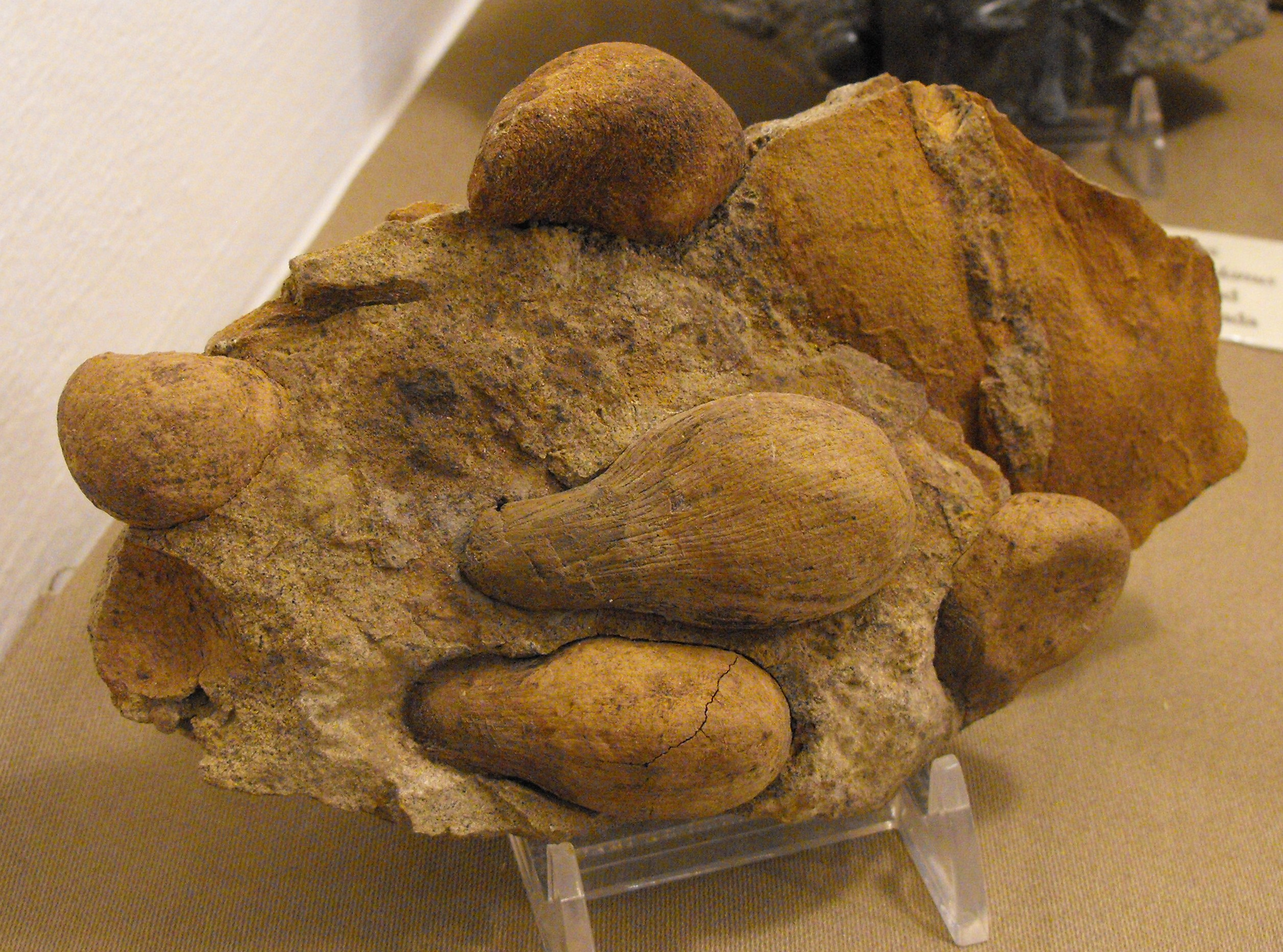
Fossil fruits from the Hell Creek Formation of Spinifructus antiquus of the palm family (Arecaceae)

The plants of the Hell Creek Formation generally represent angiosperm-dominated riparian forests of variable diversity, depending on stratigraphic position and sedimentary environment. There appears to be floral transitions visible on a stratigraphic range from the lower to the upper Hell Creek Formation. For this reason, Kirk Johnson and Leo Hickey divided it into five zones and described them as HCIa, HCIb, HCIIa, HCIIb, and HCIII as a reflection of floral change through time. For example, the HCIa zone is dominated by "Dryophyllum" subfalcatum, Leepierceia preartocarpoides, "Vitis" stantonii, and "Celastrus" taurenensis, and is located 55 to 105 meters below the K–Pg boundary layer. Although the HCIb zone is a very thin layer, about 5 meters (16 ft) of rock, it bears unusually high diversity of herbaceous and shrubby plants, including Urticaceae, Ranunculaceae, Rosaceae, and Cannabaceae.

There is evidence of transitional floras in the middle of the Hell Creek Formation as shown by HCII and HCIII zones. The HCII flora represents a transitional period where taxa from the lower Hell Creek are replaced by the HCIII flora. The diversity of the HCIII zone is very high, and its composition is more uniform than that of HCII, many of which were rare or absent from the zones below, and some others that used to be common below became rarer in the HCIII zone. These forms include Elatides longifolia, "Dryophyllum" tennessensis, Liriodendrites bradacii, and many members of the Laurales including Bisonia niemii, "Ficus" planicostata, and Marmarthia trivialis, while "Celastrus" taurenensis, Leepierceia preartocarpoides, and many cupressaceous conifers became rarer. This phenomenon suggests that the global temperature was warming during the last 300,000-500,000 years of the Cretaceous period.

There is no evidence of fern prairies in the Hell Creek Formation. However, there was high angiosperm diversity—common plane trees, "Dryophyllum" subfalcatum, Leepierceia preartocarpoides, and sabal palms—along with extinct cycadeoid Nilssoniocladus, Ginkgo, araucariaceous, taxodiaceous, and cupressaceous conifers. This represents the mixed deciduous and evergreen broad-leaved forest of the Hell Creek landscape. The nature of these forests is uncertain because Johnson found that the majority of the angiosperm and conifer genera are now extinct. He also believes that very roughly 80% of the terrestrial plant taxa died out in what is now Great Plains at the K–Pg boundary. On the other hand, there is a great increase in the abundance of fossil fern spores in the two centimeters of rock that directly overlies the impact fallout layer. This increase in fern spore abundance is commonly referred as "the fern spike" (meaning that if the abundance of spores as a function of stratigraphic position were plotted out, the graph would show a spike just above the impact fallout layer).

Many of the modern plant affinities in the Hell Creek Formation (e.g., those with the prefix "aff." or with quotes around the genus name) may not in reality belong to these genera; instead they could be entirely different plants that resemble modern genera. Therefore, there is some question regarding whether the modern Ficus or Juglans, as two examples, actually lived in the Late Cretaceous.

Compared to the rich Hell Creek Formation fossil plant localities of the Dakotas, relatively few plant specimens have been collected from Montana. A few taxa were collected at Brownie Butte Montana by Shoemaker, but most plants were collected from North Dakota (Slope County) and from South Dakota. Among the localities, the Mud Buttes, located in Bowman County, North Dakota, is probably the richest megaflora assemblage known and the most diverse leaf quarry from the Hell Creek Formation. "TYPE" after the binomial means that it is represented by a type specimen found in the Yale-Peabody Museum collections. "YPM" is the prefix for the Yale-Peabody Museum specimen number; "DMNH" is for the Denver Museum of Nature & Science; "USNM" is for Smithsonian National Museum of Natural History; and so on. The majority of Hell Creek megafloral specimens are collected at the Denver Museum of Nature & Science.

Overview (from Johnson, 2002): 302 plant morphotypes based on leaf only, including:

- 1 bryophyte (mosses and liverworts)
- 11 ferns
- 1 sphenopsid
- 10 conifers
- 1 ginkgo (uncommon)
- 278 angiosperms (roughly 92% of all taxa found)
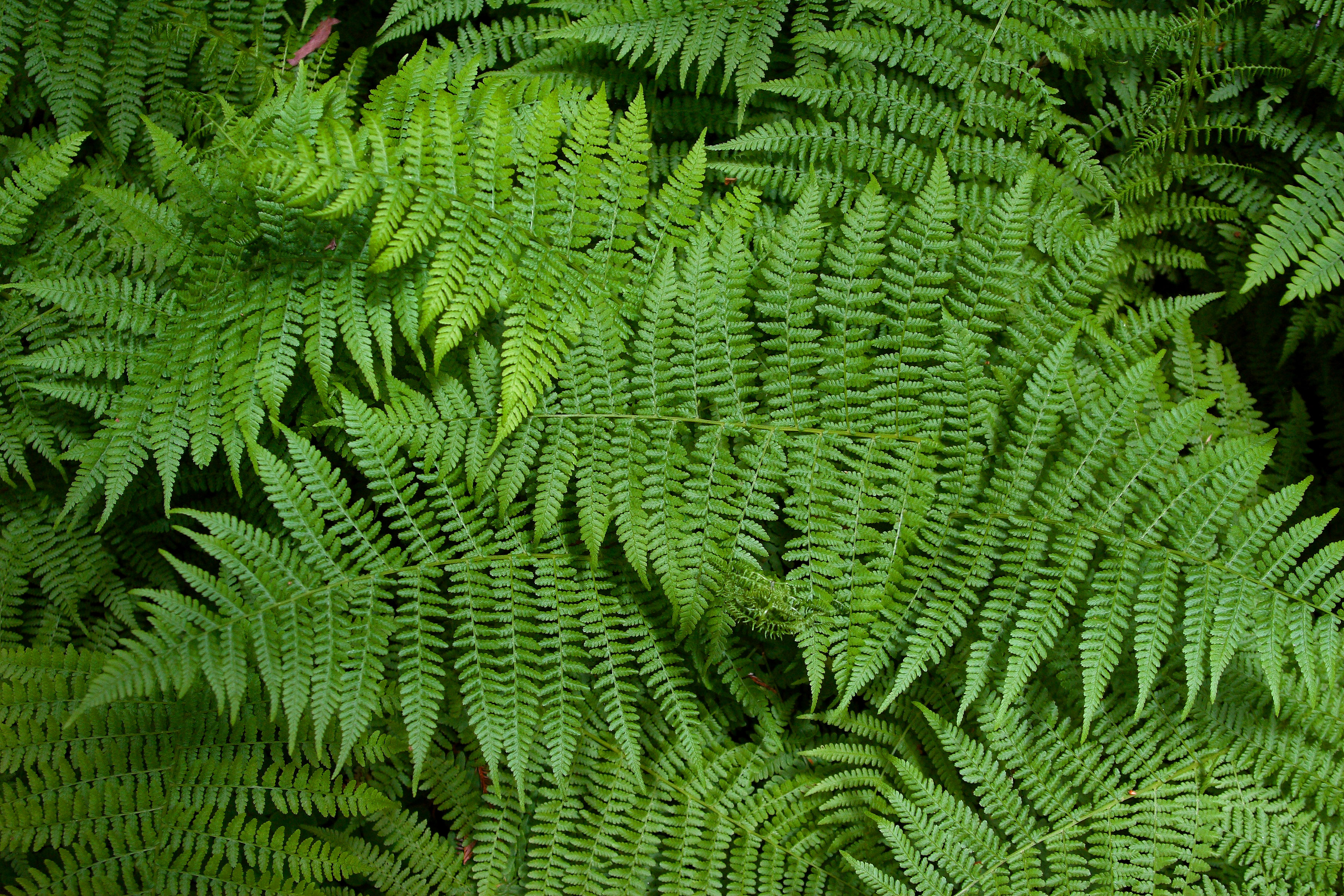
Ferns

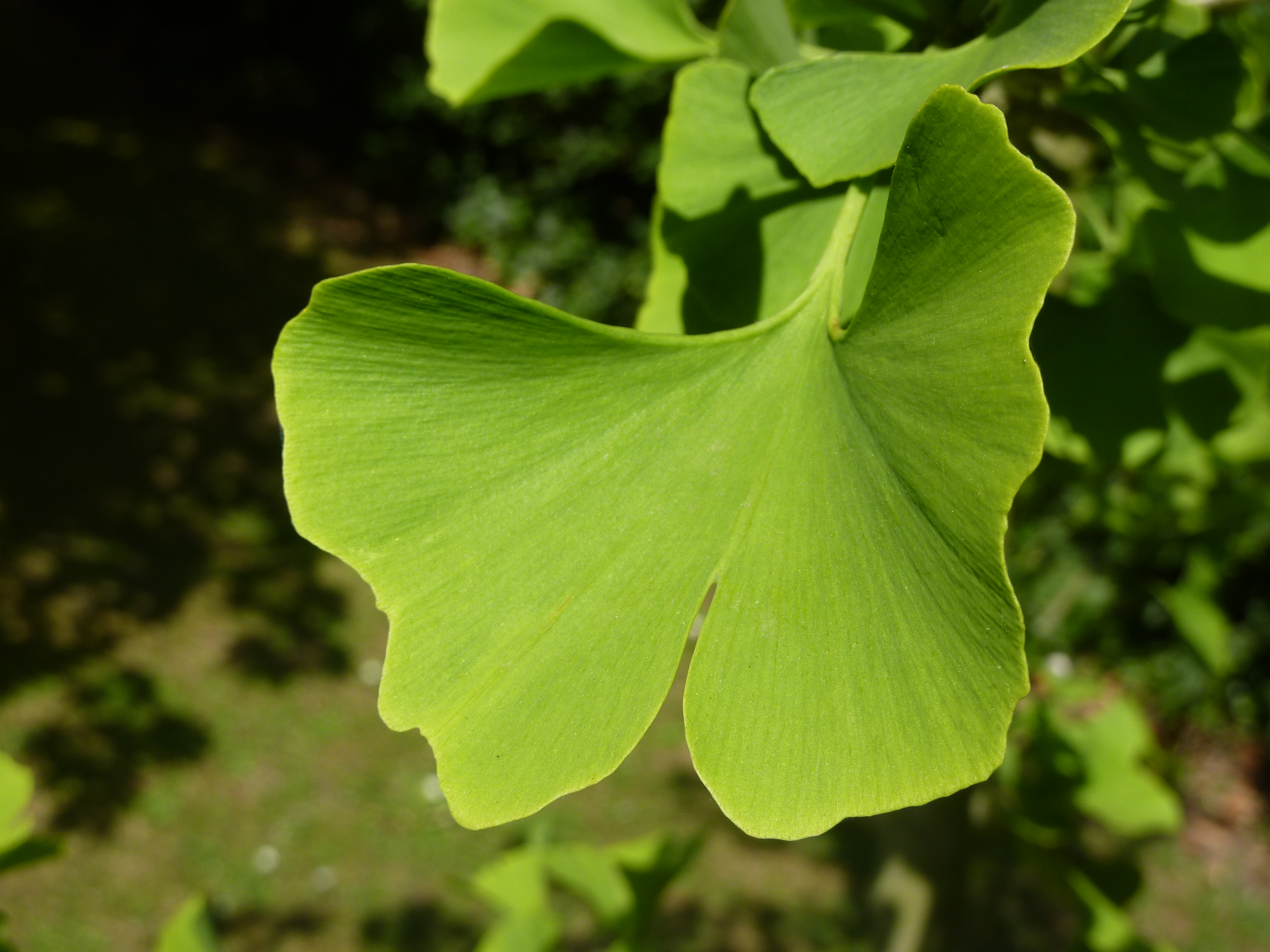
Ginkgo (uncommon)

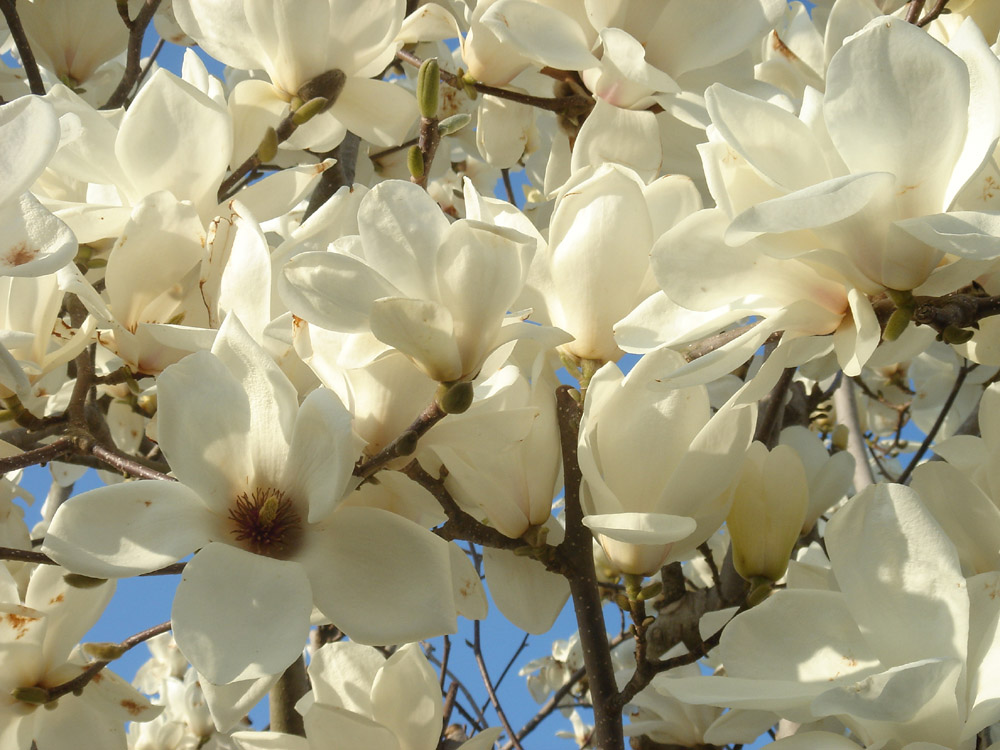
Various angiosperms

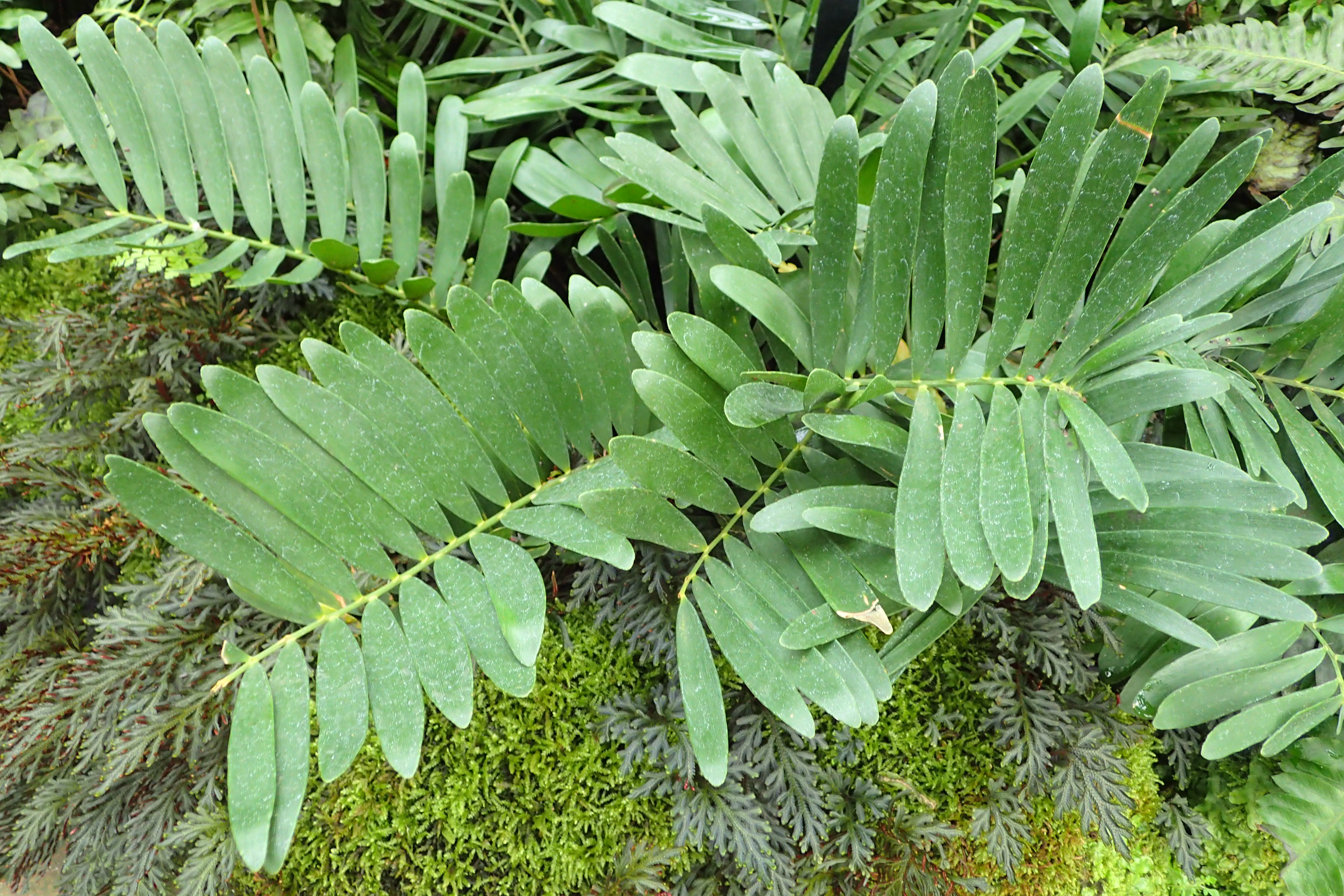
Cycads
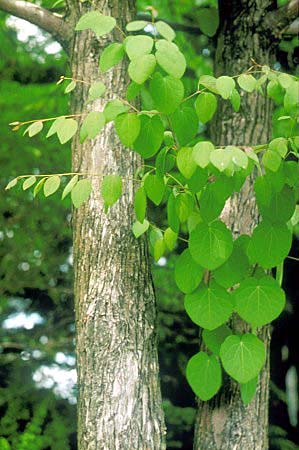
Cercidiphyllum

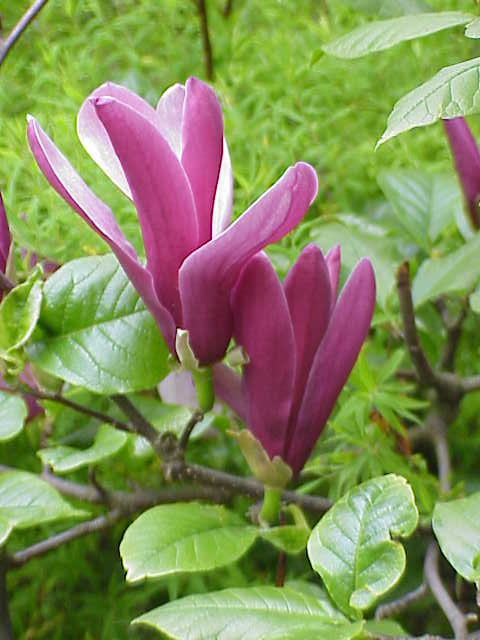
Magnoliaceae(common)

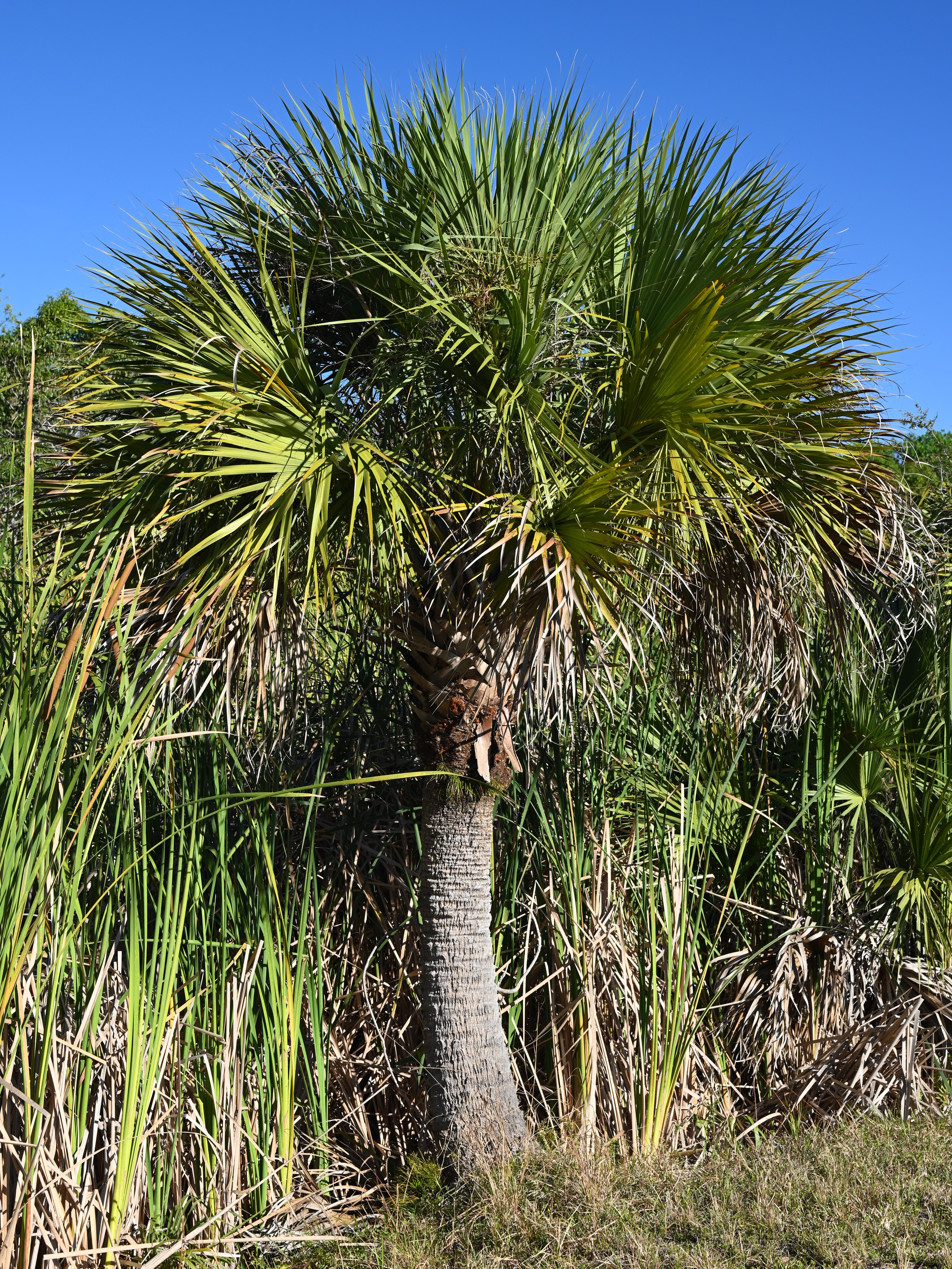
Palm trees indicate a warmer paleoclimate

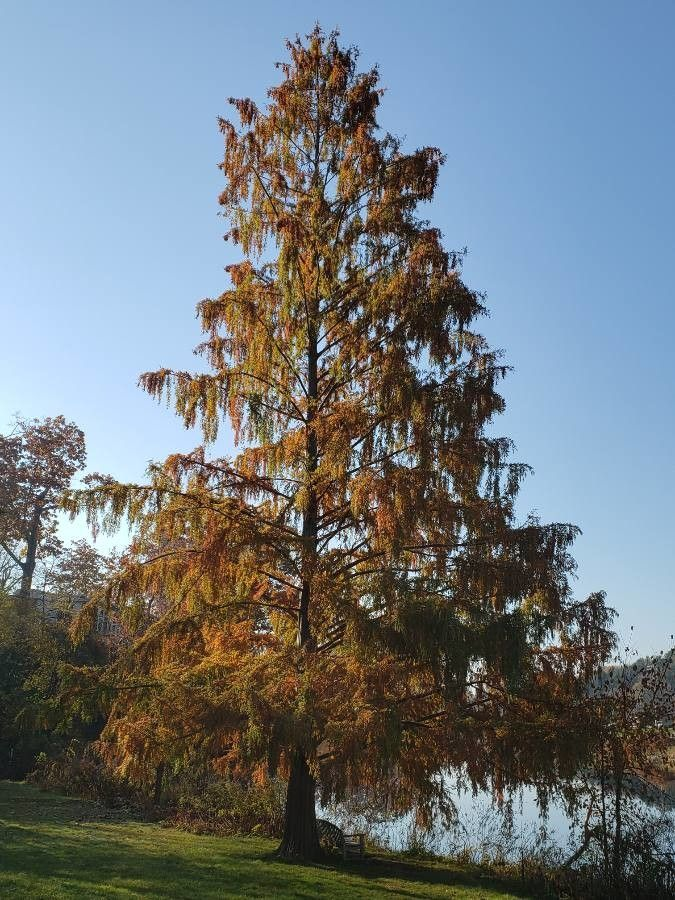
Taxodioid seed cones

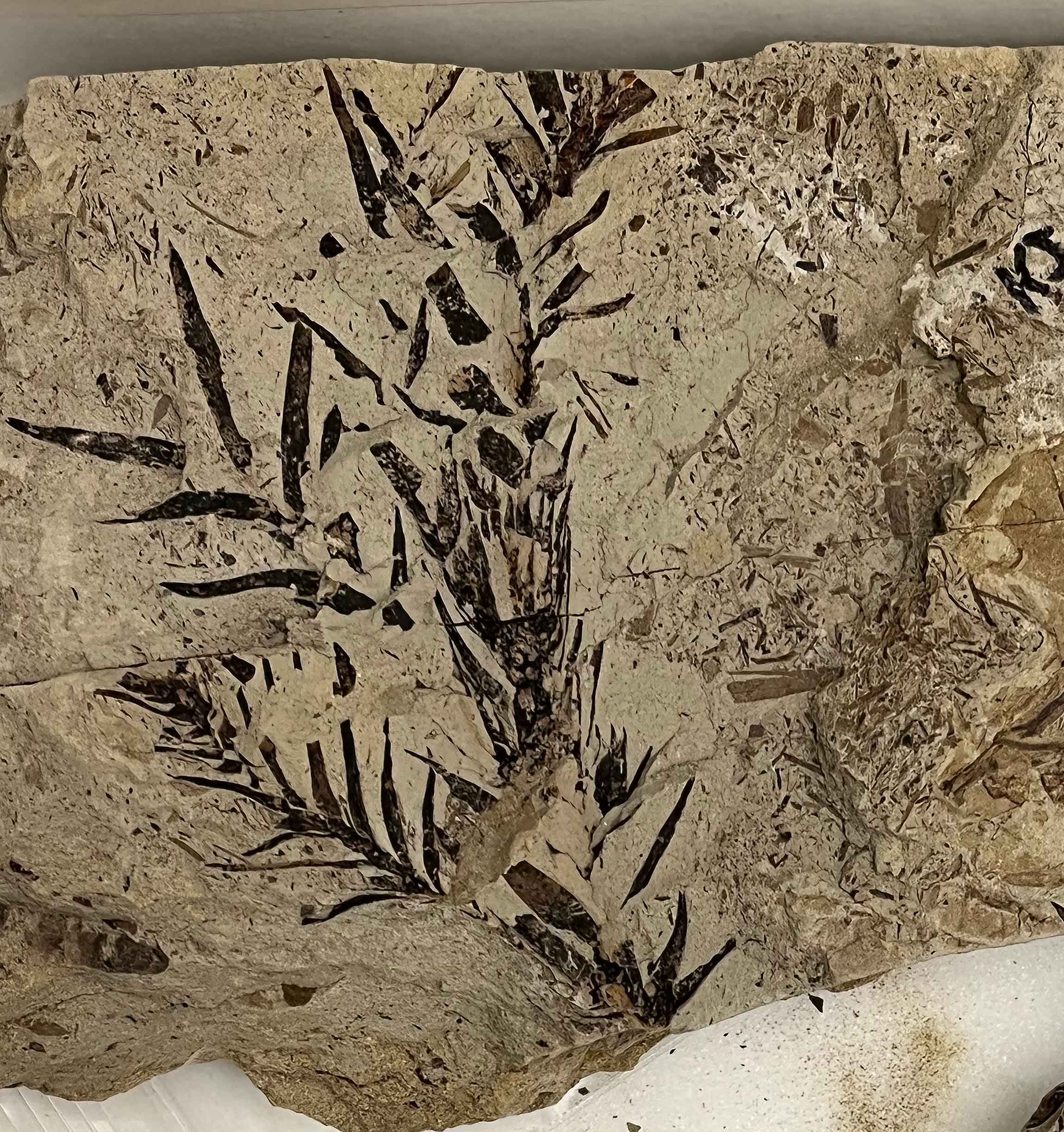
Araucarian leaves

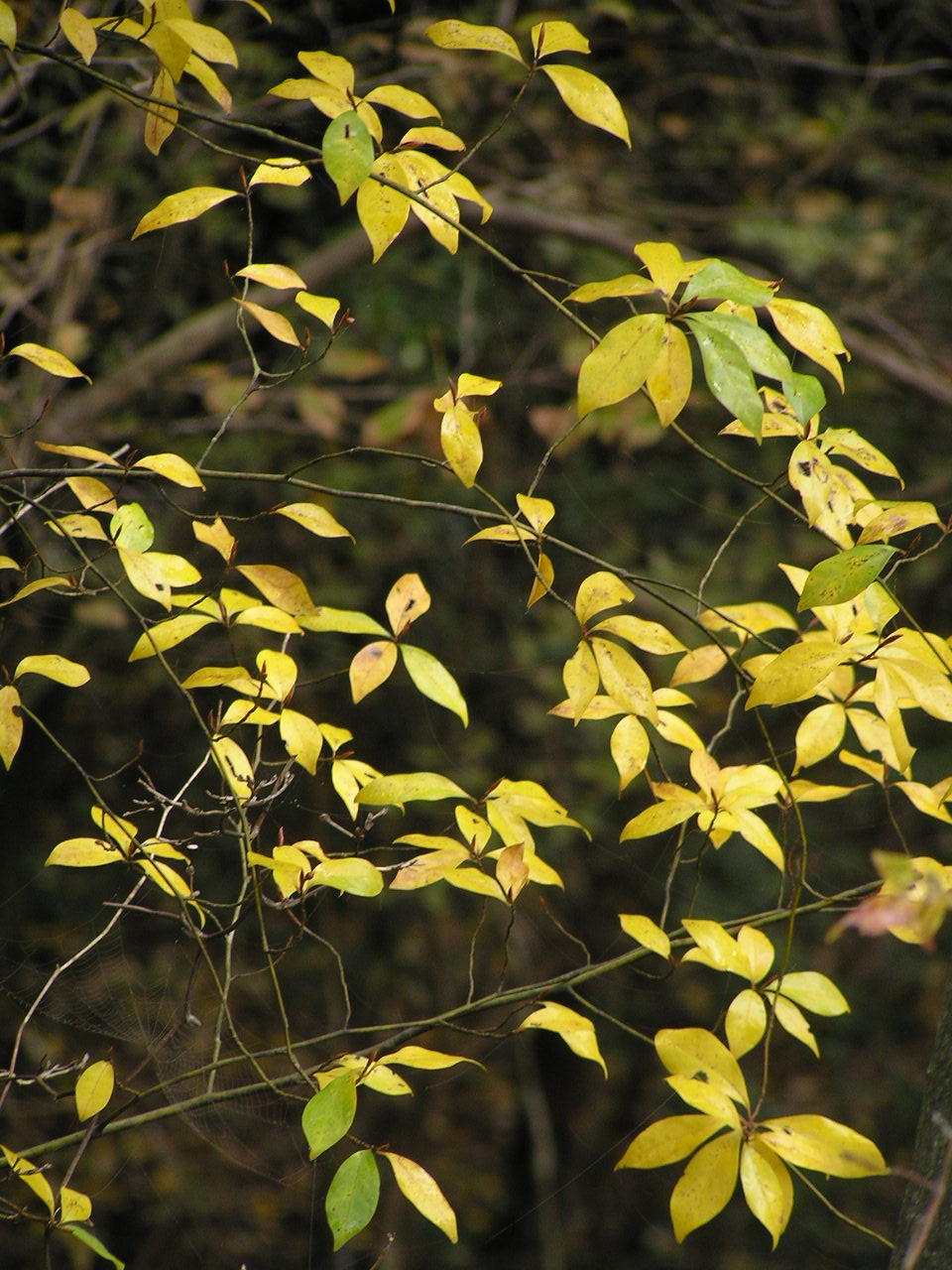
Lauraceae

Plants of the Hell Creek Formation

- various ferns and cycadeoids
- Equisetum (Equisetaceae)

Gymnosperms

- Platyspiroxylon (Cupressaceae)
- Podocarpoxylon (Podocarpaceae)
- Elatocladus (Coniferae)
- Sequoiaxylon (Taxodiaceae)
- Taxodioxylon (Taxodiaceae)
- Elatides (Araucariaceae)

Ginkgos

- Ginkgo adiantoides

Angiosperms

- Paranymphaea (Polygonaceae)
- Rose family (Rosaceae)
- Trochodendroides (Cercidiphyllaceae)
- Penosphyllum (Sterculiaceae)
- Laurel family (Lauraceae)
- Magnolia (Magnoliaceae)
- Sabalites (Arecaceae)
- Platanites, sycamore or plane tree (Platanaceae)

== See also ==
- List of fossil sites (with link directory)
- Lists of dinosaur-bearing stratigraphic units
- Morrison Formation
- Cretaceous–Paleogene formations
  - Denver Formation
  - Ferris Formation
  - Lefipán Formation, Argentina
  - López de Bertodano Formation, Antarctica
  - Tremp Formation, Spain
