= Absaroka sequence =

The Absaroka sequence was a cratonic sequence that extended from the end of the Mississippian through the Permian periods. There is an unconformity between the Absaroka and the lower Kaskaskia sequence. This unconformity divides the Carboniferous into the Mississippian and Pennsylvanian periods in North America.

Like the Kaskaskia sequence, Absaroka sedimentary deposits were dominated by detrital or siliclastic rocks. These are mostly sandstones, siltstones and shales. The first sediments were deposited near the continental margins, particularly near the Ouachita and Appalachian highlands. Characteristic of the strata from this time are cyclothems: alternating marine and non-marine strata indicative of changes in sea-level, probably due to cyclic glaciation in the Southern Hemisphere.

In North America, the waters of the Absaroka sequence regressed (thinned) westward as the highlands to the east steadily eroded. Restricted oceanic circulation in the west led to extensive evaporite formation. By the end of the period, the regression was complete, and the marine strata were superseded by extensive red bed deposition.

== Transgressive–regressive units ==
These cycles of sea level change have been divided into at least six magnitudes of order. Each order is a span of years that become smaller. The smallest unit is described as a punctuated aggradational cycle (PAC) and represents between 225,000 and 100,000 years of sediment accumulation. In the field, these units are usually one to five meters thick and contain several different rock units. These units show quick changes in sea level that were controlled by climate change due to glaciers.

The fifth order is often called a cyclothem and may contain several PAC sequences and generally represent about 500,000 years. Again, glaciation seems to be the cause of the cyclic nature of the strata.
