= Paleontology in North Dakota =

Paleontological research in the U.S. state of North Dakota

The location of the state of North Dakota

Paleontology in North Dakota refers to paleontological research occurring within or conducted by people from the U.S. state of North Dakota. During the early Paleozoic era most of North Dakota was covered by a sea home to brachiopods, corals, and fishes. The sea briefly left during the Silurian, but soon returned, until once more starting to withdraw during the Permian. By the Triassic some areas of the state were still under shallow seawater, but others were dry and hot. During the Jurassic subtropical forests covered the state. North Dakota was always at least partially under seawater during the Cretaceous. On land Sequoia grew. Later in the Cenozoic the local seas dried up and were replaced by subtropical swamps. Climate gradually cooled until the Ice Age, when glaciers entered the area and mammoths and mastodons roamed the local woodlands.

Local Native Americans interpreted fossils as the remains of the water monster Unktehi or burrowing serpents killed by the thunderbirds. The first scientifically documented local fossils were collected during the Lewis and Clark Expedition. Shipworm-bored petrified wood is the North Dakota state fossil.

== Prehistory ==
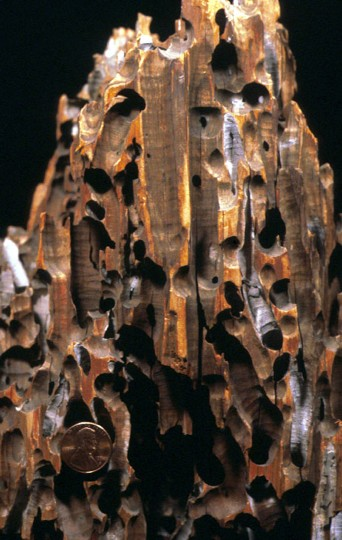
Teredolites borings in a modern wharf piling.

No Precambrian fossils are known from North Dakota, so the state's fossil record does not begin until the Paleozoic era. Large areas of North Dakota were under the sea during the early Paleozoic. During the Silurian the sea briefly withdrew from the state, although it was quickly re-inundated. Life in this sea included brachiopods, corals, fishes and molluscs. Sea levels continued to fluctuate throughout the remainder of the Paleozoic, and by the Permian period significant areas of the state were dry land. By the end of the Paleozoic the state was positioned near the equator.

During the Triassic much of the state was covered in shallow seawater, but the exposed terrestrial environments were very hot and dry. As the Triassic gave way to the Jurassic, North Dakota was becoming a series of plains covered in subtropical forests. Eventually these forests were also swallowed again by the sea. This sea was home to life like bivalves, echinoderms, foraminiferans, and gastropods. Throughout the Cretaceous North Dakota was either fully or partially submerged by sea water. The Niobrara Formation of the Pembina Escarpment and Valley City region records the presence of fish during the Cretaceous with fossils of their scales and bones. The Cretaceous Pierre Shale can likewise be found in the Pembina Escarpment and Valley City area as well as the banks of the Missouri and Little Missouri rivers. The Pierre Shale preserves later Cretaceous invertebrates like ammonites, clams, and snails. Contemporary fishes also left fossils of their scales. Mosasaurs lived in the Late Cretaceous seas of North Dakota. On land, dinosaurs were living along the coast of this sea. Later in the Cretaceous, local North Dakotan vertebrates left behind fossil bones and on rare occasions impressions were preserved of leaves from the local flora in the Hell Creek Formation. These were also preserved in the area now occupied by the banks of the Missouri and Little Missouri rivers. The Cretaceous Sequoia dakotensis left fossil cones in the area near Mandan. The same site preserved sections of petrified wood, some up to 50 lbs. Some of the petrified wood at this site bear the borings made by ancient ship worms. Dinosaurs included the armored Edmontonia, duck-billed Edmontosaurus, ostrich dinosaurs, pachycephalosaurs, Triceratops, and Tyrannosaurus.

During the ensuing Paleocene epoch, corals and snails were preserved by sediments now known as the Cannonball Formation, however, such fossils are very rare. Freshwater clams and snails have also been found in other contemporary deposits in the state. On land, trees would later leave behind wood to petrify. Leaves are also among the state's Paleocene fossils. Eocene plant fossils are known along the Knife River. Freshwater clams and snails are known in the areas north and east of the Missouri River. The Cannonball deposits near Minot are the last marine deposits to have been left in the North American interior. As the Cenozoic progressed, North Dakota's sea would give way to subtropical swamps. Rich North Dakotan forests included plants like cycads, dawn redwoods, ferns, figs, and palms. The local vegetation left behind great coals deposits in the rock record. Throughout the remainder of the Cenozoic, North Dakota's climate cooled and dried. The state's swamps vanished and their inhabitants became extinct. In their place woodlands formed. The climate got colder still and eventually glacial activity reshaped the state's landscape. At this time North Dakota was home to mammoths and mastodons.

== History ==
=== Indigenous interpretations ===
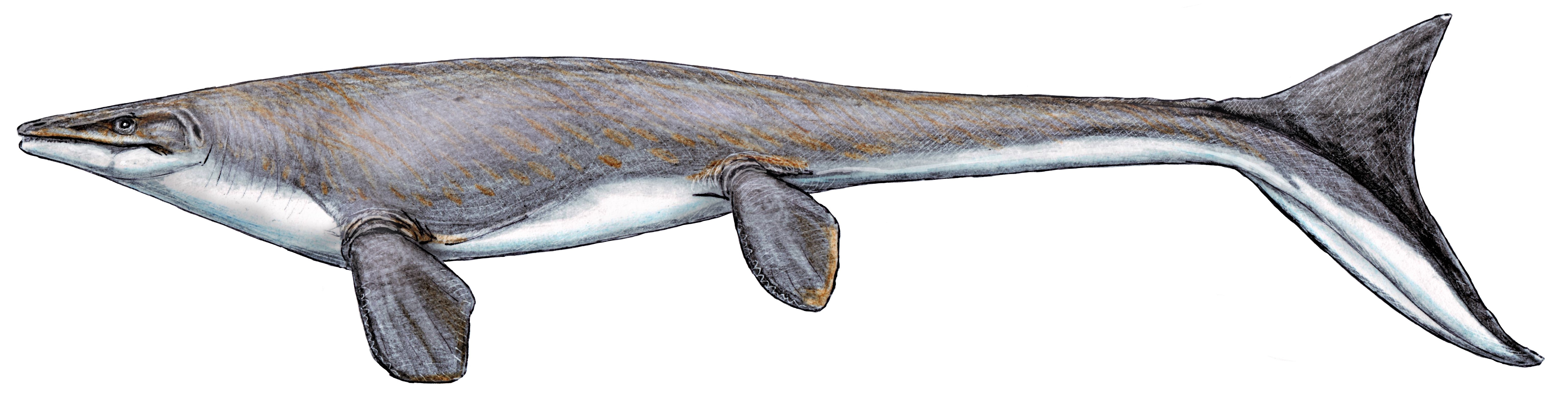
Mosasaur.

When the Sioux lived around the Great Lakes, they imagined their mythical Water Monster Unktehi as a large aquatic buffalo-like mammal. This image was likely derived from early observations of large Pleistocene mammal fossils like mammoths and mastodons eroding out of the banks of local lakes and rivers. As some groups of Sioux began moving west into the regions that includes North Dakota their depictions of Unktehi tended to converge on the characteristics of local fossils. Although Unktehi continued to be described as horned, it gradually became imagined as reptilian rather than the mammalian portrayals of the Sioux in the Great Lakes region, like the dinosaurs and mosasaurs of the region's Mesozoic rock. Unktehi was described as a snakelike monster equipped with feet, like the elongate sinuous mosasaurs who had four short limbs. Its back was described as ridged and saw like, a configuration similar to the appearance of a fossil vertebral column eroding from rock. In more recent times Lakota storyteller James LaPointe has explicitly called Unktehi a dinosaur.

The Sioux of the Standing Rock Reservation, which straddles the border between North and South Dakota, have a long history of familiarity with dinosaur bonebeds. They interpreted the bones as the remains of monstrous, evil serpents that tunneled underground. Lightning continuously sought to kill the serpents and successful kills became numbered with the abundant local fossils. The lightning had been so devastating to the area that it was responsible for the conversion of the region to badlands and the Sioux avoid physical contact with the fossils out of fear that doing so might make themselves more likely to be killed by lightning.

=== Scientific research ===
The first scientifically documented fossils in North Dakota were collected during the Lewis and Clark Expedition between 1804 and 1806 as they mapped the course of the Missouri River. The first fossil written about in the state were petrified wood preserved in sandstone concretions discovered at the Cannonball River. In 1833 a German named Alexander Philip Maximilian observed leaf impressions preserved in sandstone in the upper Missouri River area. He thought the plants were similar to modern phanerogammic plants still growing in the area. Maximilian collected a large number of them but in 1835 his fossils were destroyed near what is now Bismarck in a fire on the steam ship transporting them. In 1843 John James Audubon collected fossils like petrified wood and marine shells in the area but the specimens were of low quality.

In the mid-19th century the US government began intensely surveying the upper Missouri region. In the course of these surveys, a geologist with the Northern Pacific Railroad Survey named John Evans described the region between the Sioux River and the Falls of the Missouri as one of the best places in the world for collecting Cretaceous and Tertiary fossils.

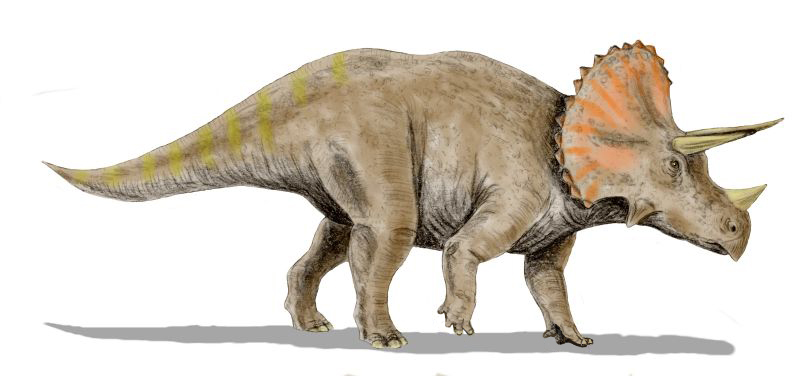
Triceratops.

Evans sent vertebrate fossils to Joseph Leidy, who discussed the remains in a pioneering and historically significant series of publications. Among the most prominent figures in early North Dakota paleontology were Dr. Ferdinand V. Hayden and Dr. Fielding Bradford Meek. New York geologist W. James Hall became interested in North Dakota paleontology as a result of Evans and Leidy's research. Hall sent Hayden and Meek into the area. The expedition was a great success, with Hayden and Meek "collected an enormous quantity of fossils." Hall and Meek formally described their non-mammalian discoveries, while Leidy described their mammals.

In 1883 Edward Drinker Cope made his first forays into North Dakota. Among his early accomplishments was the description of two new kinds of fish from the White River Formation. The site of Cope's discovery attracted so much attention that all of its fossils had been collected and the site was "completely mined out." In 1905 Earl Douglass wrote extensively on behalf of the Carnegie the fossils of the region near Cope's work. In the summer of 1963, Charles I. Frye discovered a specimen of Triceratops in the Hell Creek Formation of Slope County near the town of Marmarth. It was regarded as the best Triceratops skeleton ever found at the time. The excavation of the specimen was funded by many organizations at both the national and state levels. Among the excavators were Dr. Holland, Jack W. Crawford, and Michael F. Archbold from the Department of Geology at the University of North Dakota at Grand Forks. Marshall Lambert of Ekalaka, Montana was another participant. Between 1963 and 1966 several significant Pleistocene mammal skulls were discovered in North Dakota and were described for the scientific literature.

== People ==
Charles Lewis Camp was born in Jamestown on 12 March, 1893.

== Natural history museums ==
- North Dakota Heritage Center
- Dakota Dinosaur Museum, Dickinson

== See also ==
- Paleontology in Minnesota
- Paleontology in Montana
- Paleontology in South Dakota
- Geology of North Dakota
