= Argon compounds =

Class of chemical compounds

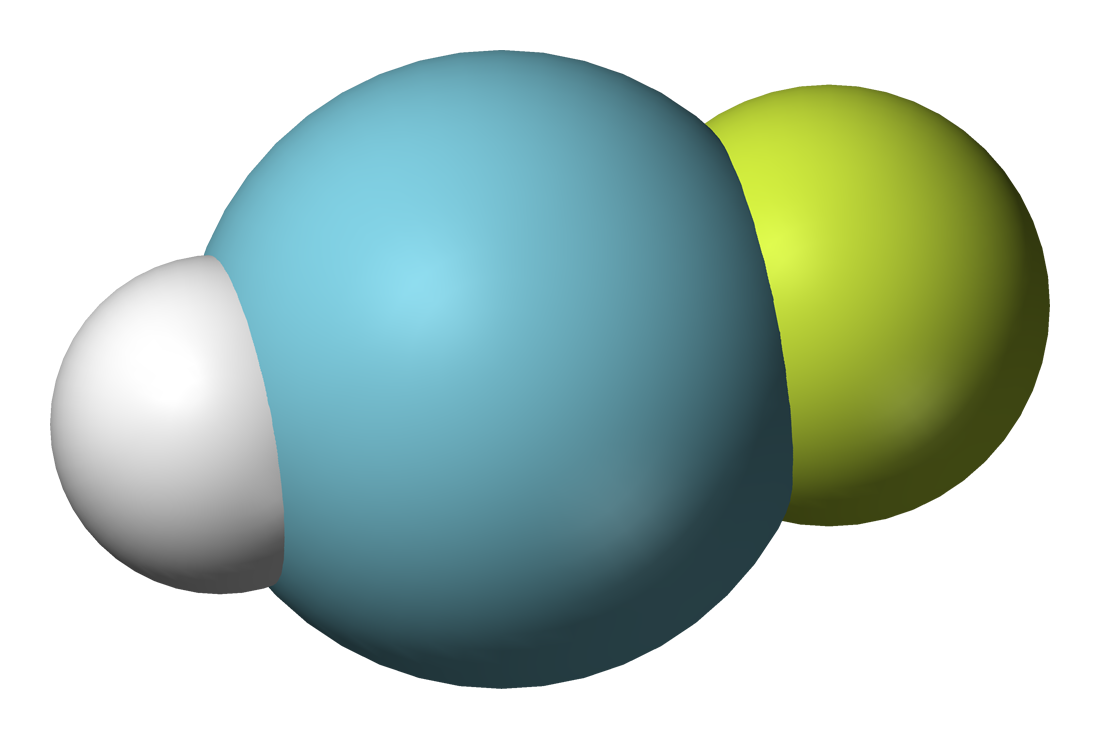
A space-filling model of argon fluorohydride, a compound of argon

Argon compounds, the chemical compounds that contain the element argon, are rarely encountered due to the inertness of the argon atom. However, compounds of argon have been detected in inert gas matrix isolation, cold gases, and plasmas, and molecular ions containing argon have been made and also detected in space. One solid interstitial compound of argon, Ar_{1}C_{60} is stable at room temperature. Ar_{1}C_{60} was discovered by the CSIRO.

Argon ionises at 15.76 eV (1520 kJ mol^{-1}), which is higher than hydrogen, but lower than helium, neon or fluorine. Molecules containing argon can be van der Waals molecules held together very weakly by London dispersion forces. Ionic molecules can be bound by charge induced dipole interactions. With gold atoms there can be some covalent interaction. Several boron-argon bonds with significant covalent interactions have been also reported. Experimental methods used to study argon compounds have included inert gas matrices, infrared spectroscopy to study stretching and bending movements, microwave spectroscopy and far infrared to study rotation, and also visible and ultraviolet spectroscopy to study different electronic configurations including excimers. Mass spectroscopy is used to study ions. Computation methods have been used to theoretically compute molecule parameters, and predict new stable molecules. Computational ab initio methods used have included CCSD(T), MP2 (Møller–Plesset perturbation theory of the second order), CIS and CISD. For heavy atoms, effective core potentials are used to model the inner electrons, so that their contributions do not have to be individually computed. More powerful computers since the 1990s have made this kind of in silico study much more popular, being much less risky and simpler than an actual experiment. This article is mostly based on experimental or observational results.

The argon fluoride laser is important in photolithography of silicon chips. These lasers make a strong ultraviolet emission at 193 nm.

== Argonium ==
Argonium (ArH^{+}) is an ion combining a proton and an argon atom. It is found in interstellar space in diffuse atomic hydrogen gas where the fraction of molecular hydrogen, H_{2}, is in the range of 0.0001 to 0.001.

Argonium is formed when H_{2}^{+} reacts with Ar atoms:

Ar + H_{2}^{+} → ArH^{+} + H

and it is also produced from Ar^{+} ions produced by cosmic rays and X-rays from neutral argon:

Ar^{+} + H_{2} → *ArH^{+} + H 1.49 eV (144 kJ mol^{-1}).

When ArH^{+} encounters an electron, dissociative recombination can occur, but it is extremely slow for lower energy electrons, allowing ArH^{+} to survive for a much longer time than many other similar protonated cations.

ArH^{+} + e^{−} → ArH* → Ar + H

Artificial ArH^{+} made from earthly Ar contains mostly the isotope ^{40}Ar rather than the cosmically abundant ^{36}Ar. Artificially it is made by an electric discharge through an argon-hydrogen mixture.

=== Natural occurrence ===
In the Crab Nebula, ArH^{+} occurs in several spots revealed by emission lines. The strongest place is in the Southern Filament. This is also the place with the strongest concentration of Ar^{+} and Ar^{2+} ions. The column density of ArH^{+} in the Crab Nebula is between 10^{12} and 10^{13} atoms per square centimeter. Possibly the energy required to excite the ions so that then can emit, comes from collisions with electrons or hydrogen molecules. Towards the Milky Way centre the column density of ArH^{+} is around 2×10^{13} cm^{−2}.

== Cluster argon cations ==
The diargon cation, Ar_{2}^{+} has a binding energy of 1.29 eV (124 kJ mol^{-1}).

The triargon cation Ar_{3}^{+} is linear, but has one Ar−Ar bond shorter than the other. Bond lengths are 2.47 and 2.73 ångströms. The dissociation energy to Ar and Ar_{2}^{+} is 0.2 eV. In line with the molecule's asymmetry, the charge is calculated as +0.10, +0.58 and +0.32 on each argon atom, so that it greatly resembles Ar_{2}^{+} bound to a neutral Ar atom.

Larger charged argon clusters are also detectable in mass spectroscopy. The tetraargon cation is also linear. Ar_{13}^{+} icosahedral clusters have an Ar_{3}^{+} core, whereas Ar_{19}^{+} is dioctahedral with an Ar_{4}^{+} core. The linear Ar_{4}^{+} core has +0.1 charge on the outer atoms, and +0.4 charge on each or the inner atoms. For larger charged argon clusters, the charge is not distributed on more than four atoms. Instead the neutral outer atoms are attracted by induced electric polarization. The charged argon clusters absorb radiation, from the near infrared, through visible to ultraviolet. The charge core, Ar_{2}^{+}, Ar_{3}^{+} or Ar_{4}^{+} is called a chromophore. Its spectrum is modified by the first shell of neutral atoms attached. Larger clusters have the same spectrum as the smaller ones. When photons are absorbed in the chromophore, it is initially electronically excited, but then energy is transferred to the whole cluster in the form of vibration. Excess energy is removed by outer atoms evaporating from the cluster one at a time. The process of destroying a cluster by light is called photofragmentation.

Negatively-charged argon clusters are thermodynamically unstable, and therefore cannot exist. Argon has a negative electron affinity.

== Argon monohydride ==
Neutral argon hydride, also known as argon monohydride (ArH), was the first discovered noble gas hydride. J. W. C. Johns discovered an emission line of ArH at 767 nm and announced the find in 1970. The molecule was synthesized using X-ray irradiation of mixtures of argon with hydrogen-rich molecules such as H_{2}, H_{2}O, CH_{4} and CH_{3}OH. The X-ray excited argon atoms are in the 4p state.

Argon monohydride is unstable in its ground state, 4s, as a neutral inert gas atom and a hydrogen atom repel each other at normal intermolecular distances. When a higher-energy-level ArH* emits a photon and reaches the ground state, the atoms are too close to each other, and they repel and break up. However a van der Waals molecule can exist with a long bond. However, excited ArH* can form stable Rydberg molecules, also known as excimers. These Rydberg molecules can be considered as a protonated argon core, surrounded by an electron in one of many possible higher energy states.

Formation: Ar + γ → Ar*; Ar* + H_{2} → ArH* + H

Instead of dihydrogen, other hydrogen containing molecules can also have a hydrogen atom abstracted by excited argon, but note that some molecules bind hydrogen too strongly for the reaction to proceed. For example, acetylene will not form ArH this way.

In the van der Waals molecule of ArH, the bond length is calculated to be about 3.6 Å (360 pm) and the dissociation energy calculated to be 0.404 kJ/mol (33.8 cm^{−1}). The bond length in ArH* is calculated as 1.302 Å.

The spectrum of argon monohydride, both ArH* and ArD*, has been studied. The lowest bound state is termed A^{2}Σ^{+} or 5s. Another low lying state is known as 4p, made up of C^{2}Σ^{+} and B^{2}π states. Each transition to or from higher level states corresponds to a band. Known bands are 3p → 5s, 4p → 5s, 5p → 5s (band origin 17486.527 cm^{−1}), 6p → 5s (band origin 21676.90 cm^{−1}) 3dσ → 4p, 3dπ → 4p (6900 cm^{−1}), 3dδ → 4p (8200–8800 cm^{−1}), 4dσ → 4p (15075 cm^{−1}), 6s → 4p (7400–7950 cm^{−1}), 7s → 4p (predicted at 13970 cm^{−1}, but obscured), 8s → 4p (16750 cm^{−1}), 5dπ → 4p (16460 cm^{−1}), 5p → 6s (band origin 3681.171 cm^{−1}), 4f → 5s (20682.17 and 20640.90 cm^{−1} band origin for ArD and ArH), 4f → 3dπ (7548.76 and 7626.58 ccm^{−1}), 4f → 3dδ (6038.47 and 6026.57 cm^{−1}), 4f → 3dσ (4351.44 cm^{−1} for ArD). The transitions going to 5s, 3dπ → 5s and 5dπ → 5s, are strongly predissociated, blurring out the lines. In the UV spectrum a continuous band exists from 200 to 400 nm. This band is due to two different higher states: B^{2}Π → A^{2}Σ^{+} radiates over 210–450 nm, and E^{2}Π → A^{2}Σ^{+} is between 180 and 320 nm. A band in the near infrared from 760 to 780 nm.

Other ways to make ArH include a Penning-type discharge tube, or other electric discharges. Yet another way is to create a beam of ArH^{+} (argonium) ions and then neutralize them in laser-energized caesium vapour. By using a beam, the lifetimes of the different energy states can be observed, by measuring the profile of electromagnetic energy emitted at different wavelengths. The E^{2}π state of ArH has a radiative lifetime of 40 ns. For ArD the lifetime is 61 ns. The B^{2}Π state has a lifetime of 16.6 ns in ArH and 17 ns in ArD.

== Argon polyhydrides ==
The argon dihydrogen cation ArH_{2}^{+} has been predicted to exist and to be detectable in the interstellar medium. However it has not been detected as of 2021. ArH_{2}^{+} is predicted to be linear in the form Ar−H−H. The H−H distance is 0.94 Å (94 pm). The dissociation barrier is only 1.9 kcal (8 kJ) mol^{-1}, and ArH_{2}^{+} readily loses a hydrogen atom to yield ArH^{+}. The force constant of the ArH bond in this is 1.895 mdyne/Å^{2} (1.895×10^{12} Pa).

The argon trihydrogen cation ArH_{3}^{+} has been observed in the laboratory. ArH_{2}D^{+}, ArHD_{2}^{+} and ArD_{3}^{+} have also been observed. The argon trihydrogen cation is planar in shape, with an argon atom off the vertex of a triangle of hydrogen atoms.

== Argoxonium ==
The argoxonium ion ArOH^{+} is predicted to be bent molecular geometry in the 1^{1}A′ state. ^{3}Σ^{−} is a triplet state 0.12 eV higher in energy, and ^{3}A″ is a triplet state 0.18 eV higher. The Ar−O bond is predicted to be 1.684 Å long and to have a force constant of 2.988 mdyne/Å^{2} (2.988×10^{12} Pa). Such an argoxonium ion has also been empirically observed through the reaction of argon with interfacial water in microdroplets.

== ArNH^{+} ==
ArNH^{+} is a possible ionic molecule to detect in the lab, and in space, as the atoms that compose it are common. ArNH^{+} is predicted to be more weakly bound than ArOH^{+}, with a force constant in the Ar−N bond of 1.866 mdyne/Å^{2} (1866 GPa). The angle at the nitrogen atom is predicted to be 97.116°. The Ar−N lengths should be 1.836 Å and the N−H bond length would be 1.046 Å

== Argon dinitrogen cation ==
The argon dinitrogen linear cationic complex has also been detected in the lab:

Ar + N_{2}^{+} → ArN_{2}^{+} Ar^{+} + N_{2}.

The dissociation yields Ar^{+}, as this is a higher-energy state. The binding energy is 1.19 eV (115 kJ mol^{-1}). The molecule is linear. The distance between two nitrogen atoms is 1.1 Å (110 pm). This distance is similar to that of neutral N_{2} rather than that of N_{2}^{+} ion. The distance between one nitrogen and the argon atom is 2.2 Å. The vibrational band origin for the nitrogen bond in ArN_{2}^{+} (V = 0 → 1) is at 2272.2564 cm^{−1} compared with N_{2}^{+} at 2175 and N_{2} at 2330 cm^{−1}.

In the process of photodissociation, it is three times more likely to yield Ar^{+} + N_{2} compared to Ar + N_{2}^{+}.

== ArHN_{2}^{+} ==
ArHN_{2}^{+} has been produced in a supersonic jet expansion of gas and detected by Fourier transform microwave spectroscopy. The molecule is linear, with the atoms in the order Ar−H−N−N. The Ar−H distance is 1.864 Å. There is a stronger bond between hydrogen and argon than in ArHCO^{+}.

The molecule is made by the following reaction:

ArH^{+} + N_{2} → ArHN_{2}^{+}.

== Bis(dinitrogen) argon cation ==
The argon ion can bond two molecules of dinitrogen (N_{2}) to yield an ionic complex with a linear shape and structure N=N−−N=N. The N=N bond length is 1.1014 Å, and the nitrogen to argon bond length is 2.3602 Å. 1.7 eV (164 kJ mol^{-1}) of energy is required to break this apart to N_{2} and ArN_{2}^{+}. The band origin of an infrared band due to antisymmetric vibration of the N=N bonds is at 2288.7272 cm^{−1} (27.379257 kJ mol^{-1}). Compared to N_{2} it is redshifted 41.99 cm^{−1}. The ground state rotational constant of the molecule is 0.034296 cm^{−1}.

Ar(N_{2})_{2}^{+} is produced by a supersonic expansion of a 10:1 mixture of argon with nitrogen through a nozzle, which is impacted by an electron beam.

== ArN_{2}O^{+} ==
ArN_{2}O^{+} absorbs photons in four violet–ultraviolet wavelength bands leading to breakup of the molecule. The bands are 445–420, 415–390, 390–370, and 342 nm.

== ArHCO^{+} ==
ArHCO^{+} has been produced in a supersonic-jet expansion of gas and detected by Fabry–Perot-type Fourier transform microwave spectroscopy.

The molecule is made by this reaction

ArH^{+} + CO → ArHCO^{+}.

== Ar_{n}BO^{+} ==
BO^{+} forms four complexes with argon: ArBO^{+}; two isomers of Ar_{2}BO^{+} (one with equidistant Ar-B bonds and another with a short and long bond); and Ar_{3}BO^{+}. These ions were formed by firing a green laser at a boron target in a gaseous mixture of helium, argon and nitrous oxide.

== Carbon dioxide–argon ion ==
ArCO_{2}^{+} can be excited to form ArCO_{2}^{+}* where the positive charge is moved from the carbon dioxide part to the argon. This molecule may occur in the upper atmosphere. Experimentally the molecule is made from a low-pressure argon gas with 0.1% carbon dioxide, irradiated by a 150 V electron beam. Argon is ionized, and can transfer the charge to a carbon dioxide molecule. The dissociation energy of ArCO_{2}^{+} is 0.26 eV.

ArCO_{2}^{+} + CO_{2} → Ar + CO_{2}·CO_{2}^{+} (yields 0.435 eV, 42.0 kJ mol^{-1}.)

== Van der Waals molecules ==
Neutral argon atoms bind very weakly to other neutral atoms or molecules to form van der Waals molecules. These can be made by expanding argon under high pressure mixed with the atoms of another element. The expansion happens through a tiny hole into a vacuum, and results in cooling to temperatures a few degrees above absolute zero. At higher temperatures the atoms will be too energetic to stay together by way of the weak London dispersion forces. The atoms that are to combine with argon can be produced by evaporation with a laser or alternatively by an electric discharge. The known molecules include AgAr, Ag_{2}Ar, NaAr, KAr, MgAr, CaAr, SrAr, ZnAr, CdAr, HgAr, SiAr, InAr, CAr, GeAr, SnAr, and BAr. SiAr was made from silicon atoms derived from Si(CH_{3})_{4}.

In addition to the very weakly bound van der Waals molecules, electronically excited molecules with the same formula exist. As a formula these can be written ArX*, with the "*" indicating an excited state. The atoms are much more strongly bound with a covalent bond. They can be modeled as an ArX^{+} surrounded by a higher energy shell with one electron. This outer electron can change energy by exchanging photons and so can fluoresce. The widely used argon fluoride laser makes use of the ArF* excimer to produce strong ultraviolet radiation at 192 nm. The argon chloride laser using ArCl* produces even shorter ultraviolet at 175 nm, but is too feeble for application. The argon chloride in this laser comes from argon and chlorine molecules.

=== Argon clusters ===
Cooled argon gas can form clusters of atoms. Diargon, also known as the argon dimer, has a binding energy of 0.012 eV (1.16 kJ mol^{-1}), but the Ar_{13} and Ar_{19} clusters have a sublimation energy (per atom) of 0.06 eV. For liquid argon, which could be written as Ar_{∞}, the energy increases to 0.08 eV. Clusters of up to several hundred argon atoms have been detected. These argon clusters are icosahedral in shape, consisting of shells of atoms arranged around a central atom. The structure changes for clusters with more than 800 atoms to resemble a tiny crystal with a face-centered cubic (fcc) structure, as in solid argon. It is the surface energy that maintains an icosahedral shape, but for larger clusters internal pressure will attract the atoms into an fcc arrangement. Neutral argon clusters are transparent to visible light.

=== Diatomic van der Waals molecules ===
Molecule	Binding energy ground Σ state (cm^{−1})	Binding energy excited Π state (cm^{−1})	Ground state bond length (Å)	Excited state bond length (Å)	CAS number
ArH					30736-04-0
ArHe					12254-69-2
LiAr	42.5	925	4.89	2.48	
BAr					149358-32-7
ArNe					12301-65-4
NaAr	40	560			56633-38-6
MgAr	44	246			72052-59-6
AlAr					143752-09-4
SiAr					
ArCl					54635-29-9
Ar_{2}					12595-59-4
KAr	42	373			12446-47-8
CaAr	62	134			72052-60-9
SrAr	68	136			
NiAr					401838-48-0
ZnAr	96	706			72052-61-0
GaAr					149690-22-2
GeAr					
KrAr					51184-77-1
AgAr	90	1200			
CdAr	106	544			72052-62-1
InAr					146021-90-1
SnAr					
ArXe					58206-67-0
AuAr					195245-92-2
HgAr	131	446			87193-95-1

ArO* is also formed when dioxygen trapped in an argon matrix is subjected to vacuum ultraviolet. It can be detected by its luminescence:

O_{2} + hv → O_{2}^{+} + e^{−}; O_{2}^{+} + e^{−} → 2 O*; O* + Ar → ArO*.

Light emitted by ArO* has two main bands, one at 2.215 eV (559.7 nm), and a weaker one at 2.195 eV (564.8 nm).

Argon sulfide, ArS* luminesces in the near infrared at 1.62 eV (765 nm). ArS is made from UV irradiated OCS in an argon matrix. The excited states lasts for 7.4 and 3.5 μs for spectrum peak and band respectively.

=== Triatomic van der Waals molecules ===
Cluster molecules containing dichlorine and more than one argon atom can be made by forcing a 95:5 mixture of helium and argon and a trace of chlorine though a nozzle. ArCl_{2} exists in a T shape. Ar_{2}Cl_{2} has a distorted tetrahedron shape, with the two argon atoms 4.1 Å (410 pm) from each other, and their axis 3.9 Å from the Cl_{2}. The van der Waals bond energy is 447 cm^{−1} (5.35 kJ mol^{-1}). Ar_{3}Cl_{2} also exists with a van der Waals bond energy of 776 cm^{−1} (9.28 kJ mol^{-1}).

The linear Ar·Br_{2} molecule has a continuous spectrum for bromine molecule X → B transitions. The spectrum of bromine is blue-shifted and spread out when it binds an argon atom.

ArI_{2} shows a spectrum that adds satellite bands to the higher vibrational bands of I_{2}. The ArI_{2} molecule has two different isomers, one shape is linear, and the other is T-shaped. The dynamics of ArI_{2} is complex. Breakup occurs through different routes in the two isomers. The T shape undergoes intramolecular vibrational relaxation, whereas the linear one directly breaks apart. Diiodine clusters, I_{2}Ar_{n} have been made.

The ArClF cluster has a linear shape. The argon atom is closest to the chlorine atom.

Linear ArBrCl can also rearrange to ArClBr, or a T-shaped isomer.

Multiple argon atoms can "solvate" a water molecule forming a monolayer around the H_{2}O. Ar_{12}·H_{2}O is particularly stable, having an icosahedral shape. Molecules from Ar·H_{2}O to Ar_{14}·H_{2}O have been studied.

ArBH was produced from boron monohydride (BH) which in turn was created from diborane by way of an ultraviolet 193 nm laser. The BH-argon mixture was expanded through a 0.2 mm diameter nozzle into a vacuum. The gas mixture cools and Ar and BH combine to yield ArBH. A band spectrum that combines the A^{1}Π←X^{1}Σ^{+} electronic transition, with vibration and rotation can be observed. The BH has singlet spin, and this is the first known van der Waals complex with a singlet spin pair of atoms. For this molecule the rotational constant is 0.133 cm^{−1}, The dissociation energy is 92 cm^{−1} (1.1 kJ mol^{-1}) and distance from argon to boron atom is 3.70 Å (370 pm). ArAlH is also known to exist.

MgAr_{2} is also known.

=== Polyatomic van der Waals molecules ===
Some linear polyatomic molecules can form T-shaped van der Waals complexes with argon. These include NCCN, carbon dioxide, nitrous oxide, acetylene, carbon oxysulfide, and ClCN. Others attach the argon atom at one end to continue to be linear, including HCN.

Other polyatomic van der Waals compounds of argon, include those of fluorobenzene, formyl radical (ArHCO), 7-azaindole, glyoxal, sodium chloride (ArNaCl), ArHCl, and cyclopentanone.

Molecule	Name	Ground state binding energy (cm^{−1})	Closest position or atom to argon	Ground state bond length of Ar (Å)	Bond angle from atom (degrees)	Bond stretch force or frequency	dipole moment D	CAS number	references
(CH_{3})_{2}F_{2}Si·Ar	Difluorodimethylsilane – argon								
CH_{2}F_{2}·Ar	Difluoromethane – argon		F	3.485	58.6				
CF_{3}CN	trifluoromethylcyanide argon		C1	3.73	77			947504-98-5	
CF_{2}HCH_{3}·Ar	1,1-difluoroethane argon		F					–	
CH_{2}FCH_{2}F·Ar	1,2-difluoroethane argon	181	F	3.576	61			264131-14-8	
CH_{3}CHO·Ar	Acetaldehyde argon	161	C-1	3.567	76.34			158885-13-3	
C_{2}H_{4}O·Ar	oxirane argon	200	O	3.606 (CM)	72.34				
ArBF_{3}	Boron trifluoride argon		B	3.325	on axis ArBF ≈90.5°	0.030 mdyn/Å	0.176		
ArC_{6}H_{6}	benzene-argon		on sixfold axis	3.53 from plane			0.12		
ArPF_{3}	argon phosphorus trifluoride complex		P	3.953 from centre of mass	70.3° on PF_{2} face				
Ar-NCCN	argon–cyanogen van der Waals complex		centre of molecule	3.58	90° T shape	30 cm^{−1}	0.0979		
DCCDAr	argon-deuterated acetylene		centre of molecule	3.25	90° T shape	0.0008 mdyn/Å / 8.7 cm^{−1}			
SO_{3}Ar	sulfur trioxide argon		S	3.350	on axis 90° from SO bond	0.059 mdyn/Å / 61 cm^{−1}			
Ar•HCCH	acetylene argon				T shape				
OCS•Ar									
CH_{3}OH·Ar									
CH_{3}Cl·Ar									
	Pyridine argon								
	Pyrrole argon								

== Aqueous argon ==
Argon dissolved in water causes the pH to rise to 8.0, apparently by reducing the number of oxygen atoms available to bind protons.

With ice, argon forms a clathrate hydrate. Up to 0.6 GPa, the clathrate has a cubic structure. Between 0.7 and 1.1 GPa the clathrate has a tetragonal structure. Between 1.1 and 6.0 GPa the structure is body centered orthorhombic. Over 6.1 GPa, the clathrate converts into solid argon and ice VII. At atmospheric pressure the clathrate is stable below 147 K (−126 °C). At 295 K (22 °C) the argon pressure from the clathrate is 108 MPa (1,070 atm).

== Argon fluorohydride ==
Argon fluorohydride was an important discovery in the rejuvenation of the study of noble gas chemistry. HArF is stable in solid form at temperatures below 17 K. It is prepared by photolysis of hydrogen fluoride in a solid argon matrix. HArArF would have such a low barrier to decomposition that it will likely never be observed. However HBeArF is predicted to be more stable than HArF.

== Uranium compounds ==
CUO in a solid argon matrix can bind one, or a few argon atoms to yield CUO·Ar, CUO·Ar_{3} or CUO·Ar_{4}. CUO itself is made by evaporating uranium atoms into carbon monoxide. Uranium acts as a strong Lewis acid in CUO and forms bonds with energies of about 3.2 kcal (13.4 kJ) mol^{-1} with argon. The argon acts as a Lewis base. Its electron density is inserted into an empty 6d orbital on the uranium atom. The spectrum of CUO is changed by argon so that the U−O stretch frequency changes from 872.2 to 804.3 cm^{−1} and the U−C stretch frequency from 1047.3 to 852.5 cm^{−1}. The significant change in the spectrum occurs because the CUO is changed from a singlet state (in gas phase or solid neon) to a triplet state, with argon or noble gas complexing. The argon–uranium bond length is 3.16 Å. This is shorter than the sum of atomic radii of U and Ar of 3.25 Å, but considerably longer than a normal covalent bond to uranium. For example, U−Cl in UCl_{6} is 2.49 Å. When xenon is included in the solid argon matrix up to a few percent, additional van der Waals molecules are formed: CUO·Ar_{3}Xe, CUO·Ar_{2}Xe_{2}, CUO·ArXe_{3} and CUO·Xe_{4}. Similarly krypton can substitute for argon in CUO·Ar_{3}Kr, CUO·Ar_{2}Kr_{2}, CUO·ArKr_{3} and CUO·Kr_{4}. The shape of these molecules is roughly octahedral, with a uranium centre and with the noble gas atoms around the equator.

UO_{2}^{+} can bind up to five noble gas atoms in a ring around a linear O==O core. These molecules are produced when uranium metal is laser ablated into dioxygen. This produces UO, UO_{2}, UO_{3}, U^{+}, and importantly UO_{2}^{+}. UO_{2}^{+} is then condensed into a noble gas matrix, either a pure element or a mixture. Heavier noble gas atoms will tend to displace the lighter atoms. Ionic molecules produced this way include UO_{2}Ne_{4}Ar^{+}, UO_{2}Ne_{3}Ar_{2}^{+}, UO_{2}Ne_{2}Ar_{3}^{+}, UO_{2}NeAr_{4}^{+}, UO_{2}Ar_{5}^{+}, UO_{2}Ar_{4}Kr^{+}, UO_{2}Ar_{3}Kr_{2}^{+}, UO_{2}Ar_{2}Kr_{3}^{+}, UO_{2}ArKr_{4}^{+}, UO_{2}Ar_{4}Xe^{+}, UO_{2}Ar_{3}Xe_{2}^{+}, UO_{2}Ar_{2}Xe_{3}^{+}, and UO_{2}ArXe_{4}^{+}, which are identified by a shift in the U=O antisymmetric stretching frequency.

Neutral UO_{2} condensed in solid argon is converted from one electronic state to another by the argon atom ligands. In argon the electron configuration is 5f^{2}(δφ) whereas in neon it is 5f^{1}7s^{1} (the state ^{3}H_{4g} compared to ^{3}Φ_{2u}). This is because the argon atoms have a larger antibonding interaction with the 7s^{1} electron, forcing it into a different subshell. The argonated compound has a stretching frequency of 776 cm^{−1} compared to 914.8 cm^{−1} in neon. The argon uranium dioxide molecule is likely UO_{2}Ar_{5}.

== Beryllium oxide ==
When beryllium atoms react with oxygen in a solid argon matrix (or beryllia is evaporated into the matrix) ArBeO is formed, and is observable by its infrared spectrum. The beryllia molecule is strongly polarised, and the argon atom is attracted to the beryllium atom. The bond strength of Ar−Be is calculated to be 6.7 kcal (28 kJ) mol^{-1}. The Ar−Be bond length is predicted to be 2.042 Å.

The cyclic Be_{2}O_{2} molecule can bind two argon atoms, or one argon along with another noble gas atom.

Analogously, beryllium reacting with hydrogen sulfide and trapped in an argon matrix at 4 K forms ArBeS. It has a binding energy calculated to be 12.8 kcal (54 kJ) mol^{-1}.

ArBeO_{2}CO (beryllium carbonate) has been prepared (along with Ne, Kr and Xe adducts).

The cyclic beryllium sulfite molecule can also coordinate an argon atom onto the beryllium atom in solid neon or argon matrix.

== Carbonyl compounds ==
Group 6 elements can form reactive pentacarbonyls that can react with argon. These were actually argon compounds discovered in 1975, and were known before the discovery of HArF, but are usually overlooked. Tungsten normally forms a hexacarbonyl, but when subject to ultraviolet radiation it breaks into a reactive pentacarbonyl. When this is condensed into a noble gas matrix the infrared and UV spectrum varies considerably depending on the noble gas used. This is because the noble gas present binds to the vacant position on the tungsten atom. Similar results also occur with molybdenum and chromium. Argon is only very weakly bound to tungsten in ArW(CO)_{5}. The Ar−W bondlength is predicted to be 2.852 Å. The same substance is produced for a brief time in supercritical argon at 21 °C. For ArCr(CO)_{5} the band maximum is at 533 nm (compared to 624 nm in neon, and 518 nm in krypton). Forming 18-electron complexes, the shift in spectrum due to different matrices was much smaller, only around 5 nm. This clearly indicates the formation of a molecule using atoms from the matrix.

Other carbonyls and complexed carbonyls also have reports of bonding to argon. These include Ru(CO)_{2}(PMe_{3})_{2}Ar, Ru(CO)_{2}(dmpe)_{2}Ar, η^{6}-C_{6}H_{6}Cr(CO)_{2}Ar. Evidence also exists for ArHMn(CO)_{4}, ArCH_{3}Mn(CO)_{4}, and fac-(η^{2}-dfepe)Cr(CO)_{3}Ar.

Other noble gas complexes have been studied by photolysis of carbonyls dissolved in liquid rare gas, possibly under pressure. These Kr or Xe complexes decay on the time scale of seconds, but argon does not seem to have been studied this way. The advantage of liquid noble gases is that the medium is completely transparent to infrared radiation, which is needed to study the bond vibration in the solute.

Attempts have been made to study carbonyl–argon adducts in the gas phase, but the interaction appears to be too weak to observe a spectrum. In the gas form, the absorption lines are broadened into bands because of rotation that happens freely in a gas. The argon adducts in liquids or gases are unstable as the molecules easily react with the other photolysis products, or dimerize, eliminating argon.

== Coinage metal monohalides ==
The argon coinage metal monohalides were the first noble gas metal halides discovered, when the metal monohalide molecules were put through an argon jet. There were first found in Vancouver in 2000. ArMX with M = Cu, Ag or Au and X = F, Cl or Br have been prepared. The molecules are linear. In ArAuCl the Ar−Au bond is 2.47 Å, the stretching frequency is 198 cm^{−1} and the dissociation energy is 47 kJ/mol. ArAgBr also has been made. ArAgF has a dissociation energy of 21 kJ/mol. The Ar−Ag bond-length in these molecules is 2.6 Å. ArAgCl is isoelectronic with AgCl_{2}^{−} which is better known. The Ar−Cu bond length in these molecules is 2.25 Å.

== Transition metal oxides ==
In a solid argon matrix VO_{2} forms VO_{2}Ar_{2}, and VO_{4} forms VO_{4}·Ar with binding energy calculated to be 13.5 and 5.0 kcal (56 and 21 kJ) mol^{-1}. Scandium in the form of ScO^{+} coordinates five argon atoms to yield ScOAr_{5}^{+}. these argon atoms can be substituted by numbers of krypton or xenon atoms to yield even more mixed noble gas molecules. With yttrium, YO^{+} bonds six argon atoms, and these too can be substituted by varying numbers of krypton or xenon atoms.

In the case of transition metal monoxides, ScO, TiO and VO do not form a molecule with one argon atom. However CrO, MnO, FeO, CoO and NiO can each coordinate one argon atom in a solid argon matrix. The metal monoxide molecules can be produced by laser ablation of the metal trioxide, followed by condensation on solid argon. ArCrO absorbs at 846.3 cm^{−1}, ArMnO at 833.1, ArFeO at 872.8, ArCoO at 846.2, Ar^{58}NiO at 825.7 and Ar^{60}NiO at 822.8 cm^{−1}. All these molecules are linear.

There are also claims of argon forming coordination molecules in NbO_{2}Ar_{2}, NbO_{4}Ar, TaO_{4}Ar, VO_{2}Ar_{2}, VO_{4}Ar, Rh(η^{2}-O_{2})Ar_{2}, Rh(η^{2}-O_{2})_{2}Ar_{2}, Rh(η^{2}-O_{2})(η^{1}-OO)Ar.

Tungsten trioxide, WO_{3}, and tungsten dioxide mono-superoxide (η^{2}-O_{2})WO_{2} can both coordinate argon in an argon matrix. The argon can be replaced by xenon or molecular oxygen to make xenon coordinated compounds or superoxides. For WO_{3}Ar the binding energy is 9.4 kcal (39 kJ) mol^{-1} and for (η^{2}-O_{2})WO_{2} it is 8.1 kcal (34 kJ) mol^{-1}.

== Other transition metal compounds ==
ArNiN_{2} binds argon with 11.52 kcal (48.2 kJ) mol^{-1}. The bending frequency of ArN_{2} is changed from 310.7 to 358.7 cm^{−1} when argon attaches to the nickel atom.

== Other ions ==
Some other binary ions observed that contain argon include BaAr^{2+} and BaAr_{2}^{2+}, VAr^{+}, CrAr^{+}, FeAr^{+}, CoAr^{+}, and NiAr^{+}.

Gold and silver cluster ions can bind argon. Known ions are Au_{3}Ar^{+}, Au_{3}Ar_{2}^{+}, Au_{3}Ar_{3}^{+}, Au_{2}AgAr_{3}^{+} and AuAg_{2}Ar_{3}^{+}. These have a triangular shaped metallic core with argon bound at the vertexes.

ArF^{+} is also known to be formed in the reaction

F_{2}^{+} + Ar → ArF^{+} + F

and also

Ar^{+} + F_{2} → ArF^{+} + F

and also

SF_{4}^{2+} + Ar → ArF^{+} + SF_{3}^{+}.

The ions can be produced by ultraviolet light at 79.1 nm or less. The ionisation energy of fluorine is higher than that of argon, so breakup occurs thus:

ArF^{+} → Ar^{+} + F

The millimeter wave spectrum of ArF^{+} between 119.0232 and 505.3155 GHz (2.518773 and 0.5932778 mm) has been measured to calculate molecular constants B_{0} = 14.8788204 GHz, D_{0} = 28.718 kHz. There is a possibility that a solid salt of ArF^{+} could be prepared with SbF_{6}^{−} or AuF_{6}^{−} anions.

Excited or ionized argon atoms can react with molecular iodine gas to yield ArI^{+} Argon plasma is used as an ionisation source and carrier gas in inductively coupled plasma mass spectrometry. This plasma reacts with samples to produce monatomic ions, but also forms argon oxide (ArO^{+}), and argon nitride (ArN^{+}) cations, which can cause isobaric interference with detection and measurement of iron-56 (^{56}Fe) and iron-54 (^{54}Fe), respectively, in mass spectrometry. Platinum present in stainless steel can form platinum argide (PtAr^{+}) which interferes with the detection of uranium-234 which can be used as a tracer in aquifers. Argon chloride cations can interfere with the detection of arsenic as Ar^{35}Cl^{+} has a mass-to-charge ratio almost identical to that of arsenic's one stable isotope, ^{75}As. In these circumstances ArO^{+} may be removed by reaction with NH_{3}. Alternatively electrothermal vaporization or using helium gas can avoid these interference problems. Argon can also form an anion with chlorine, ArCl^{−}, though this is not a problem for mass spectrometry applications as only cations are detected.

The argon borynium ion, BAr^{+} is produced when BBr^{+} at energies between 9 and 11 eV reacts with argon atoms. 90% of the positive charge is on the argon atom.

ArC^{+} ions can be formed when argon ions impact carbon monoxide with energies between 21 and 60 eV. However more C^{+} ions are formed, and when the energy is on the high side, O^{+} is higher.

ArN^{+} can form when argon ions impact dinitrogen with energies between 8.2 and 41.2 eV and peaking around 35 eV. However far more N_{2}^{+} and N^{+} are produced.

ArXe^{+} is held together with a strength of 1445 cm^{−1} when it is in the X electronic state, but 1013 cm^{−1} when it is in the B excited state.

Metal–argon cations are called "argides". The argide ions produced during mass spectroscopy have higher intensity when the binding energy of the ion is higher. Transition elements have higher binding and ion flux intensity compared to main group elements. Argides can be formed in the plasma by excited argon atoms reacting with another element atom, or by an argon atom binding with another ion:

Ar^{+} + M → ArM^{+} + e^{−}; M<^{+} + Ar → ArM^{+}.

Doubly charged cations, called superelectrophiles, are capable of reacting with argon. Ions produced include ArCF_{2}^{2+} ArCH_{2}^{+}, ArBF_{2}^{+} and ArBF^{2+} containing bonds between argon and carbon or boron.

Doubly ionised acetylene HCCH^{2+} reacts inefficiently with argon to yield HCCAr^{2+}. This product competes with the formation of Ar^{+} and argonium.

The SiF_{3}^{2+} ion reacts with argon to yield ArSiF_{2}^{2+}.

Ion	Bond length (Å)	Dissociation energy (kJ/mol)
ArH^{+}		328 (3.4 eV)
LiAr^{+}	2.343	29 (0.30 eV)
BeAr^{+}		49 (4100 cm^{−1})
BAr^{+}	2.590	210
ArC^{+}		
ArN^{+}	3.5	208 (2.16 eV)
ArO^{+}		
ArF^{+}	1.637	194
NaAr^{+}		19.3
MgAr^{+}	2.88	14 (1200 cm^{−1})
AlAr^{+}		11.7 (982 cm^{−1})
SiAr^{+}		
ArP^{+}		
ArS^{+}		
ArCl^{+}		
Ar_{2}^{+}		
CaAr^{+}		8 (700 cm^{−1})
ScAr^{+}		
TiAr^{+}		30 (0.31 eV)
VAr^{+}	2.65	35.58 (D_{0}=2974 cm^{−1})
CrAr^{+}		27.99 (D_{0}=2340 cm^{−1})
MnAr^{+}		14.4 (0.149 eV)
FeAr^{+}		11 (0.11 eV)
CoAr^{+}	2.385	49.18 (D_{0}=4111 cm^{−1})
NiAr^{+}		54.69 (D_{0}=4572 cm^{−1})
CuAr^{+}		51 (0.53 eV)
ZnAr^{+}	2.72	24 (0.25 eV); 32.37 (D_{0}=2706 cm^{−1})
GaAr^{+}		
AsAr^{+}		
RbAr^{+}		
SrAr^{+}		800
ZrAr^{+}	2.72	32.37 (D_{0} = 2706 cm^{−1})
ZrAr^{+*} (excited state)	3.050	14.10 (1179 cm^{−1})
NbAr^{+}	2.677	37.16 (D_{0}=3106 cm^{−1})
AgAr^{+}		
InAr^{+}		
ArI^{+}		
BaAr^{+}		7 (600 cm^{−1})

=== Polyatomic cations ===
Metal ions can also form with more than one argon atom, in a kind of argon metal cluster. Different sized metal ions at the centre of a cluster can fit different geometries of argons atoms around the ion. Argides with multiple argon atoms have been detected in mass spectrometry. These can have variable numbers of argon attached, but there are magic numbers, where the complex more commonly has a particular number, either four or six argon atoms. These can be studied by time of flight mass spectrometer analysis and by the photodissociation spectrum. Other study methods include Coulomb explosion analysis. Argon-tagging is a technique whereby argon atoms are weakly bound to a molecule under study. It results in a much lower temperature of the tagged molecules, with sharper infra-red absorption lines. The argon-tagged molecules can be disrupted by photons of a particular wavelength.

Lithium ions add argon atoms to form clusters with more than a hundred argon atoms. The clusters Li^{+}Ar_{4}, and Li^{+}Ar_{4} are particularly stable and common. Calculations show that the small clusters are all quite symmetrical. Li^{+}Ar_{2} is linear, Li^{+}Ar_{3} is flat and triangular shaped with D_{3h} symmetry, Li^{+}Ar_{4} is tetrahedral, Li^{+}Ar_{5} could be a square pyramid or trigonal bipyramid shape. Li^{+}Ar_{6} is an octahedron shape with Li at the centre. Li^{+}Ar_{7} or slightly larger clusters have a core octahedron of argon atoms with one or more triangular faces capped by other argon atoms. The bonding is much weaker, which explains their greater scarcity.

Sodium forms clusters with argon atoms with peaks at numbers of 8, 10, 16, 20, 23, 25 and 29, and also at the icosahedral numbers of 47, 50, 57, 60, 63, 77, 80, 116 and 147 argon atoms. This includes the square antiprism (8) and the capped square antiprism (10 atoms). In Ti^{+}Ar_{1−n} the argon atoms induce a mixing of the ground electronic state of 3d^{2}4s^{1} with 3d^{3}4s^{0}. When a plasma of titanium in expanding argon gas is made via a laser, clusters from Ti^{+}Ar up to Ti^{+}Ar_{50} are formed. But Ti^{+}Ar_{6} is much more common than all the others. In this the six argon atoms are arranged in an octahedron shape around the central titanium ion. For Ti^{+}Ar_{2} DFT calculations predict it is linear, Ti^{+}Ar_{3} is not even flat, and has one short and two longer Ti-Ar bonds. Ti^{+}Ar_{4} is a distorted tetrahedron, with one longer Ti-Ar bond. Ti^{+}Ar_{5} is an asymmetrical trigonal bipyramid shape with one bond shorter. For clusters with seven or more argon atoms, the structure contains a Ti^{+}Ar_{6} octahedron with triangular faces capped by more argon atoms.

Cu^{+}Ar_{2} is predicted to be linear. Cu^{+}Ar_{3} is predicted to be planar T-shaped with an Ar-Cu-Ar angle of 93°. Cu^{+}Ar_{4} is predicted to be rhombic planar (not square or tetrahedral). For alkali and alkaline earth metals the M^{+}Ar_{4} cluster is tetrahedral. Cu^{+}Ar_{5} is predicted to have a rhombic pyramid shape. Cu^{+}Ar_{6} has a flattened octahedral shape. Cu^{+}Ar_{7} is much less stable, and the seventh argon atom is outside an inner shell of six argon atoms. This is called capped octahedral. A complete second shell of argon atoms yields Cu^{+}Ar_{34}. Above this number a structural change takes place with an icosahedral arrangement with Cu^{+}Ar_{55} and Cu^{+}Ar_{146} having more stability.

With a strontium ion Sr^{+} from two to eight argon atoms can form clusters. Sr^{+}Ar_{2} has a triangle shape with C_{2v} symmetry. Sr^{+}Ar_{3} has a trigonal pyramid shape with C_{3v} symmetry. Sr^{+}Ar_{4} has two trigonal pyramids sharing a face and strontium at the common apex. It has a C_{2v} symmetry. Sr^{+}Ar_{6} has a pentagonal pyramid of argon atoms with the strontium atom below the base.

Niobium tetraargide, Nb^{+}Ar_{4} probably has the argon atoms arranged in a square around the niobium. Similarly for vanadium tetraargide, V^{+}Ar_{4}. The hexaargides, Co^{+}Ar_{6} and Rh^{+}Ar_{6} likely have octahedral argon arrangement. Indium monocation forms clusters with multiple argon, with magic numbers at 12, 18, 22, 25, 28, 45 and 54, and 70 argon atoms, which are numbers for icosahedral shapes.

By zapping copper metal with a UV laser in an argon-carbon monoxide mixture, argon tagged copper carbonyl cations are formed. These ions can be studied by observing which wavelengths of infrared radiation cause the molecules to break up. These molecular ions include CuCO^{+}Ar, Cu(CO)_{2}^{+}Ar, Cu(CO)_{3}^{+}Ar, Cu(CO)_{4}^{+}Ar which are respectively disrupted to lose argon, by infrared wavenumbers 2216, 2221, 2205 and 2194 cm^{−1} respectively. The argon binding energy is respectively 16.3, 1.01, 0.97 and 0.23 kcal (68.20, 4.23, 4.06 and 0.96 kJ) mol^{-1}. The infrared absorption peak for Cu(CO)_{3}^{+}Ar is 2205 cm^{−1} compared to 2199 cm^{−1} for Cu(CO)_{3}^{+}Ar. For Cu(CO)_{4}^{+}Ar the peak is at 2198 cm^{−1} compared to 2193 for Cu(CO)_{4}^{+}. For Cu(CO)_{2}^{+}Ar the peak is at 2221 cm^{−1} compared to 2218.3 for argon free, and for CuCO^{+}Ar the peak is at 2216 cm^{−1} considerably different to 2240.6 cm^{−1} for CuCO^{+}. Computationally predicted shapes for these molecular ions are linear for CuCO^{+}Ar, slightly bent T-shaped for Cu(CO)_{2}^{+}Ar and a trigonal pyramid with argon at the top and a flat star like copper tricarbonyl forming the base.

Ions studied by argon tagging include the hydrated proton H^{+}(H_{2}O)_{n}Ar with n = 2 to 5, hydrated 18-crown-6 ether alkali metal ions, hydrated alkali metal ions, transition metal acetylene complexes, protonated ethylene, and IrO_{4}^{+}.

Argon methyl cations, (or methyliumargon) Ar_{x}CH_{3}^{+} are known for n = 1 to 8. CH_{3}^{+} is a Y shape, and when argon atoms are added they go above and below the plane of the Y. If more argon atoms are added they line up with the hydrogen atoms. ΔH^{0} for ArCH_{3}^{+} is 11 kcal (46 kJ) mol^{-1}, and Δ_{r}H^{0} is 13.5 kcal (56 kJ) mol^{-1} for 2 Ar + CH_{3}^{+} → Ar_{2}CH_{3}^{+}.

Boroxyl ring cationic complexes with argon [ArB_{3}O_{4}]^{+}, [ArB_{3}O_{5}]^{+}, [ArB_{4}O_{6}]^{+} and [ArB_{5}O_{7}]^{+} were prepared via a laser vaporization at cryogenic temperatures and investigated by infrared gas phase spectroscopy. They were the first large stable gas phase complexes that feature strong dative bonding between argon and boron.

=== Dications ===
Dications with argon are known for the coinage metals. Known dications include CuAr_{n}^{2+} and AgAr_{n}^{2+} for n = 1-8, with a peak occurrence of CuAr_{4}^{2+}, or AgAr_{4}^{2+}, and AuAr_{n}^{2+} n = 3–7. In addition to the four argon atoms, the six argon atoms clusters have enhanced concentration. The stability of the ions with two positive charges is unexpected as the ionization energy of argon is lower than the second ionization energy of the metal atom. So the positive second charge on the metal atom should move to the argon, ionizing it, and then forming a highly repulsive molecule that undergoes a Coulomb explosion. However these molecules appear to be kinetically stable, and to transfer the charge to an argon atom, they have to pass through a higher energy state. The clusters with four argon atoms are expected to be square planar, and those with six, to be octahedral distorted by the Jahn–Teller effect.

Ion	Metal first ionization energy eV	Metal second ionization eV	binding energy eV	Dissociation energy (kJ/mol)	Bond length (Å)
Cu^{2+}Ar	7.73	20.29	0.439		2.4
Ag^{2+}Ar	7.58	21.5	0.199		2.6
Au^{2+}Ar	9.22	20.5	0.670		2.6

=== Polyatomic anions ===
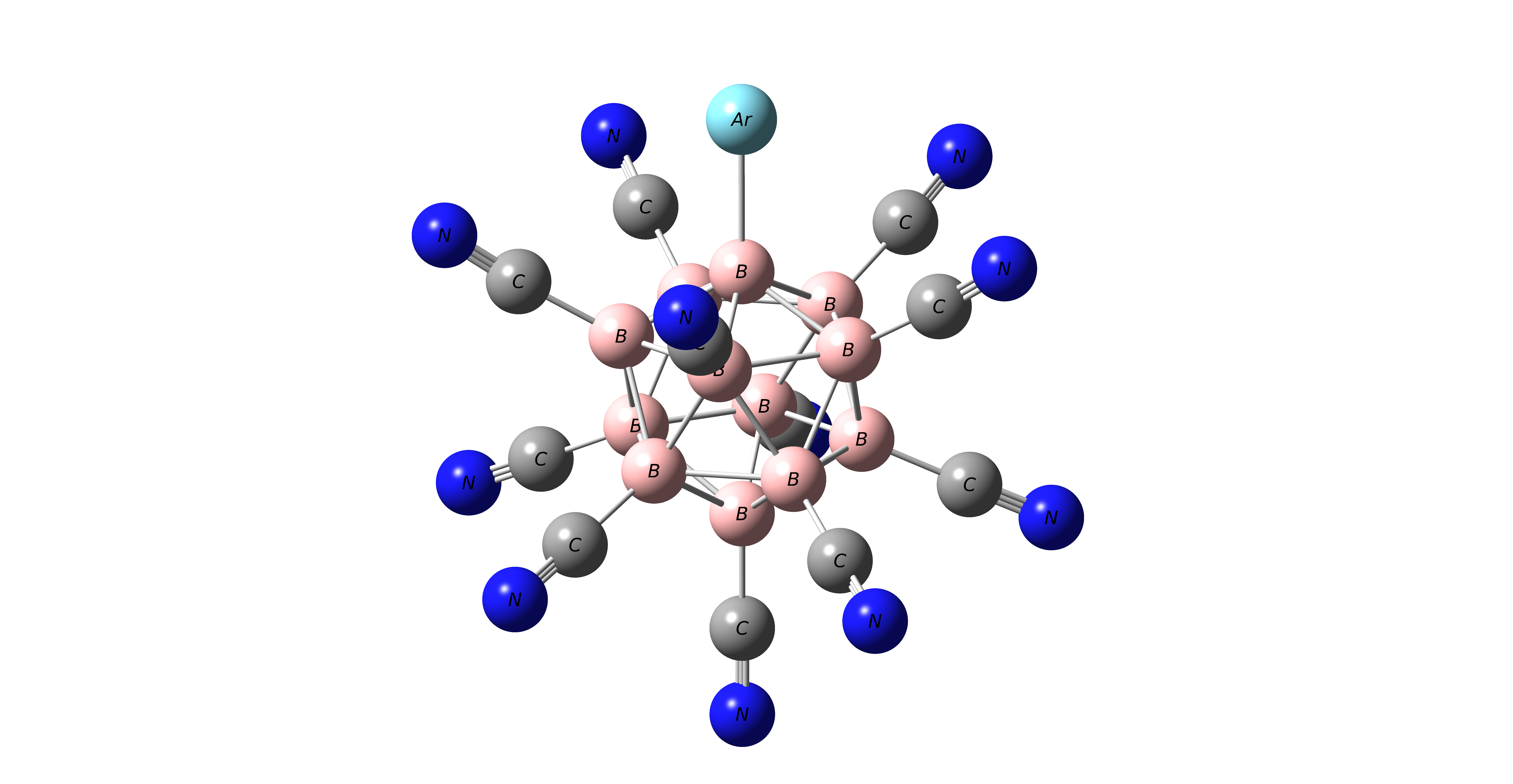
Ball-and-stick model of the complex of superelectrophilic anion [B_{12}(CN)_{11}]^{−} with Ar. B_{12} core has nearly icosahedral symmetry. B – pink, C – grey, N – dark blue, Ar – blue.

Examples of anions containing strong bonds with noble gases are extremely rare: generally nucleophilic nature of anions results in their inability to bind to noble gases with their negative electron affinity. However, the 2017 discovery of "superelectrophilic anions", gas phase fragmentation products of closo-dodecaborates, led to the observation of stable anionic compounds containing a boron-noble gas bond with significant degree of covalent interaction. The most reactive superelectrophilic anion [B_{12}(CN)_{11}]^{−}, fragmentation product of cyanated cluster [B_{12}(CN)_{12}]^{2−}, was reported to bind argon spontaneously at room temperature.

== Solid compounds ==
Armand Gautier noticed that rock contained argon (and also nitrogen) that was liberated when the rock was dissolved in acid however how the argon was combined in rock was ignored by the scientific community.

=== Fullerene solvates ===
Solid buckminsterfullerene has small spaces between the C_{60} balls. Under 200 MPa (2,000 atm) pressure and 200 °C (473 K) heat for 12 hours, argon can be intercalated into the solid to form crystalline Ar_{1}C_{60}. Once this cools down it is stable at standard conditions for months. Argon atoms occupy octahedral interstitial sites. The crystalline lattice size is almost unchanged at room temperature, but is slightly larger than pure C_{60} below −8 °C (265 K). However argon does stop the buckyballs spinning below −23 °C (250 K), a lower temperature than in pure C_{60}.

Solid C_{70} fullerene will also absorb argon under pressure of 200 MPa and at a temperature of 200 °C (473 K). C_{70}·Ar has argon in octahedral sites and has the rock salt structure, with cubic crystals in which the lattice parameter is 15.001 Å. This compares to the pure C_{70} lattice parameter of 14.964 Å, so the argon forces the crystals to expand slightly. The C_{70} ellipsoidal balls rotate freely in the solid, they are not locked into position by extra argon atoms filling the holes. Argon gradually escapes over a couple of days when the solid is stored at standard conditions, so that C_{70}·Ar is less stable than C_{60}·Ar. This is likely to be due to the shape and internal rotation allowing channels through which Ar atoms can move.

When fullerenes are dissolved and crystallized from toluene, solids may form with toluene included as part of the crystal. However, if this crystallization is performed under a high pressure argon atmosphere, toluene is not included, being replaced by argon. The argon is then removed from the resultant crystal by heating to produce unsolvated solid fullerene.

=== Clathrate ===
Argon forms a clathrate with hydroquinone (HOC_{6}H_{4}OH)_{3}·Ar. When crystallised from benzene under a pressure of 2.0 MPa (20 atm) of argon, a well defined structure containing argon results. An argon-phenol clathrate 4C_{6}H_{5}OH·Ar is also known. It has a binding energy of 40 kJ (9.6 kcal) mol^{-1}. Other substituted phenols can also crystallise with argon. The argon water clathrate is described in the section on aqueous argon.

=== Argon difluoride ===
Argon difluoride, ArF_{2}, is predicted to be stable at pressures over 57 GPa. It should be an electrical insulator.

=== Ne_{2}Ar and Ar_{2}Ne ===
At around 4 K there are two phases where neon and argon are mixed as a solid: Ne_{2}Ar and Ar_{2}Ne. With Kr, solid argon forms a disorganized mixture.

=== ArH_{4} ===
Under high pressure stoichiometric solids are formed with hydrogen and oxygen: Ar(H_{2})_{2} and Ar(O_{2})_{3}.

Ar(H_{2})_{2} crystallises in the hexagonal C14 MgZn_{2} Laves phase. It is stable to at least 200 GPa, but is predicted to change at 250 GPa to an AlB_{2} structure. At even higher pressures the hydrogen molecules should break up followed by metallization.

=== ArO and ArO_{6} ===
Oxygen and argon under pressure at room temperature form several different alloys with different crystal structures. Argon atoms and oxygen molecules are similar in size, so that a greater range of miscibility occurs compared to other gas mixtures. Solid argon can dissolve up to 5% oxygen without changing structure. Below 50% oxygen a hexagonal close packed phase exists. This is stable from about 3 to 8.5 GPa. Typical formula is ArO. With more oxygen between 5.5 and 7 GPa, a cubic Pm3n structure exists, but under higher pressure it changes to a I4̅2d space group form. With more than 8.5 GPa these alloys separate to solid argon and ε-oxygen. The cubic structure has a unit cell edge of 5.7828 Å at 6.9 GPa. The representative formula is Ar(O_{2})_{3}.

=== ArHe_{2} ===
Using density-functional theory ArHe_{2} is predicted to exist with the MgCu_{2} Laves phase structure at high pressures below 13.8 GPa. Above 13.8 GPa it transforms to AlB_{2} structure.

=== Ar-TON ===
Under pressure argon inserts into zeolite. Argon has an atomic radius of 1.8 Å, so it can insert into pores if they are big enough. Each unit cell of the TON zeolite can contain up to 5 atoms of argon, compared to 12 of neon. Argon infused TON zeolite (Ar-TON) is more compressible than Ne-TON as the unoccupied pores become elliptical under increased pressure. When Ar-TON is brought to atmospheric pressure, the argon only desorbs slowly, so that some remains in the solid without external pressure for a day.

=== Nickel argide ===
At 140 GPa and 1,230 °C (1,500 K) nickel and argon form an alloy, NiAr. NiAr is stable at room temperature and a pressure as low as 99 GPa. It has a face-centred cubic (fcc) structure. The compound is metallic. Each nickel atom loses 0.2 electrons to an argon atom which is thereby an oxidant. This contrasts with Ni_{3}Xe, in which nickel is the oxidant. The volume of the ArNi compound is 5% less than that of the separate elements at these pressures. If this compound exists in the core of the Earth it could explain why only half the argon-40 that should be produced during the radioactive decay that produces geothermal heating seems to exist on the Earth.

== Organoargon chemistry ==
Organoargon chemistry describes the synthesis and properties of chemical compounds containing a carbon to argon chemical bond.

Very few such compounds are known. The reaction of acetylene dications with argon produced HCCAr^{2+} in 2008. Reaction of the CF_{3}^{2+} dication with argon produced ArCF_{2}^{2+}: this reaction is unique to argon among the noble gases.

The compound FArCCH has been theoretically studied and is predicted to be stable. FArCCF might also be stable enough to synthesise and detect, but probably not FArCCArF. Calculations in 2015 suggest that FArCCH and FArCH_{3} are stable, but not FArCN. FArCC^{−} should be kinetically stable, as is also expected of the krypton and xenon (but not helium) analogues. HArC_{4}H (for which the krypton analogue is known) and HArC_{6}H have also been predicted as stable. FArCO^{+} and ClArCO^{+} should be metastable and might be possible to characterise under cryogenic conditions. Calculations suggest that HArCCF and HCCArF should be stable, and that HNgCCF molecules should be more stable than HNgCCH (Ng = Ar, Kr, Xe); the corresponding krypton species have been experimentally produced, but not the argon species despite an experimental attempt. HCCNgCN and HCCNgNC (Ng = Ar, Kr, Xe) are likewise computed to be stable, but experimental searches for them have failed.
