= AR2 =

AR2 may refer to:

- AR2 (train), European railbus
- Arkhangelsky Ar-2, Soviet dive bomber
- Arkansas's 2nd congressional district
- Arkansas Highway 2
- Dorand AR2, a French two-seater aircraft of World War I, also converted to a two-casualty ambulance version
- Ar_{2}, the chemical formula for diargon

== See also ==
- SAR (IPCC), the IPCC Second Assessment Report (aka AR2)
