= WIMP Argon Programme =

The WIMP Argon Programme (WARP) is an experiment at Laboratori Nazionali del Gran Sasso, Italy, for the research of cold dark matter. It aims to detect nuclear recoils in liquid argon induced by weakly interacting massive particles (WIMP) through scintillation light; the apparatus can also detect ionization so to exclude interactions of photons and electrons. The experiment is a recognized CERN experiment (RE15).

== Collaboration members ==
Università degli Studi di Pavia e INFN

P.Benetti, E.Calligarich, M.Cambiaghi, C.Montanari(+), A.Rappoldi, G.L.Raselli, M.Roncadelli, M.Rossella, C.Vignoli

Laboratori Nazionali del Gran Sasso (INFN-LNGS)

M. Antonello, O.Palamara, L.Pandola, C.Rubbia(*), E.Segreto, A.Szelc

Università degli Studi dell'Aquila e INFN

R.Acciarri, M. Antonello, N. Canci, F.Cavanna, F.Di Pompeo(++), L.Grandi(++)

(++ also at INFN-LNGS)

Università degli Studi di Napoli e INFN

F.Carbonara, A.Cocco, G.Fiorillo, G.Mangano

Princeton University Department of Physics

F.Calaprice, C.Galbiati, B.Loer, R.Saldanha

Università degli Studi di Padova e INFN

B.Baibussinov, S.Centro, M.B.Ceolin, G.Meng, F.Pietropaolo, S.Ventura
