= Argon fluorohydride =

Chemical compound

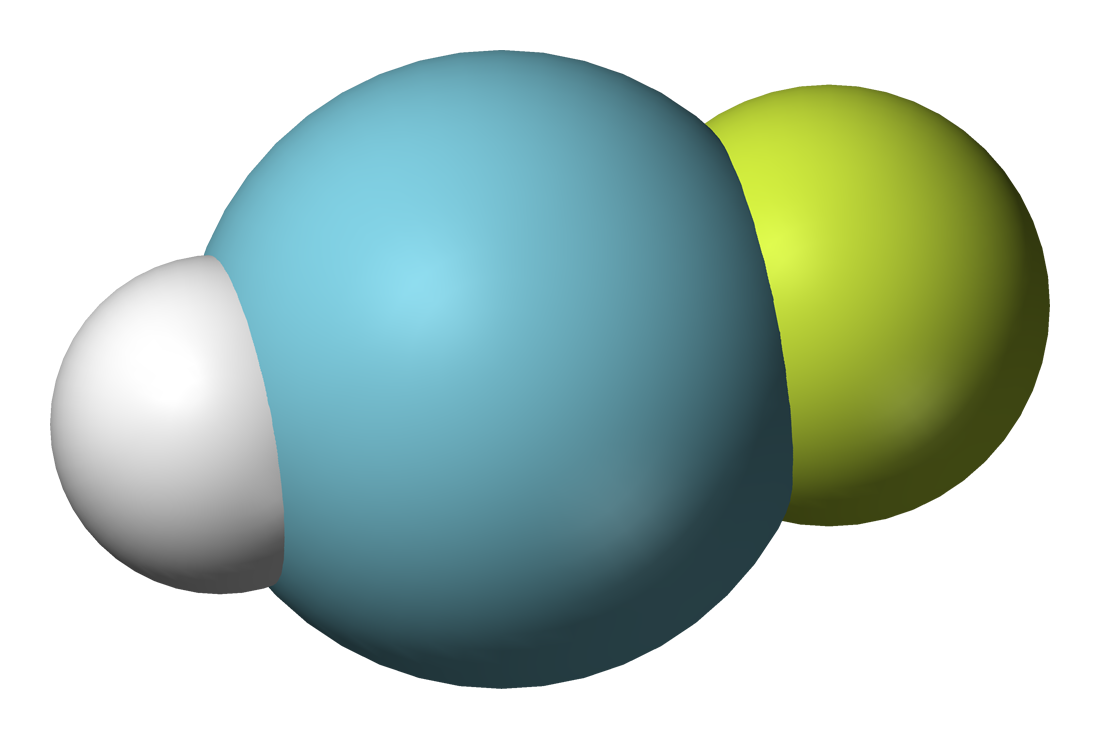
- Argon fluorohydride

Names
- Other names Argon hydrofluoride

Identifiers
CAS Number	163731-16-6
3D model (JSmol)	Interactive image
ChemSpider	15863741
PubChem CID	154735196
CompTox Dashboard (EPA)	DTXSID701018815
- InChI: InChI=1S/ArFH/c1-2/h1H Key: HEPJAPHKUAGBIG-UHFFFAOYSA-N; InChI=1/ArFH/c1-2/h1H Key: HEPJAPHKUAGBIG-UHFFFAOYAL
- SMILES: F[ArH]

Properties
Chemical formula	HArF
Molar mass	59.954 g/mol
Appearance	Unknown
Density	Unknown
Melting point	−256 °C (−428.8 °F; 17.1 K) (decomposes)
Solubility in water	Unknown
- Except where otherwise noted, data are given for materials in their standard state (at 25 °C [77 °F], 100 kPa). verify (what is ?) Infobox references

Argon fluorohydride (systematically named fluoridohydridoargon) or argon hydrofluoride is an inorganic compound with the chemical formula HArF (also written ArHF). It is a compound of the chemical element argon.

== Discovery ==
The discovery of this argon compound is credited to a group of Finnish scientists, led by Markku Räsänen. On 24 August 2000, in the journal Nature, they announced their discovery of argon fluorohydride. This discovery caused the recognition that argon could form weakly bound compounds, even though it was not the first compound made with noble gases.

== Synthesis ==
This chemical was synthesized by mixing argon and hydrogen fluoride on a caesium iodide surface at 8 K (−265 °C), and exposing the mixture to ultraviolet radiation. This caused the gases to combine.

The infrared spectrum of the resulting gas mixture shows that it definitely contains chemical bonds, albeit very weak ones; thus, it is argon fluorohydride, and not a supermolecule or a mixture of argon and hydrogen fluoride. Its chemical bonds are stable only if the substance is kept at temperatures below 27 K (−246 °C); upon warming, it decomposes into argon and hydrogen fluoride.
