= Oxygen–argon ratio =

In chemistry, a sample's oxygen–argon ratio (or oxygen/argon ratio) is a comparison between the concentrations of oxygen (O_{2}) and the noble gas argon (Ar), either in air or dissolved in a liquid such as seawater. The two gases have very similar physical properties such as solubility and diffusivity, as well as a similar temperature dependence, making them easy to compare.

== Applications ==
=== Biological activity in seawater ===
Measurements of primary productivity in the ocean can be made using this ratio. The concentration of oxygen dissolved in seawater varies according to biological processes (photosynthesis and respiration) as well as physical processes (air-sea gas exchange, temperature and pressure changes, lateral mixing and vertical diffusion). Argon concentrations, by contrast, vary only by physical processes.

This technique was first used by Craig and Hayward (1987) when they separated oxygen supersaturations into a biological and a physical component. This O_{2}/Ar supersaturation can be defined as

∆(O_{2}/Ar)=(c(O_{2} )/c(Ar)) / (c_{sat}(O_{2})/(c_{sat}(Ar))) -1

where (∆O_{2})/Ar is the difference between O_{2} production via photosynthesis and removal via respiration, c is the concentration of dissolved gas and c_{sat} is the saturated concentration of the gas in water at a specific temperature, salinity and pressure.

Oxygen and argon concentrations can be compared using samples from water systems aboard ships using either a membrane inlet mass spectrometer (MIMS) or an equilibrator inlet mass spectrometer (EIMS). The measurements can then be used in conjunction with air-sea gas exchange values to calculate biologically induced air-sea O_{2} fluxes and net community production.

=== Determining leakage rates in sealed packaging ===
Because oxygen and argon leak through packaging material at different rates, comparing the ratios inside a package can determine if and how quickly air from outside has leaked in.

=== Manufacturing ===
The characteristics of steel, in particular the carbon and chromium content, can be controlled by adjusting the oxygen/argon ratio during the manufacturing process. The oxygen/argon ratio is also important in the creation of thin films used in the manufacture of lithium-ion batteries.
