= Magnesium argide =

Ion

The magnesium argide ion, MgAr^{+} is an ion composed of one ionised magnesium atom, Mg^{+} and an argon atom. It is important in inductively coupled plasma mass spectrometry and in the study of the field around the magnesium ion. The ionization potential of magnesium is lower than the first excitation state of argon, so the positive charge in MgAr^{+} will reside on the magnesium atom. Neutral MgAr molecules can also exist in an excited state.

== Spectrum ==
The spectrum of MgAr^{+} can be observed. It resembles that of Mg^{+}, however some lines are blue shifted and others red shifted. In Mg^{+} the ground state is termed ^{2}S. A first excited state has a 3s electron moved to the 3p orbital and the state is termed ^{2}P. But because of spin-orbit coupling it is actually split into ^{2}P_{1/2} and ^{2}P_{3/2} with energy 35,669 and 35,761 cm^{−1}. In comparison the ionic molecule has a ground state called ^{2}Σ^{+}. The corresponding excited state is significantly split into two depending on whether the p orbital of the magnesium is pointing to the argon or is perpendicular. When the electron in the p orbital is perpendicular to the Mg-Ar axis, the argon sees a greater electrostatic force from the magnesium atom and is more tightly bound. This lowers the energy level of what is called the ^{2}Π level. This too is split into ^{2}Π_{1/2} and ^{2}Π_{3/2}. When the excited electron is in line with the argon the state is called ^{2}Σ^{+} and corresponds only to ^{2}P_{3/2} and so is not split.

The MgAr^{+} spectrum shows bands, with the first one at 31,396 cm^{−1}, which is redshifted 4300 cm^{−1} from Mg^{+}. The band is blue degraded. The band consists of a series of doublets. The two lines in the doublet are separated by 75 cm^{−1}, and from one pair to the next one is 270 cm^{−1}. This band is due to A_{2}Π ← X^{2}Σ^{+}.

== Properties ==
In the ground state the binding energy or MgAr_{+} is 1281 cm^{−1} and in the A^{2}Π_{1/2} state is 5554 cm^{−1} (3.66 kcal/mol). The A^{2}Π_{1/2} state has a stronger bond because a p electron overlaps the argon atom less, and thus has less repulsion. The dissociation energy of the ground state ion is 1295 cm^{−1} (15 kJ/mol).

The bond length is 2.854 Å for the ground state, and 2.406 Å for the excited state. The ^{2}Π state is predicted to have a radiative lifetime of about 6 nanoseconds.

== Neutral molecule ==
Unionized MgAr (magnesium argon) can also exist as a van der Waals molecule or temporarily in an excited state termed a Rydberg molecule. The neutral molecule can be formed by evaporating magnesium metal using a laser into argon gas, and then expanding it through a supersonic jet. When evaporated many magnesium atoms are excited into a 3s3p state (from the ground 3s3s). These can then attach an argon atom by way of a three body collision to yield Mg(3s3pπ ^{3}P_{J})Ar ^{3}Π. Then this excited state can lose energy via collisions to form Mg(3s3pπ ^{3}P_{J})Ar ^{3}Π_{0+,0−}. MgAr is mainly held together with dispersion forces which vary as the inverse sixth power of the separation. The ground state MgAr has electron configuration Mg(3s3s ^{1}S_{0})Ar ^{1}Σ^{+}. The triplet states with one excited electron include Mg(3s3pπ ^{3}P_{0})Ar ^{3}Π_{0+}, Mg(3s4s ^{3}S_{1})Ar ^{3}Σ^{+}, Mg(3s3dδ ^{3}D_{J})Ar ^{3}Δ, and Mg(3s4pπ ^{3}P_{J})Ar ^{3}Π_{0+}. A singlet single excited electron state is Mg(3s3pπ ^{1}P)Ar ^{1}Π.

The different excited states can be studied by resonance-enhanced two-photon ionization and mass spectroscopy. The absorption spectrum of MgAr shows bands due to electronic transitions combined with vibrational and rotational transitions. The spectrum involving electronic transition in the argon atom and a change in the d orbital of the magnesium, is very complex with 18 different branches

A doubly excited state, where two electrons on the magnesium atom are boosted to 3p sub-orbitals, has a strong binding energy, even higher than in MgAr^{+}. Normally an ion would bond an inert gas atom more strongly, as attraction varies as 1/R^{4}, compared to 1/R^{6} for a van der Waals molecule, and in an ion, the electron cloud shrinks due to the more positive charge attracting it. However in the doubly excited state both of the magnesium atoms are in p suborbitals, which can be arranged so that electron density is on a line perpendicular to a potential argon atom bond. This allows the two atoms to approach each other closer.

The neutral molecule has cas number 72052-59-6.

state	electron state	Mg excitation energy cm^{−1}	MgAr excitation energy cm^{−1}	bond length Å r_{e}	ω_{e}	dissociation energy cm^{−1}	B_{0}	B_{e}	α_{e}	D_{0} centrifugal distortion
ground	Mg(3s3s ^{1}S_{0})Ar ^{1}Σ^{+}	0	0	4.56		small				
singlet	Mg(3s3pπ ^{1}P)Ar ^{1}Π	34770	34770	3.31		175				
triplet	Mg(3s3pπ ^{3}P_{0})Ar ^{3}Π_{0+}	21850–21911	21760	3.66	102.7					1250
	Mg(3s4dσ ^{3}D_{J})Ar ^{3}Σ^{+}		53462	2.88	88.2		0.1338	0.1356	0.0037	800
	Mg(3s4dδ ^{3}D_{J})Ar ^{3}Δ		53063		104.1		0.1438	0.1462	0.0037	1199
	Mg(3s4dπ ^{3}D_{J})Ar ^{3}Π_{0}		53037		99.4					1225
	Mg(3s4s ^{3}S_{1})Ar ^{3}Σ^{+}	41197	40317	2.84						
	Mg(3s3dδ ^{3}D_{J})Ar ^{3}Δ	47957	46885	2.90	103.5	160	0.1274	0.1291	0.0035	1140
	Mg(3s3dπ ^{3}D_{J})Ar ^{3}Π			3.27	49.05	290	0.1019	0.1049	0.0061	289
	Mg(3s4pπ ^{3}P_{J})Ar ^{3}Π_{0+}	47847–47851	46663	2.84		1250				
	Mg(3s5pπ ^{3}P_{J})Ar ^{3}Π_{0}		53049		110.1					1272
double	Mg(3p3pπ ^{3}P_{J})Ar ^{3}Π_{0+}	57812–57873		2.41		2960				

== Solid ==
Under pressures over 250 gigapascals, MgAr is predicted to be stable as a solid with either an anti-NiAs or CsCl structure dependent on pressure. Mg_{2}Ar is predicted to be a stable solid with localized electrons in the structure, making it an electride. These pressures are higher than found in the Earth's mantle, but magnesium argides could form minerals in super-Earths.

== Application ==
MgAr^{+} can interfere with determination of copper or zinc isotopes when using inductively coupled plasma mass spectrometry, particularly when using a desolvated plasma. When analysing mineral specimens, magnesium is a common element found in rock matrix. It can react with the argon ions present in the plasma. In analysis of soil, MgAr^{+} interferes with detection of ^{65}Cu, though common isotopomer has a molecular weight of 64.95 compared to 64.93 for the copper 65 isotope. This is called isobaric interference.

== Extra reading ==
- Equipment used to study MgAr^{+}: Hoshino, Hiroshi; Yamakita, Yoshihiro; Okutsu, Kenichi; Suzuki, Yoshitomo; Saito, Masataka; Koyasu, Kiichirou; Ohshimo, Keijiro; Misaizu, Fuminori (June 2015). "Photofragment imaging from mass-selected ions using a reflectron mass spectrometer I. Development of an apparatus and application to Mg+–Ar complex". Chemical Physics Letters. 630: 111–115. doi:10.1016/j.cplett.2015.04.033.
- Saidi, Samah; Alharzali, Nissrin; Berriche, Hamid (6 March 2017). "A combining rule calculation of the ground-state van der Waals potentials of the magnesium rare-gas complexes". Molecular Physics. 115 (8): 931–941. Bibcode:2017MolPh.115..931S. doi:10.1080/00268976.2017.1292368. S2CID 53133441.
- Bennett, Robert R.; Breckenridge, W. H. (15 January 1992). "Van der Waals bonding in the lowest electronic states of MgAr, ZnAr, CdAr, and HgAr: Spectroscopic characterization of the b3Π2 and e3Σ+ states of the CdAr molecule". The Journal of Chemical Physics. 96 (2): 882–890. Bibcode:1992JChPh..96..882B. doi:10.1063/1.462108.
- Gaied, W.; Habli, H.; Oujia, B.; Gadea, F. X. (15 April 2011). "Theoretical study of the MgAr molecule and its ion Mg+Ar: potential energy curves and spectroscopic constants". The European Physical Journal D. 62 (3): 371–378. Bibcode:2011EPJD...62..371G. doi:10.1140/epjd/e2011-10572-y. S2CID 122010638.
- Crepin-Gilbert, C.; Tramer, A. (October 1999). "Photophysics of metal atoms in rare-gas complexes, clusters and matrices". International Reviews in Physical Chemistry. 18 (4): 485–556. Bibcode:1999IRPC...18..485C. doi:10.1080/014423599229901.
- Wehrli, Dominik; Génévriez, Matthieu; Knecht, Stefan; Reiher, Markus; Merkt, Frédéric (28 July 2021). "Charge-Transfer-Induced Predissociation in Rydberg States of Molecular Cations: MgAr +". The Journal of Physical Chemistry A. 125 (31): 6681–6696. Bibcode:2021JPCA..125.6681W. doi:10.1021/acs.jpca.1c03859. hdl:20.500.11850/502752. PMC 8775275. PMID 34319723. S2CID 236497664.
