= Diargon =

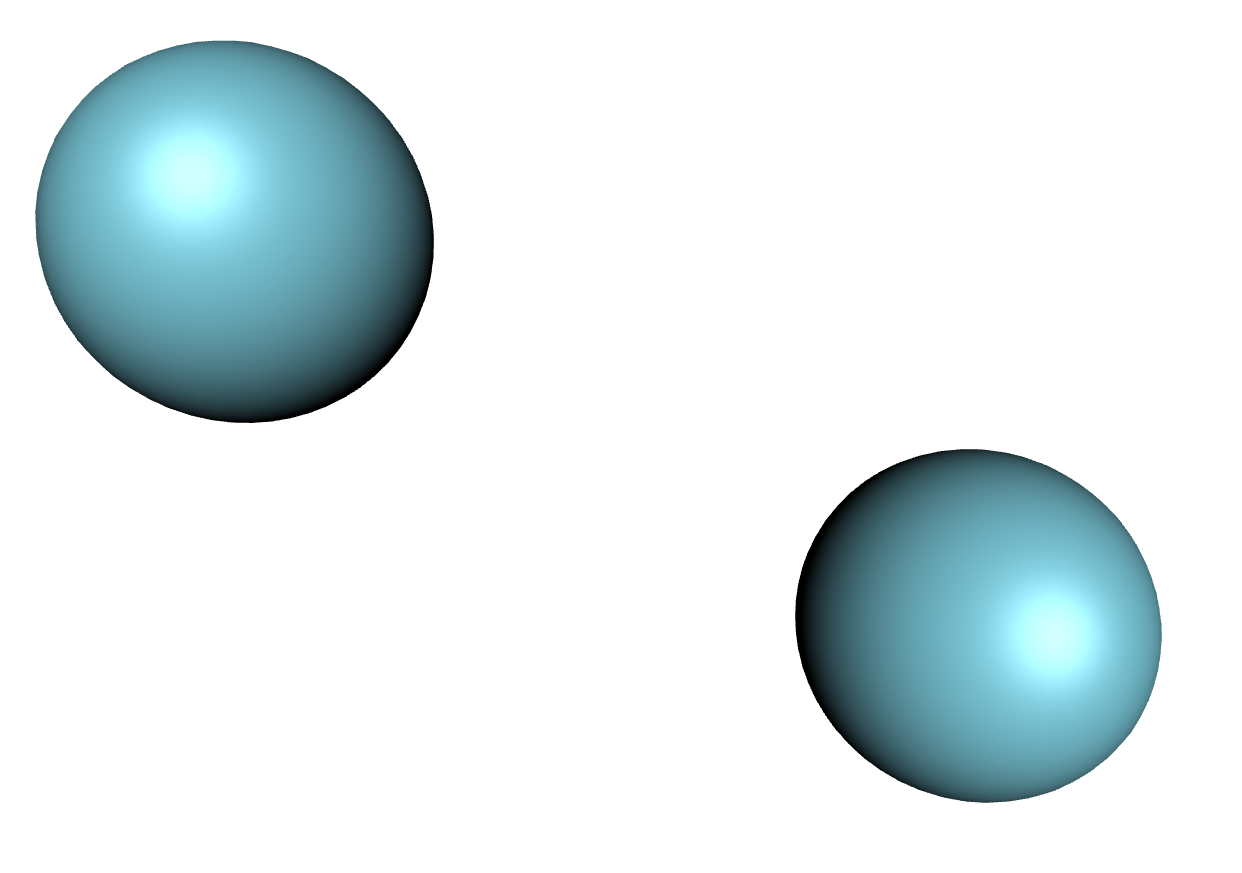

Names
- Other names argon dimer

Identifiers
CAS Number	12595-59-4
3D model (JSmol)	Interactive image
PubChem CID	6432035
- InChI: InChI=1S/2Ar Key: XMPZLAQHPIBDSO-UHFFFAOYSA-N
- SMILES: [Ar].[Ar]

Properties
Chemical formula	Ar_{2}
Molar mass	79.896 g·mol^{−1}
Appearance	transparent gas
- Except where otherwise noted, data are given for materials in their standard state (at 25 °C [77 °F], 100 kPa). Infobox references

Diargon or the argon dimer is a molecule containing two argon atoms. Normally, this is only very weakly bound together by van der Waals forces (a van der Waals molecule). However, in an excited state, or ionised state, the two atoms can be more tightly bound together, with significant spectral features. At cryogenic temperatures, argon gas can have a few percent of diargon molecules.

== Theory ==
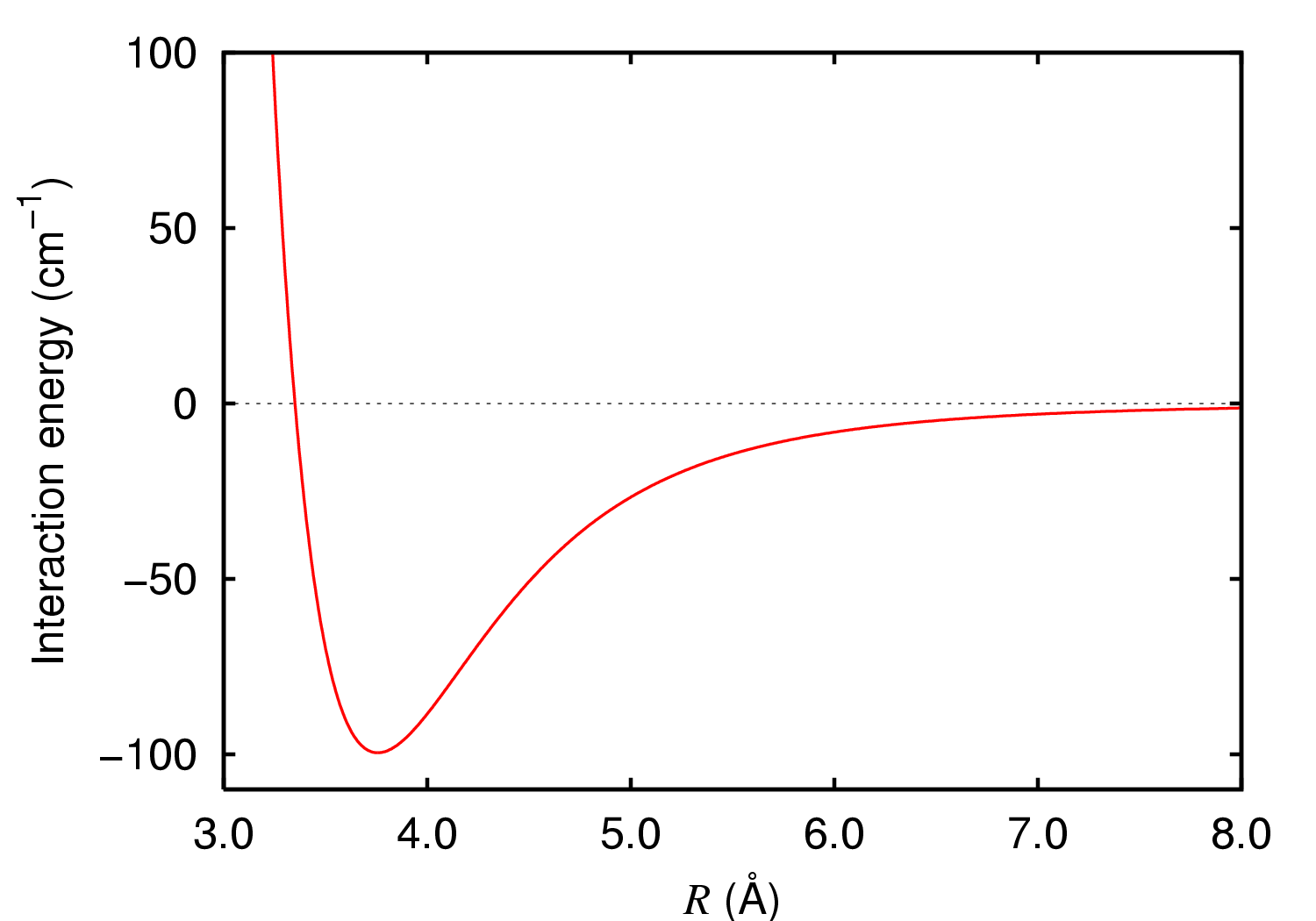
Interaction energy of argon dimer

Two argon atoms are attracted together by van der Waals forces when far from each other. When they are close, electrostatic forces repel them. There is a balance point where the van der Waals force matches the opposing repelling force, where energy is at a minimum, represented as the trough in the graph of interaction energy versus distance. This distance is the ground state of the unexcited argon dimer. In a vibrating molecule, the distance between the atoms bounces backwards and forwards from one side of the trough to the other. Faster vibrations will force the state up to higher levels in the energy trough. If the vibration is too much the molecule will break up. In a rotating molecule, the centrifugal force drags the atoms apart, but can still be overcome by the attractive force. But if the rotation is too much the atoms break apart.

== Properties ==
The ionisation energy of the neutral molecule is 14.4558 eV (or 116593 cm^{−1}).

The dissociation energy of neutral Ar_{2} in the ground state is 98.7 cm^{−1} which is hundreds of times weaker than that of typical molecules. The dissociation energy of Ar_{2}^{+} is 1.3144 eV or 10601 cm^{−1}.

The Ar_{2} molecule can exist in a number of different vibration and rotational states. If the molecule is not rotating, there are eight different vibration states. But if the molecule spins fast, vibration is more likely to shake it apart, and at the 30th rotational level there are only two stable and one metastable state of vibration. In combination, there are 170 different possibilities that are stable. In the metastable states, energy will be released if the molecule breaks apart into two separate atoms, but some extra energy is required to overcome the attraction between the atoms. Quantum tunneling can result in the molecule breaking apart with no extra energy. However this takes time, which can vary from 10^{−11} seconds to several centuries. Molecules crashing into each other also results in breakup of the van der Waals molecules. At standard conditions this only takes about 100 picoseconds.

=== Excited states ===
==== Neutral ====
99.6% of the argon isotopes are ^{40}Ar, so the spectrum observed in natural argon dimer will be due to the ^{40}Ar^{40}Ar isotopomer. The following table lists different excited states.

Parameter	T_{e}	ω_{e}	ω_{e}x_{e}	ω_{e}y_{e}	B_{e}	α_{e}	γ_{e}	D_{e}	β_{e}	r_{e}	ν_{00}	R_{e} Å	ref
H											112033.9		
G											110930.9		
F 0^{+}_{g}											108492.2		
E											107330		
D											106029.5		
C 0^{+}_{g}											95050.7		
B^{1}Σ_{u}^{+} 0^{+}_{g}											93241.26		
A^{3}Σ_{2u}^{+}1_{u}											92393.3		
X^{1}Σ_{g}^{+}		31.92	3.31	0.11	0.060	0.004		76.9				3.8	

==== Cation ====
Parameter	breakup	T_{e}	ω_{e}	ω_{e}x_{e}	ω_{e}y_{e}	B_{e}	α_{e}	γ_{e}	D_{e}	β_{e}	r_{e}	ν_{00}	R_{e} Å	ref
D^{2}Σ_{1/2u}^{+}	Ar^{1}S_{0} + Ar^{+2}P_{1/2}													
C^{2}Π_{1/2u}	Ar^{1}S_{0} + Ar^{+2}P_{1/2}	128 004	58.9	1.4					622 cm^{−1}					
B^{2}Π_{1/2g}	Ar^{1}S_{0} + Ar^{+2}P_{3/2}													
C^{2}Π_{3/2u}	Ar^{1}S_{0} + Ar^{+2}P_{3/2}	126884							311 cm^{−1}					
B^{2}Π_{3/2g}^{+}	Ar^{1}S_{0} + Ar^{+2}P_{3/2}								0.104 eV					
A^{2}Σ_{1/2u}^{+}	Ar^{1}S_{0} + Ar^{+2}P_{3/2}	116591	307.0	2.05					622 cm^{−1} ?1.361 eV					
