= Argon =

Argon, _{18}Ar
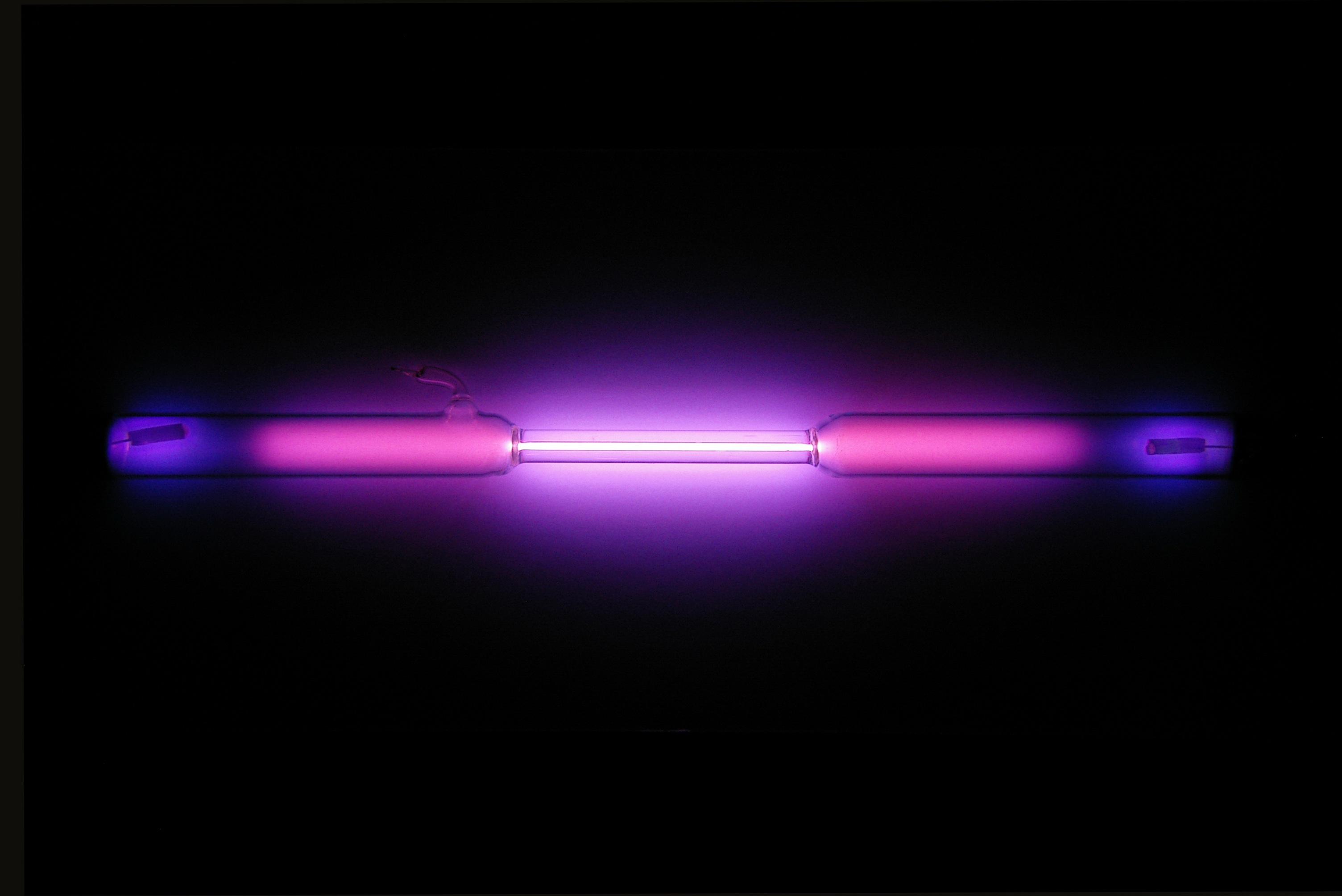

Argon
- Pronunciation: /ˈɑːrɡɒn/ (AR-gon)
- Appearance: colorless gas exhibiting a lilac/violet glow when placed in an electric field

Standard atomic weight A_{r}°(Ar)
- [39.792, 39.963]; 39.95±0.16 (abridged)

Argon in the periodic table
Hydrogen																															Helium
Lithium	Beryllium																									Boron	Carbon	Nitrogen	Oxygen	Fluorine	Neon
Sodium	Magnesium																									Aluminium	Silicon	Phosphorus	Sulfur	Chlorine	Argon
Potassium	Calcium															Scandium	Titanium	Vanadium	Chromium	Manganese	Iron	Cobalt	Nickel	Copper	Zinc	Gallium	Germanium	Arsenic	Selenium	Bromine	Krypton
Rubidium	Strontium															Yttrium	Zirconium	Niobium	Molybdenum	Technetium	Ruthenium	Rhodium	Palladium	Silver	Cadmium	Indium	Tin	Antimony	Tellurium	Iodine	Xenon
Caesium	Barium	Lanthanum	Cerium	Praseodymium	Neodymium	Promethium	Samarium	Europium	Gadolinium	Terbium	Dysprosium	Holmium	Erbium	Thulium	Ytterbium	Lutetium	Hafnium	Tantalum	Tungsten	Rhenium	Osmium	Iridium	Platinum	Gold	Mercury (element)	Thallium	Lead	Bismuth	Polonium	Astatine	Radon
Francium	Radium	Actinium	Thorium	Protactinium	Uranium	Neptunium	Plutonium	Americium	Curium	Berkelium	Californium	Einsteinium	Fermium	Mendelevium	Nobelium	Lawrencium	Rutherfordium	Dubnium	Seaborgium	Bohrium	Hassium	Meitnerium	Darmstadtium	Roentgenium	Copernicium	Nihonium	Flerovium	Moscovium	Livermorium	Tennessine	Oganesson
Ne
↑
Ar
↓
Kr
chlorine ← argon → potassium
- Atomic number (Z): 18
- Group: group 18 (noble gases)
- Period: period 3
- Block: p-block
- Electron configuration: [Ne] 3s^{2} 3p^{6}
- Electrons per shell: 2, 8, 8

Physical properties
- Phase at STP: gas
- Melting point: 83.81 K (−189.34 °C, −308.81 °F)
- Boiling point: 87.302 K (−185.848 °C, −302.526 °F)
- Density (at STP): 1.784 g/L
- when liquid (at b.p.): 1.3954 g/cm^{3}
- Triple point: 83.8058 K, 68.89 kPa
- Critical point: 150.687 K, 4.863 MPa
- Heat of fusion: 1.18 kJ/mol
- Heat of vaporization: 6.53 kJ/mol
- Molar heat capacity: 20.85 J/(mol·K)
- Specific heat capacity: 521.902 J/(kg·K)
Vapor pressure
P (Pa)	1	10	100	1 k	10 k	100 k
at T (K)		47	53	61	71	87

Atomic properties
- Oxidation states: common: (none); 0
- Electronegativity: Pauling scale: no data
- Ionization energies: 1st: 1520.6 kJ/mol; 2nd: 2665.8 kJ/mol; 3rd: 3931 kJ/mol; (more)
- Atomic radius: empirical: 31 pm
- Covalent radius: 106±10 pm
- Van der Waals radius: 188 pm
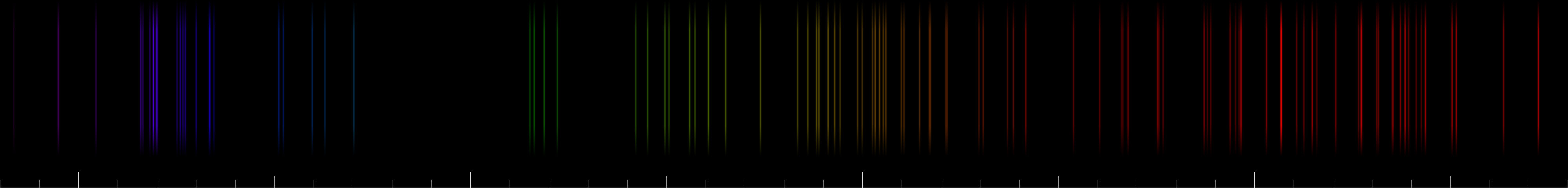
- Spectral lines of argon

Other properties
- Natural occurrence: primordial
- Crystal structure: face-centered cubic (fcc) (cF4)
- Lattice constant: a = 546.91 pm (at triple point)
- Thermal conductivity: 17.72×10^{−3} W/(m⋅K)
- Magnetic ordering: diamagnetic
- Molar magnetic susceptibility: −19.6×10^{−6} cm^{3}/mol
- Speed of sound: 323 m/s (gas, at 27 °C)
- CAS Number: 7440-37-1

History
- Naming: from the Greek ἀργόν, meaning 'lazy' or 'inactive', in reference to its inertness
- Discovery and first isolation: Lord Rayleigh and William Ramsay (1894)

Isotopes of argon
Main isotopes			Decay	
Isotope	abundance	half-life (t_{1/2})	mode	product
^{36}Ar	0.334%	stable		
^{37}Ar	trace	35.01 d	ε	^{37}Cl
^{38}Ar	0.063%	stable		
^{39}Ar	trace	302 y	β^{−}	^{39}K
^{40}Ar	99.604%	stable		
^{41}Ar	trace	109.61 min	β^{−}	^{41}K
^{42}Ar	synth	32.9 y	β^{−}	^{42}K

Argon is a chemical element; it has symbol Ar and atomic number 18. It is in group 18 of the periodic table and is a noble gas. Argon is the third most abundant gas in Earth's atmosphere, at 0.934% (9340 ppmv). It is more than twice as abundant as water vapor (which averages about 4000 ppmv, but varies greatly), 23 times as abundant as carbon dioxide (400 ppmv), and more than 500 times as abundant as neon (18 ppmv). Argon is the most abundant noble gas in Earth's crust, comprising 0.00015% of the crust.

Nearly all argon in Earth's atmosphere is radiogenic argon-40, derived from the decay of potassium-40 in Earth's crust. In the universe, argon-36 is by far the most common argon isotope, as it is the most easily produced by stellar nucleosynthesis in supernovas.

The name "argon" is derived from the Ancient Greek word ἀργόν, neuter singular form of ἀργός meaning 'lazy' or 'inactive', as a reference to the fact that the element undergoes almost no chemical reactions. The complete octet (eight electrons) in the outer atomic shell makes argon stable and resistant to bonding with other elements. Its triple point temperature of 83.8058 K is a defining fixed point in the International Temperature Scale of 1990.

Argon is extracted industrially by the fractional distillation of liquid air. It is mostly used as an inert shielding gas in welding and other high-temperature industrial processes where ordinarily unreactive substances become reactive; for example, an argon atmosphere is used in graphite electric furnaces to prevent the graphite from burning. It is also used in incandescent and fluorescent lighting, and other gas-discharge tubes. It makes a distinctive blue-green gas laser. It is also used in fluorescent glow starters.

== Characteristics ==
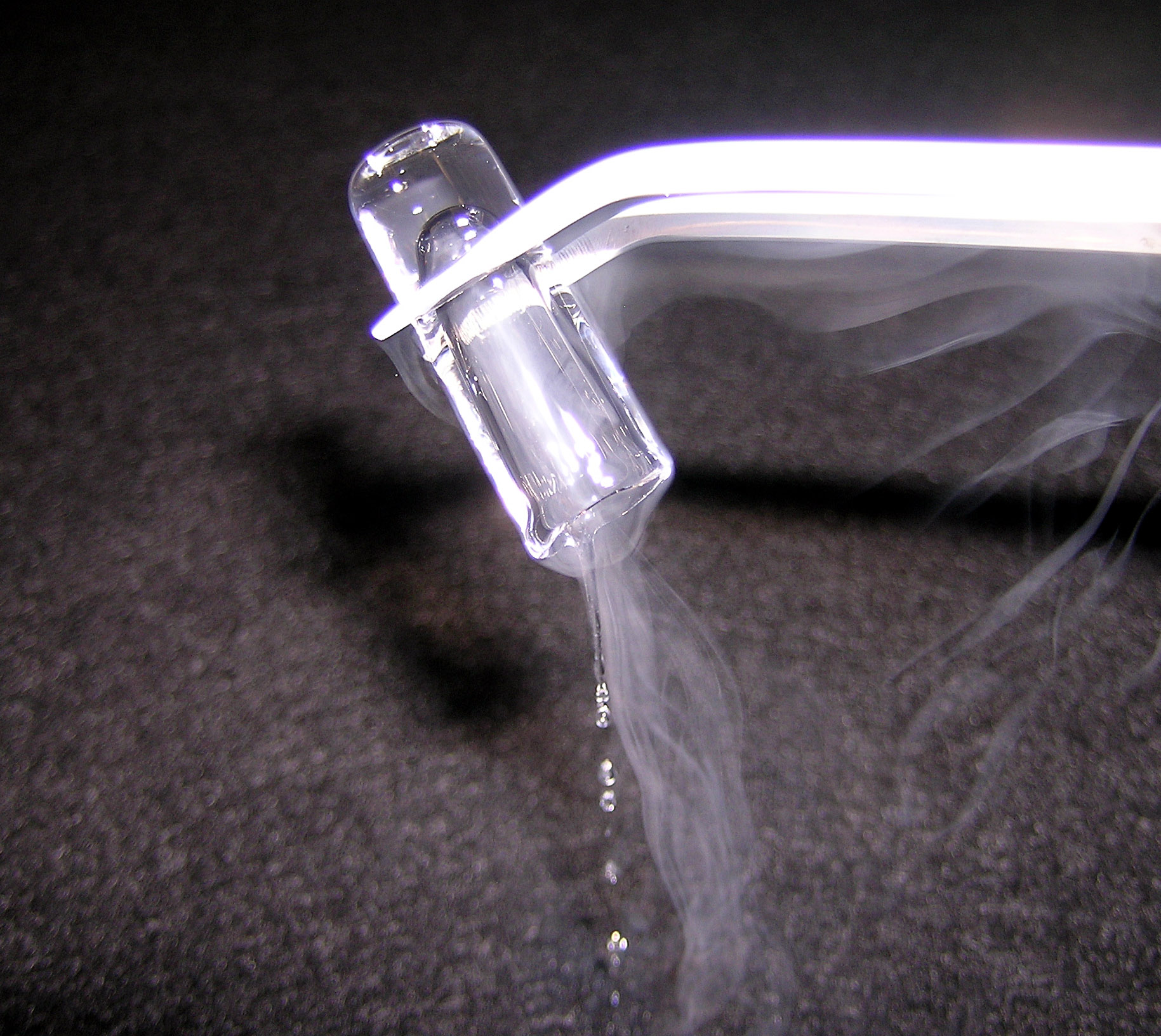
A small piece of rapidly melting solid argon

Argon has approximately the same solubility in water as oxygen and is 2.5 times more soluble in water than nitrogen. Argon is colorless, odorless, nonflammable and nontoxic as a solid, liquid or gas. Argon is chemically inert under most conditions and forms no confirmed stable compounds at room temperature.

Although argon is a noble gas, it can form some compounds under various extreme conditions. Argon fluorohydride (HArF), a compound of argon with fluorine and hydrogen that is stable below 17 K (−256.1 °C; −429.1 °F), has been demonstrated. Although the neutral ground-state chemical compounds of argon are presently limited to HArF, argon can form clathrates with water when atoms of argon are trapped in a lattice of water molecules. Ions, such as ArH^{+}, and excited-state complexes, such as ArF, have been demonstrated. Theoretical calculation predicts several more argon compounds that should be stable but have not yet been synthesized.

== History ==
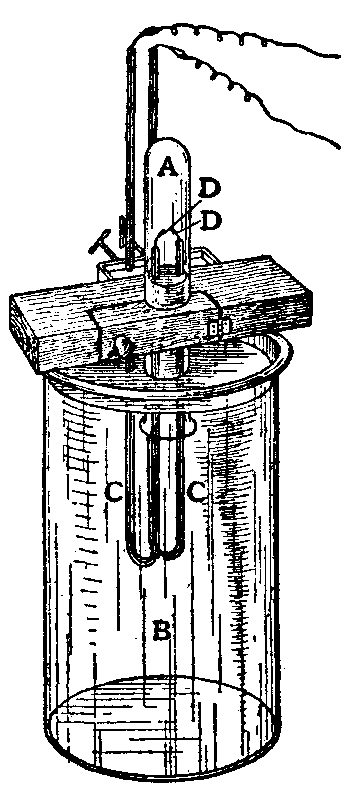
A: test-tube, B: dilute alkali, C: U-shaped glass tube, D: platinum electrode

Argon (Ancient Greek ἀργόν, neuter singular form of ἀργός meaning "lazy" or "inactive") is named in reference to its chemical inactivity. This chemical property of this first noble gas to be discovered impressed the namers. An unreactive gas was suspected to be a component of air by Henry Cavendish in 1785.

Argon was first isolated from air in 1894 by Lord Rayleigh and Sir William Ramsay at University College London by removing oxygen, carbon dioxide, water, and nitrogen from a sample of clean air. They first accomplished this by replicating an experiment of Henry Cavendish's. They trapped a mixture of atmospheric air with additional oxygen in a test-tube (A) upside-down over a large quantity of dilute alkali solution (B), which in Cavendish's original experiment was potassium hydroxide, and conveyed a current through wires insulated by U-shaped glass tubes (CC) which sealed around the platinum wire electrodes, leaving the ends of the wires (DD) exposed to the gas and insulated from the alkali solution. The arc was powered by a battery of five Grove cells and a Ruhmkorff coil of medium size. The alkali absorbed the oxides of nitrogen produced by the arc and also carbon dioxide. They operated the arc until no more reduction of volume of the gas could be seen for at least an hour or two and the spectral lines of nitrogen disappeared when the gas was examined. The remaining oxygen was reacted with alkaline pyrogallate to leave behind an apparently non-reactive gas which they called argon.

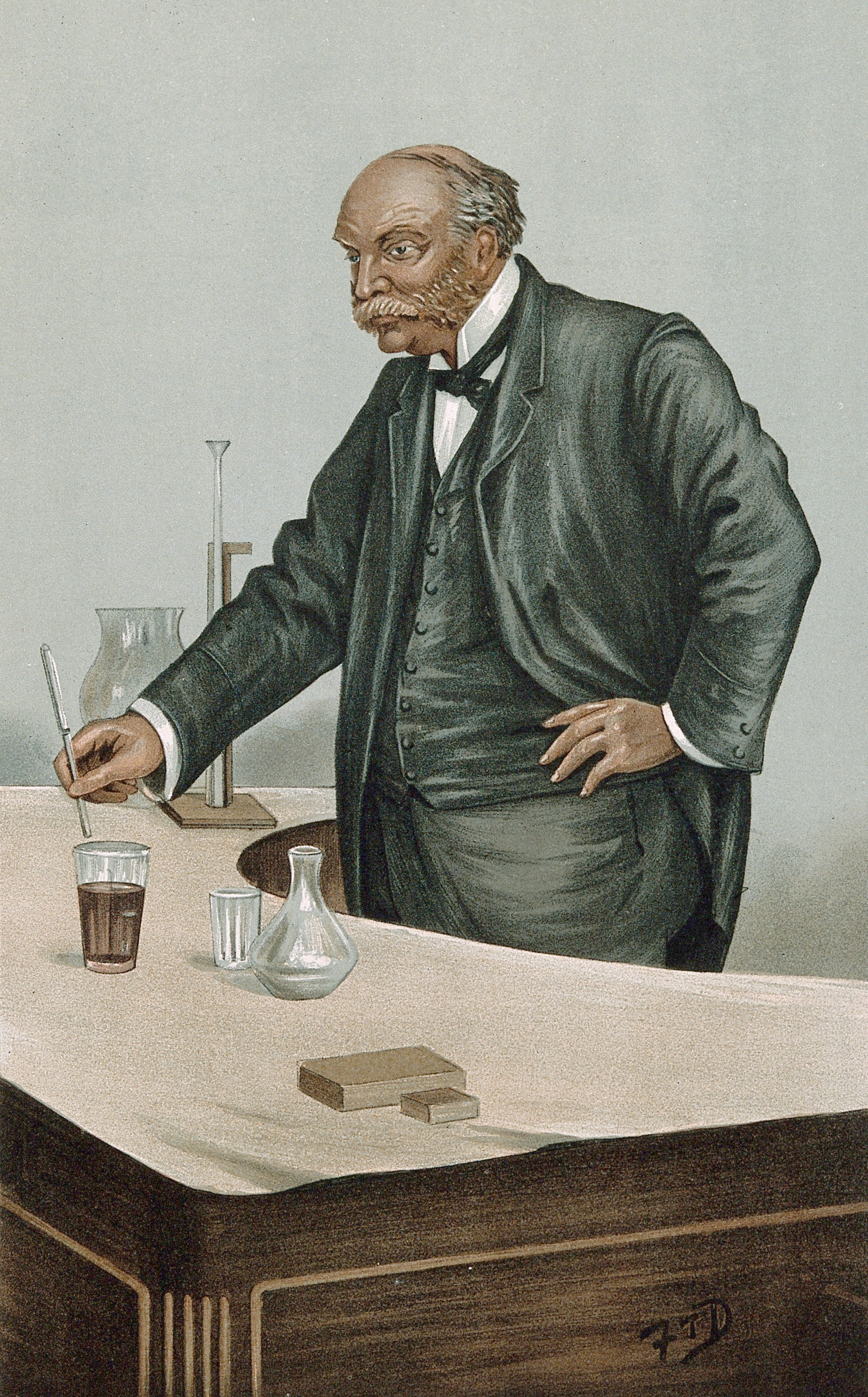
Captioned "Argon", caricature of Lord Rayleigh in Vanity Fair, 1899

Before isolating the gas, they had determined that nitrogen produced from chemical compounds was 0.5% lighter than nitrogen from the atmosphere. The difference was slight, but it was important enough to attract their attention for many months. They concluded that there was another gas in the air mixed in with the nitrogen. Argon was also encountered in 1882 through independent research of H. F. Newall and W. N. Hartley. Each observed new lines in the emission spectrum of air that did not match known elements.

Prior to 1957, the symbol for argon was "A". This was changed to Ar after the International Union of Pure and Applied Chemistry published the work Nomenclature of Inorganic Chemistry in 1957.

== Occurrence ==
Argon constitutes 0.934% by volume and 1.288% by mass of Earth's atmosphere. Air is the primary industrial source of purified argon products. Argon is isolated from air by fractionation, most commonly by cryogenic fractional distillation, a process that also produces purified nitrogen, oxygen, neon, krypton and xenon. Earth's crust and seawater contain 1.2 ppm and 0.45 ppm of argon, respectively.

== Isotopes ==
The main isotopes of argon found on Earth are ^{40}Ar (99.6%), ^{36}Ar (0.34%), and ^{38}Ar (0.06%). Naturally occurring ^{40}K, with a half-life of 1.25×10^{9} years, decays to stable ^{40}Ar (11.2%) by electron capture or positron emission, and also to stable ^{40}Ca (88.8%) by beta decay. These properties and ratios are used to determine the age of rocks by K–Ar dating.

In Earth's atmosphere, ^{39}Ar is made by cosmic ray activity, primarily by neutron capture of ^{40}Ar followed by two-neutron emission. In the subsurface environment, it is also produced through neutron capture by ^{39}K, followed by proton emission. ^{37}Ar is created from the neutron capture by ^{40}Ca followed by an alpha particle emission as a result of subsurface nuclear explosions. It has a half-life of 35 days.

Between locations in the Solar System, the isotopic composition of argon varies greatly. Where the major source of argon is the decay of ^{40}K in rocks, ^{40}Ar will be the dominant isotope, as it is on Earth. Argon produced directly by stellar nucleosynthesis is dominated by the alpha-process nuclide ^{36}Ar. Correspondingly, solar argon contains 84.6% ^{36}Ar (according to solar wind measurements), and the ratio of the three isotopes ^{36}Ar : ^{38}Ar : ^{40}Ar in the atmospheres of the outer planets is 8400 : 1600 : 1. This contrasts with the low abundance of primordial ^{36}Ar in Earth's atmosphere, which is only 31.5 ppmv (= 9340 ppmv × 0.337%), comparable with that of neon (18.18 ppmv) on Earth and with interplanetary gasses, measured by probes.

The atmospheres of Mars, Mercury and Titan (the largest moon of Saturn) contain argon, predominantly as ^{40}Ar.

The predominance of radiogenic ^{40}Ar is the reason the standard atomic weight of terrestrial argon is greater than that of the next element, potassium, a fact that was puzzling when argon was discovered. Mendeleev positioned the elements on his periodic table in order of atomic weight, but the inertness of argon suggested a placement before the reactive alkali metal. Henry Moseley later solved this problem by showing that the periodic table is actually arranged in order of atomic number (see History of the periodic table).

== Compounds ==
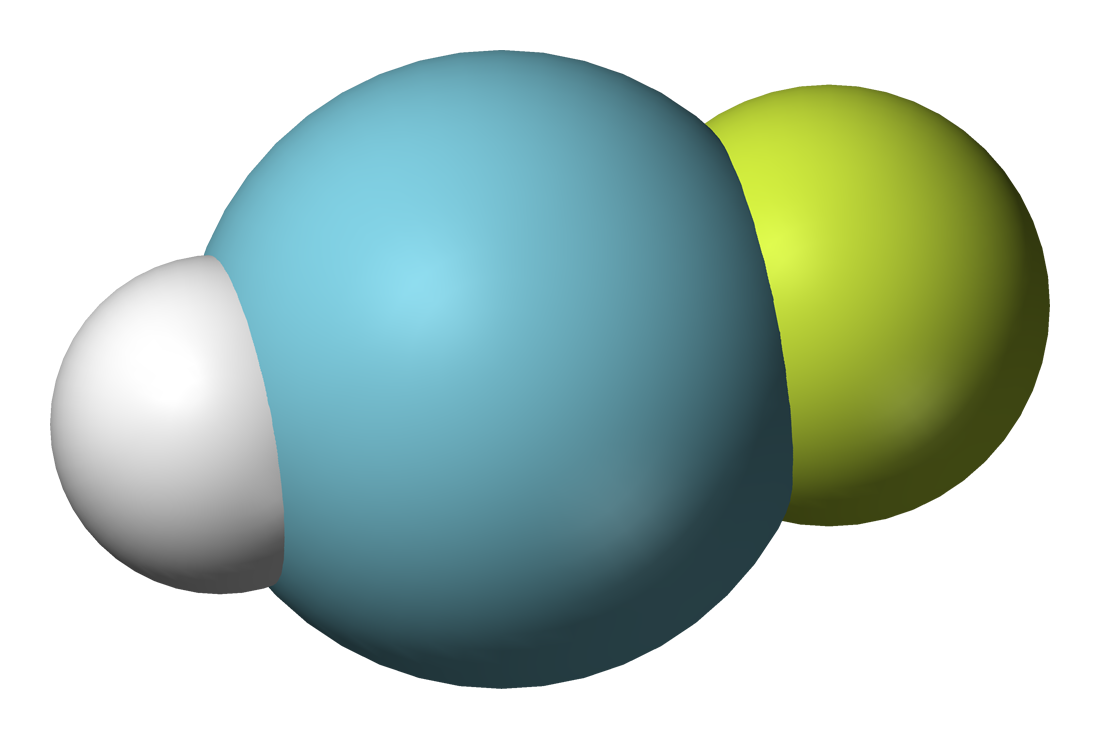
Space-filling model of argon fluorohydride

Argon's complete octet of electrons indicates full s and p subshells. This full valence shell makes argon very stable and extremely resistant to bonding with other elements. Before 1962, argon and the other noble gases were considered to be chemically inert and unable to form compounds; however, compounds of the heavier noble gases have since been synthesized. The first argon compound with tungsten pentacarbonyl, W(CO)_{5}Ar, was isolated in 1975. However, it was not widely recognised at that time. In August 2000, another argon compound, argon fluorohydride (HArF), was formed by researchers at the University of Helsinki, by shining ultraviolet light onto frozen argon containing a small amount of hydrogen fluoride with caesium iodide. This discovery caused the recognition that argon could form weakly bound compounds, even though it was not the first. It is stable up to 17 kelvins (−256 °C). The metastable ArCF^{2+}_{2} dication, which is valence-isoelectronic with carbonyl fluoride and phosgene, was observed in 2010. Argon-36, in the form of argon hydride (argonium) ions, has been detected in interstellar medium associated with the Crab Nebula supernova; this was the first noble-gas molecule detected in outer space.

Solid argon hydride (Ar(H_{2})_{2}) has the same crystal structure as the MgZn_{2} Laves phase. It forms at pressures between 4.3 and 220 GPa, though Raman measurements suggest that the H_{2} molecules in Ar(H_{2})_{2} dissociate above 175 GPa.

== Production ==
Argon is extracted industrially by the fractional distillation of liquid air in a cryogenic air separation unit; a process that separates liquid nitrogen, which boils at 77.3 K, from argon, which boils at 87.3 K, and liquid oxygen, which boils at 90.2 K. About 700,000 tonnes of argon are produced worldwide every year.

== Applications ==
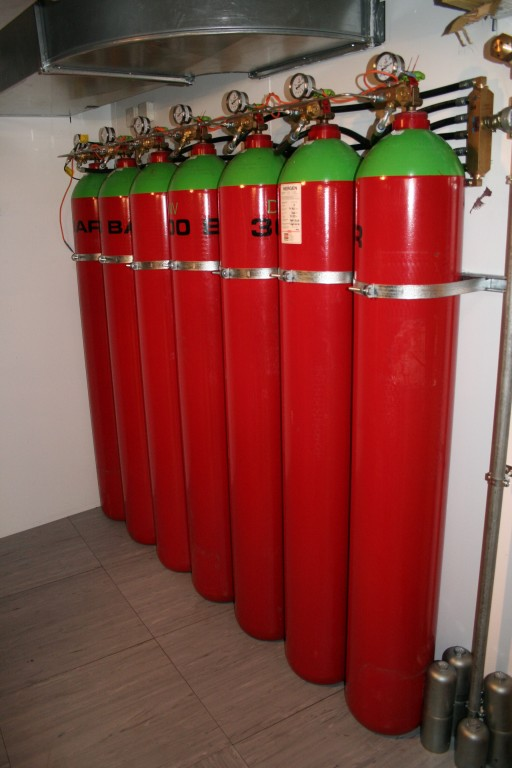
Cylinders containing argon gas for use in extinguishing fire without damaging server equipment

Argon has several desirable properties:

- Argon is a chemically inert gas.
- Argon is the cheapest alternative when nitrogen is not sufficiently inert.
- Argon has low thermal conductivity.
- Argon has electronic properties (ionization and/or the emission spectrum) desirable for some applications.

Other noble gases would be equally suitable for most of these applications, but argon is by far the cheapest. It is inexpensive, since it occurs naturally in air and is readily obtained as a byproduct of cryogenic air separation in the production of liquid oxygen and liquid nitrogen: the primary constituents of air are used on a large industrial scale. The other noble gases (except helium) are produced this way as well, but argon is the most plentiful by far. The bulk of its applications arise simply because it is inert and relatively cheap.

=== Industrial processes ===
Argon is used in some high-temperature industrial processes where ordinarily non-reactive substances become reactive. For example, an argon atmosphere is used in graphite electric furnaces to prevent the graphite from burning.

For some of these processes, the presence of nitrogen or oxygen gases might cause defects within the material. Argon is used in some types of arc welding such as gas metal arc welding and gas tungsten arc welding, as well as in the processing of titanium and other reactive elements. An argon atmosphere is also used for growing crystals of silicon and germanium.

Argon is used in the poultry industry to asphyxiate birds, either for mass culling following disease outbreaks, or as a means of slaughter more humane than electric stunning. Argon is denser than air and displaces oxygen close to the ground during inert gas asphyxiation. Its non-reactive nature makes it suitable in a food product, and since it replaces oxygen within the dead bird, argon also enhances shelf life.

Argon is sometimes used for extinguishing fires where valuable equipment may be damaged by water or foam.

=== Scientific research ===
Liquid argon is used as the target for neutrino experiments and direct dark matter searches. The interaction between the hypothetical WIMPs and an argon nucleus produces scintillation light that is detected by photomultiplier tubes. Two-phase detectors containing argon gas are used to detect the ionized electrons produced during the WIMP–nucleus scattering. As with most other liquefied noble gases, argon has a high scintillation light yield (about 51 photons/keV), is transparent to its own scintillation light, and is relatively easy to purify. Compared to xenon, argon is cheaper and has a distinct scintillation time profile, which allows the separation of electronic recoils from nuclear recoils. On the other hand, its intrinsic beta-ray background is larger due to ^{39}Ar contamination, unless one uses argon from underground sources, which has much less ^{39}Ar contamination. Most of the argon in Earth's atmosphere was produced by electron capture of long-lived ^{40}K (^{40}K + e^{−} → ^{40}Ar + ν) present in natural potassium within Earth. The ^{39}Ar activity in the atmosphere is maintained by cosmogenic production through the knockout reaction ^{40}Ar(n,2n)^{39}Ar and similar reactions. The half-life of ^{39}Ar is only 269 years. As a result, the underground Ar, shielded by rock and water, has much less ^{39}Ar contamination. Dark-matter detectors currently operating with liquid argon include DarkSide, WArP, ArDM, microCLEAN and DEAP. Neutrino experiments include ICARUS and MicroBooNE, both of which use high-purity liquid argon in a time projection chamber for fine grained three-dimensional imaging of neutrino interactions.

At Linköping University, Sweden, the inert gas is being utilized in a vacuum chamber in which plasma is introduced to ionize metallic films. This process results in a film usable for manufacturing computer processors. The new process would eliminate the need for chemical baths and use of expensive, dangerous and rare materials.

=== Preservative ===
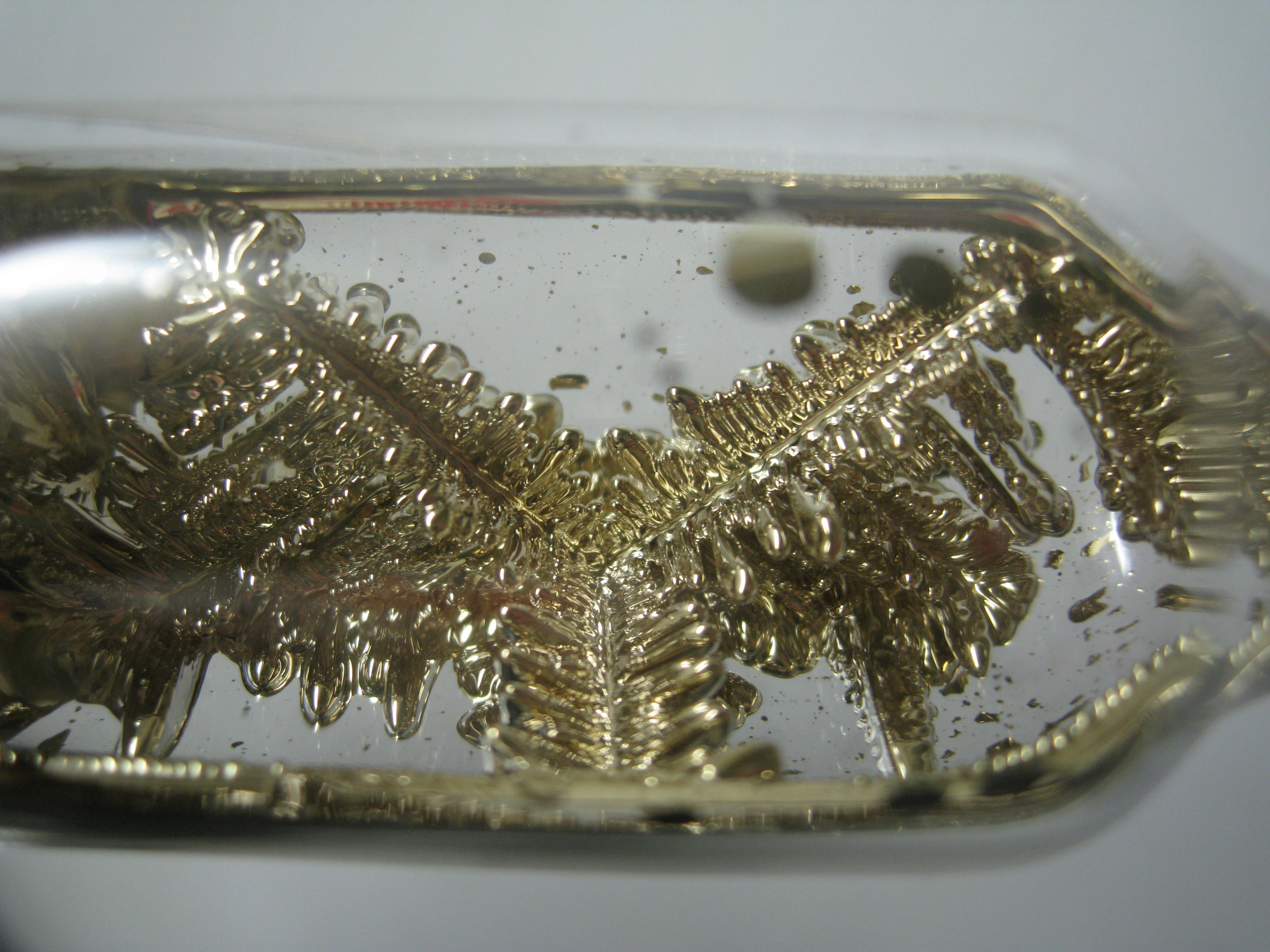
A sample of caesium is packed under argon to avoid reactions with air

Argon is used to displace oxygen- and moisture-containing air in packaging material to extend the shelf-lives of the contents (argon has the European food additive code E938). Aerial oxidation, hydrolysis, and other chemical reactions that degrade the products are retarded or prevented entirely. High-purity chemicals and pharmaceuticals are sometimes packed and sealed in argon.

In winemaking, argon is used in a variety of activities to provide a barrier against oxygen at the liquid surface, which can spoil wine by fueling both microbial metabolism (as with acetic acid bacteria) and standard redox chemistry.

Argon is sometimes used as the propellant in aerosol cans.

Argon is also used as a preservative for such products as varnish, polyurethane, and paint, by displacing air to prepare a container for storage.

Since 2002, the American National Archives stores important national documents such as the Declaration of Independence and the Constitution within argon-filled cases to inhibit their degradation. Argon is preferable to the helium that had been used in the preceding five decades, because helium gas escapes through the intermolecular pores in most containers and must be regularly replaced.

=== Laboratory equipment ===
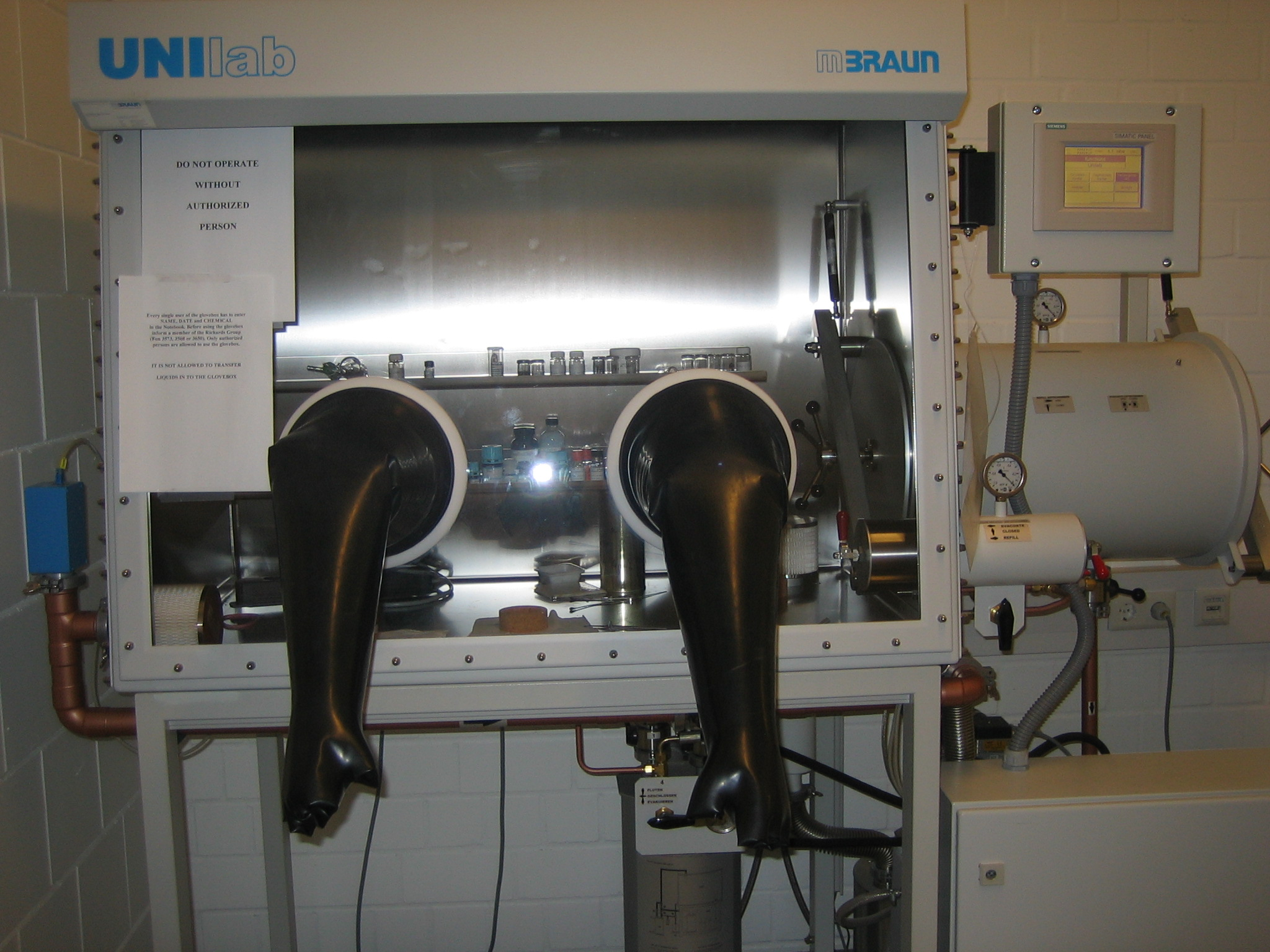
Gloveboxes are often filled with argon, which recirculates over scrubbers to maintain an oxygen-, nitrogen-, and moisture-free atmosphere

Argon may be used as the inert gas within Schlenk lines and gloveboxes. Argon is preferred to less expensive nitrogen in cases where nitrogen may react with the reagents or apparatus.

Argon may be used as the carrier gas in gas chromatography and in electrospray ionization mass spectrometry; it is the gas of choice for the plasma used in ICP spectroscopy. Argon is preferred for the sputter coating of specimens for scanning electron microscopy. Argon gas is also commonly used for sputter deposition of thin films as in microelectronics and for wafer cleaning in microfabrication.

=== Medical use ===
Cryosurgery procedures such as cryoablation use liquid argon to destroy tissue such as cancer cells. It is used in a procedure called "argon-enhanced coagulation", a form of argon plasma beam electrosurgery. The procedure carries a risk of producing gas embolism and has resulted in the death of at least one patient.

Blue argon lasers are used in surgery to weld arteries, destroy tumors, and correct eye defects.

Argon has also been used experimentally to replace nitrogen in the breathing or decompression mix known as Argox, to speed the elimination of dissolved nitrogen from the blood.

=== Lighting ===
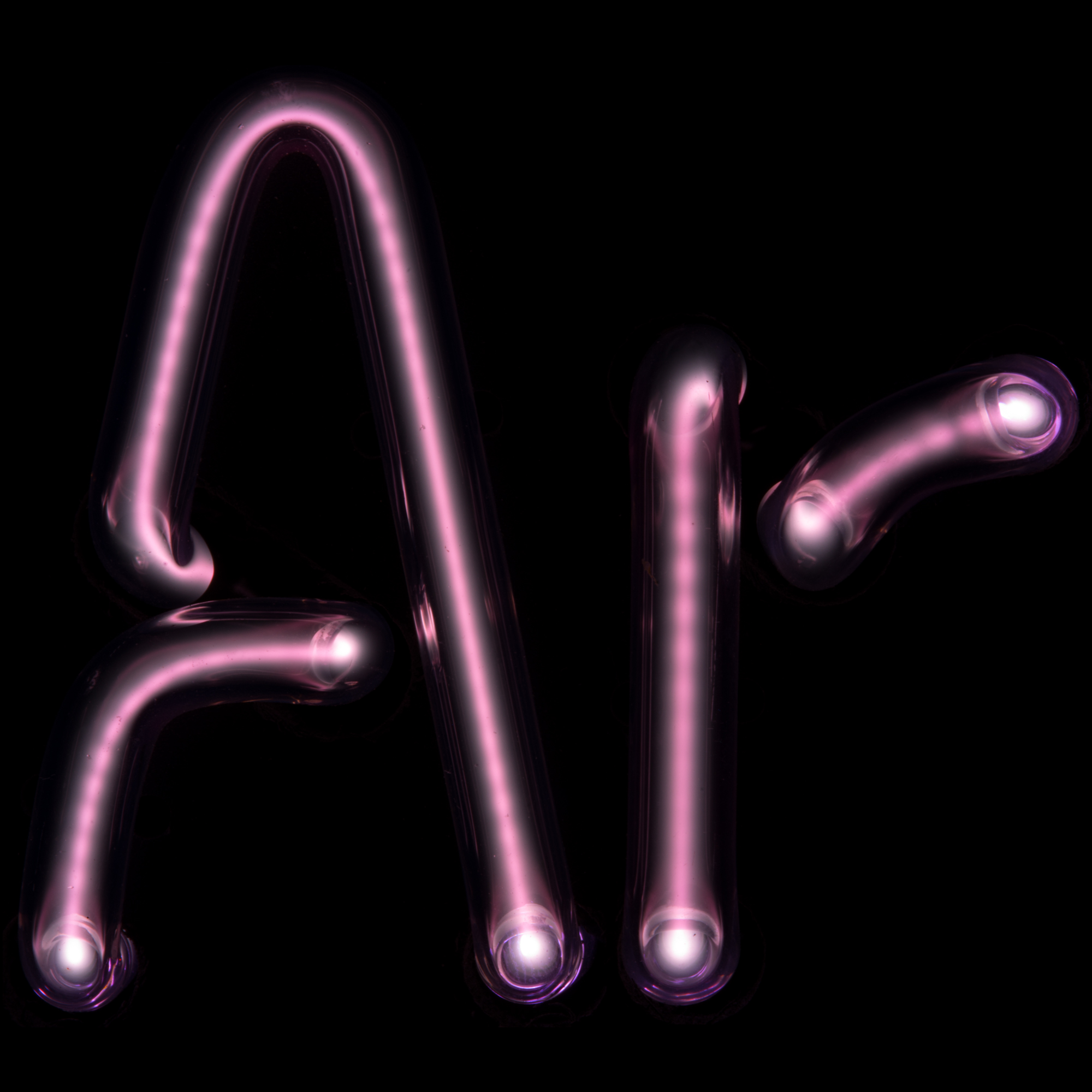
Argon gas-discharge lamp forming "Ar", the symbol for argon

Incandescent lights are filled with argon, to preserve the filaments at high temperature from oxidation. It is used for the specific way it ionizes and emits light, such as in plasma globes and calorimetry in experimental particle physics. Gas-discharge lamps filled with pure argon provide lilac/violet light; with argon and some mercury, blue light. Argon is also used for blue and green argon-ion lasers.

=== Miscellaneous uses ===
Argon is used for thermal insulation in energy-efficient windows. Argon is also used in technical scuba diving to inflate a dry suit because it is inert and has low thermal conductivity.

Argon is used as a propellant in the development of the Variable Specific Impulse Magnetoplasma Rocket (VASIMR). Compressed argon gas is allowed to expand, to cool the seeker heads of some versions of the AIM-9 Sidewinder missile and other missiles that use cooled thermal seeker heads. The gas is stored at high pressure.

Argon-39, with a half-life of 269 years, has been used for a number of applications, primarily ice core and ground water dating. Also, potassium–argon dating and related argon-argon dating are used to date sedimentary, metamorphic, and igneous rocks.

Argon has been used by athletes as a doping agent to simulate hypoxic conditions. In 2014, the World Anti-Doping Agency (WADA) added argon and xenon to the list of prohibited substances and methods, although at this time there is no reliable test for abuse.

== Safety ==
Although argon is non-toxic, it is 38% more dense than air and therefore considered a dangerous asphyxiant in closed areas. It is difficult to detect because it is colorless, odorless, and tasteless. A 1994 incident, in which a man was asphyxiated after entering an argon-filled section of oil pipe under construction in Alaska, highlights the dangers of argon tank leakage in confined spaces and emphasizes the need for proper use, storage and handling.

== See also ==
- Industrial gas
- Oxygen–argon ratio, a ratio of two physically similar gases, which has importance in various sectors.
