= English River =

English River may refer to:

== Rivers ==
- English River (Ontario), a tributary of the Winnipeg River in Northwestern Ontario, Canada
- English River (Chateauguay River tributary), flowing from New York State, United States, into Quebec, Canada
- English River (Iowa), a tributary of the Iowa River in southeastern Iowa in the United States
- Rivière aux Anglais (English's River), a tributary of the St. Lawrence River in Quebec, Canada

== Places ==
=== Canada ===
- English River, Ontario, an unincorporated place in Northwestern Ontario, Canada
- English River 21, Indian Reserve in Kenora District, Ontario, Canada
- English River 66, Indian Reserve in Cochrane District, Ontario, Canada
- English River 192H, Indian Reserve on an island in Porter Lake, Saskatchewan, Canada

=== United States ===
- English River Township, Keokuk County, Iowa, a township in Iowa, United States
- English River Township, Washington County, Iowa, a township in Iowa, United States

=== Other ===
- English River, Seychelles, an administrative district of Seychelles on the island of Mahé

== Other uses ==
- English River (ship), a Canadian lake freighter
- English River First Nation, a Dene First Nation band government in Patuanak, Saskatchewan, Canada

== See also ==
- English River Formation, a geological formation in Illinois, United States
