= List of fossiliferous stratigraphic units in Illinois =

This article contains a list of fossil-bearing stratigraphic units in the state of Illinois, U.S.

== Sites ==
Group or Formation	Period	Notes
Altamont Formation	Carboniferous	
Platteville Limestone	Ordovician	
St. Louis Limestone	Carboniferous	
Brainard Formation	Ordovician	
Carbondale Formation	Carboniferous	
Caseyville Formation	Carboniferous	
Cedar Valley Formation	Devonian	
Little Cedar Formation	Devonian	
Chester Formation	Carboniferous	
Hardinsburg Formation	Carboniferous	
Clore Formation	Carboniferous	
Tar Springs Formation	Carboniferous	
Chouteau Formation	Carboniferous	
Clayton Formation	Paleogene	
Decorah Shale	Ordovician	
Degonia Formation	Carboniferous	
Des Moines Formation	Carboniferous	
Drurey Shale	Carboniferous	
English River Formation	Carboniferous	
Fort Scott Limestone	Carboniferous	
Fraileys Formation	Carboniferous	
Fraileys Shale	Carboniferous	
Galena Dolomite	Ordovician	
Dubuque Formation	Ordovician	
Dunleith Formation	Ordovician	
Guttenberg Formation	Ordovician	
Ion Formation	Ordovician	
Wise Lake Formation	Ordovician	
Glen Park Formation	Carboniferous	
Glenwood Formation	Ordovician	
Golconda Formation	Carboniferous	
Golconda Group	Carboniferous	
Haney Formation	Carboniferous	
Gower Formation	Silurian	
Grand Detour Formation	Ordovician	
Grand Tower Limestone	Devonian	
Haney Limestone	Carboniferous	
Iola Formation	Carboniferous	
Kansas City Formation	Carboniferous	
Keokuk Limestone	Carboniferous	
Spoon Formation	Carboniferous	
Kimmswick Limestone	Ordovician	
Kinkaid Formation	Carboniferous	
Linton Formation	Carboniferous	
Maquoketa Formation	Ordovician	
Brainard Shale	Ordovician	
Fort Atkinson Limestone	Ordovician	
Neda Formation	Ordovician	
Scales Shale	Ordovician	
Mattoon Formation	Carboniferous	
McCraney Limestone	Carboniferous	
Bond Formation	Carboniferous	
Patoka Formation	Carboniferous	
Shelburn Formation	Carboniferous	
McLeansbough Formation	Carboniferous	
Mifflin Formation	Ordovician	
Mosalem Formation	Silurian	
Nachusa Formation	Ordovician	
Glen Dean Formation	Carboniferous	
Orchard Creek Shale	Ordovician	
Paint Creek Formation	Carboniferous	
Pawnee Formation	Carboniferous	
Pecatonica Formation	Ordovician	
McGregor Formation	Ordovician	
Prosser Limestone	Ordovician	
Purington Shale	Carboniferous	
Quimbys Mill Formation	Ordovician	
Racine Dolomite	Silurian	
Ridenhower Formation	Carboniferous	
Salem Formation	Carboniferous	
Shakopee Formation	Ordovician	
Spechts Ferry Formation	Ordovician	
St. Laurent Formation	Devonian	
St. Louis Formation	Carboniferous	
St. Peter Sandstone	Ordovician	
Ste. Genevieve Limestone	Carboniferous	
Sturgis Formation	Carboniferous	
Sugar Run Dolomite	Silurian	
Tradewater Formation	Carboniferous	
Verdigris Formation	Carboniferous	
Waltersburg Formation	Carboniferous	
Warsaw Formation	Carboniferous	
Wilhelmi Formation	Silurian	

== See also ==
- Paleontology in Illinois
