= Wilhelmi =

Wilhelmi may refer to:

== People ==
=== Surname ===
- Arthur Wilhelmi (born 1968), American politician
- Carl Wilhelmi (1829–1884), Dresden born seedsman
- Erin Wilhelmi, American actress
- Hans Wilhelmi (1899–1970), German politician
- Roman Wilhelmi (1936–1991), Polish actor

=== Given name ===
- Wilhelmi Malmivaara (1854–1922), clergyman

== Other uses ==
- Wilhelmi Formation, a geologic formation in Illinois
