= Superelectrophilic anion =

Negative ion that accepts electrons

Figure 1: Sphere-rod model (boron cage framework (B) shown in pink and substituents (X = halogens, CN) shown in gray).

Superelectrophilic anions are a class of molecular ions that exhibit highly electrophilic reaction behavior despite their overall negative charge. Thus, they are even able to bind the unreactive noble gases or molecular nitrogen at room temperature. The only representatives known so far are the fragment ions of the type (B_{12}X_{11})^{−} derived from the closo-dodecaborate dianions (B_{12}X_{12})^{2−}. X represents a substituent connected to a boron atom (cf. Fig. 1). For this reason, the following article deals exclusively with superelectrophilic anions of this type.

== Overview ==
Figure 2: The closo-dodecaborate dianion (B_{12}X_{12})^{2−} fragments and the superelectrophilic anion (B_{12}X_{11})^{−} is formed. The molecular ions are represented by structural formulas.

Anions are negatively charged ions and therefore usually exhibit nucleophilic reaction behavior. However, it has been shown that there are anions which behave in a strongly electrophilic manner despite their negative charge. This means that they form bonds with reaction partners in chemical reactions by accepting electron density from them. Their affinity for electrons is so great that they are even able to bind very unreactive small molecules such as nitrogen (N_{2}) or noble gas atoms at room temperature. For this reason, they are called "superelectrophilic anions". Furthermore, these superelectrophilic anions allow the direct reaction with small alkanes such as methane. Reactions with other anions are also possible and lead to the formation of highly charged ions.

The only superelectrophilic anions known so far are the fragment ions with the molecular formula (B_{12}X_{11})^{−}, which can be generated from the closo-dodecaborate dianions (B_{12}X_{12})^{2−}. The X represents a substituent connected to a boron atom, e.g. Cl or Br.

Due to their high reactivity, these fragment ions can so far only be generated in the evacuated gas phase of a mass spectrometer. Therefore, reactions of this class of compounds have been studied mainly in the gas phase. In the condensed phase, reaction products of the superelectrophilic anions were synthesized in small amounts using the ion soft-landing method.

Potential applications of this research include the preparation of exotic compounds (e.g., noble gas compounds) of interest for fundamental chemical research. If syntheses with superelectrophilic anions would become possible on a larger scale, they might be used for applications, for example the development of cancer drugs for the Boron Neutron Capture Therapy (BNCT).

== Origin of the concept ==
Originally, the term superelectrophilic was used exclusively for dications.

It was introduced by George A. Olah when he discovered that certain electrophilic monocations can be activated in the condensed phase by the presence of particularly strong acids – the so-called superacids. This makes these cations significantly more reactive than they are under normal conditions. He attributed this increased reactivity to the formation of doubly positively charged dications, which he termed "superelectrophilic."

Later, the term superelectrophilic was also frequently applied in gas phase studies to highly reactive dications that can bind noble gases at room temperature. Noble gases are generally considered to be particularly inert – in order to form a stable bond with a noble gas atom, a pair of electrons must be abstracted from it. Only the strongest electrophiles are able to do this, and these are usually dications or, more rarely, monocations, since high electrophilicity is accompanied by a substantial lack of electrons. In contrast, it is impossible for nucleophiles, which provide electrons for bond formation, to bind a noble gas strongly, because noble gases have negative electron affinities. Only weak interactions (ion-induced dipole and dispersion) are usually present, and do not result in a stable bond at room temperature.

Since anions are negatively charged and formally have an electron excess, they generally exhibit nucleophilic reaction behavior and should therefore not be able to form stable bonds to noble gas atoms. However, in direct contrast to this intuitive concept, it was shown in 2017 that the negatively charged gas-phase fragment anion (B_{12}Cl_{11})^{−} can bind the noble gases krypton and xenon at room temperature and thus, must be strongly electrophilic. Furthermore, the electrophilicity of this fragment anion could even be increased by exchanging the chlorine atoms (Cl) with cyano groups (CN). The resulting (B_{12}(CN)_{11})^{−} anion also spontaneously binds the particularly unreactive noble gas argon at room temperature and neon up to a maximum temperature of 50 Kelvin. Thus, it is the most electrophilic anion known to date.

Even though anions cannot formally fulfill the concept of superelectrophilic published by Olah (which only refers to cations), these particular anions exhibit reactivity that strongly resembles that of superelectrophilic dications in the gas phase. Thus, the term superelectrophilic anions was used.

Figure 3: Dome model of closo-dodecaborate dianion (B_{12}X_{12})^{2−}. (Volume filled to molecular surface, color scheme as in Figure 1).

== Precursors ==
The superelectrophilic anions (B_{12}X_{11})^{−} can be generated from the very stable closo-dodecaborate dianions (B_{12}X_{12})^{2−} by fragmentation in the gas phase.

The closo-dodecaborate dianions, which serve as precursors, consist of twelve boron atoms arranged in a highly symmetrical, cage-like closo structure. All twelve boron atoms carry a substituent (e.g. a halogen atom), which together form the outer shell of the ion (see Fig. 3).

Due to their three-dimensional σ-aromatic structure, closo-dodecaborate dianions are remarkably stable compounds and can be used to stabilize reactive cations (cf. weakly coordinating anions).

(B_{12}X_{12})^{2−} ions with the halogens (F, Cl, Br, I) or cyano groups (CN) as substituents (X) have been used as precursors for superelectrophilic anions so far.

== Generation ==
To generate the superelectrophilic anions from the closo-dodecaborate dianions (B_{12}X_{12})^{2−}, fragmentation is carried out in the mass spectrometer using collision-induced dissociation (CID). In this process, a substituent (X^{−}) is cleaved from the dianion precursor. As a result, only eleven of the twelve boron atoms carry a substituent. One boron atom, on the other hand, is vacant and possesses a free binding site (cf. Figures 1 and 4).

Depending on the nature of the substituents, this fragmentation can either occur directly by CID of the precursor (B_{12}X_{12})^{2−}, or by fragmentation of a so-called anionic ion pair M^{+}(B_{12}X_{12})^{2−}, which loses the neutral particle MX using CID. The cation M^{+} can be, for example, an H^{+} ion or an alkali cation. Direct fragmentation of the precursor is possible for the chlorine, bromine, and iodine variants (X = Cl, Br, I), while generation of the anionic ion pair is required for the precursor variants with fluorine and cyano groups as substituents (X = F, CN).

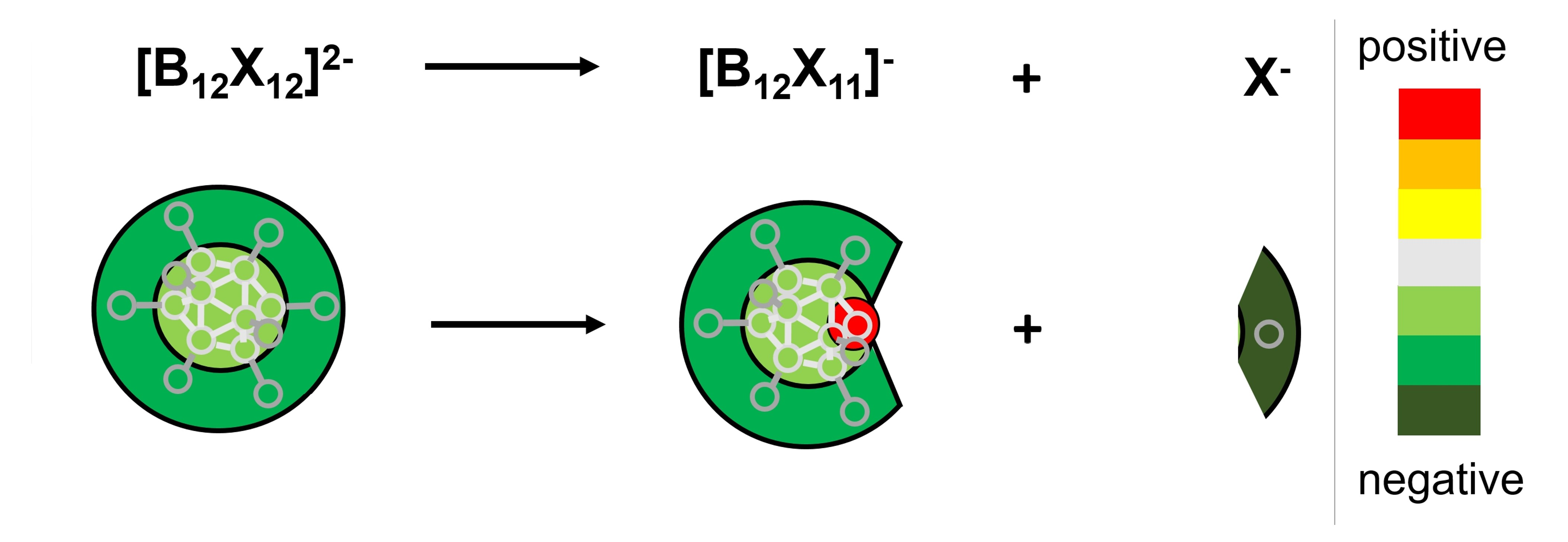
Figure 4: Fragmentation reaction in which the electrophilic anion (B_{12}X_{11})^{−} is formed. The differently charged regions in the reactant and product are shown in color. Note: The coloring is for illustrative purposes and is neither quantitative nor linear.

== Characteristics ==
The vacant bonding site on one of the boron atoms created during fragmentation carries a substantial partial positive charge and is therefore strongly electrophilic, although the overall charge of the ion is negative (cf. Fig. 4). At this vacant boron atom, the lowest unoccupied molecular orbital (LUMO) with negative orbital energy is located and the delocalized σ-electron system is interrupted, as shown by Electron Localization Index (ELI) studies.

The stiff and very stable dodecaborate framework prevents possible intramolecular rearrangement reactions, so that the highly reactive electrophilic center remains intact and chemically accessible.

== Reactivity and bond formation ==
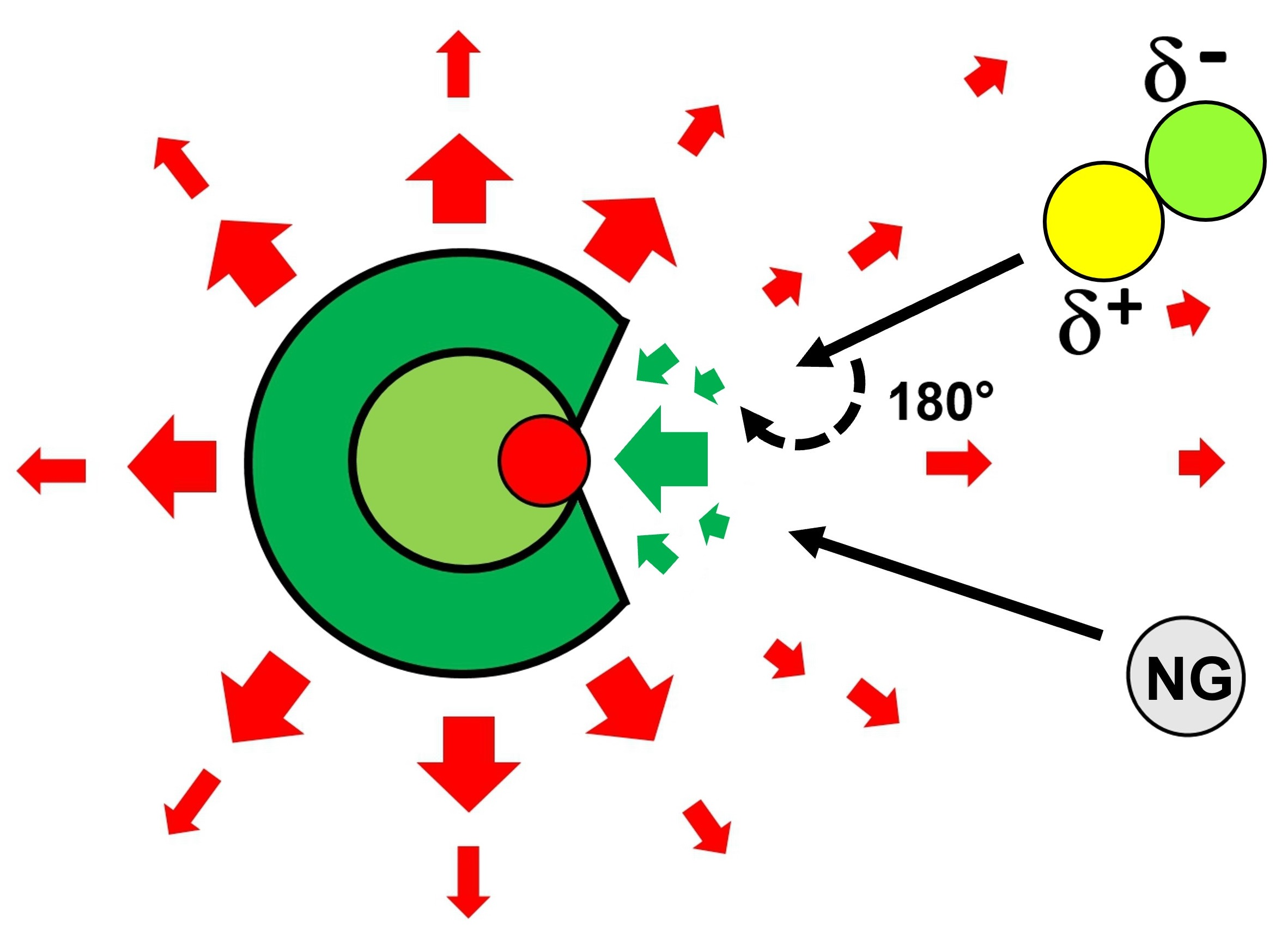
Figure 5: Illustration of the electric field resulting from the molecular charge distribution. The colored arrows represent the force acting on a negative point charge. This force is large and attractive near the positively charged binding site (green arrows) and becomes repulsive at greater distances due to the overall negative charge (red arrows). The change in direction of the electric field near the binding site results in a reversal of the preferred orientation of a dipole. Note: The same color scale as in Figure 4 was used for the coloring.

=== Reactions with noble gases ===
The superelectrophilic anions exhibit special properties that together are very unusual and as a result allow the formation of stable noble gas bonds. These include the strong electrophilicity and structural stability of the anions, which have already been discussed in the Characteristics section. In addition, three further aspects were discussed which may be favourable for bond formation to noble gases:

==== Favored formation and stabilization of the collision complex ====
The strongly electrophilic (positive) binding site within the overall anionic framework generates an unusual electric field near the reactive boron atom. Polar nucleophiles approaching the anion in the preferred orientation must change their orientation to allow the nucleophilic site to react with the anion. This could result in a significant centrifugal barrier and reduce the number of reactive collisions. This effect has no influence on nonpolar molecules such as noble gases (see Fig. 5). The large molecular framework of these polyatomic cage anions allows the collision energy to be redistributed by the collision of the reactants over the many, especially low-energy, vibrational degrees of freedom, so that the collision complex is long-lived enough to be stabilized by collision cooling.

==== Substitution protection ====
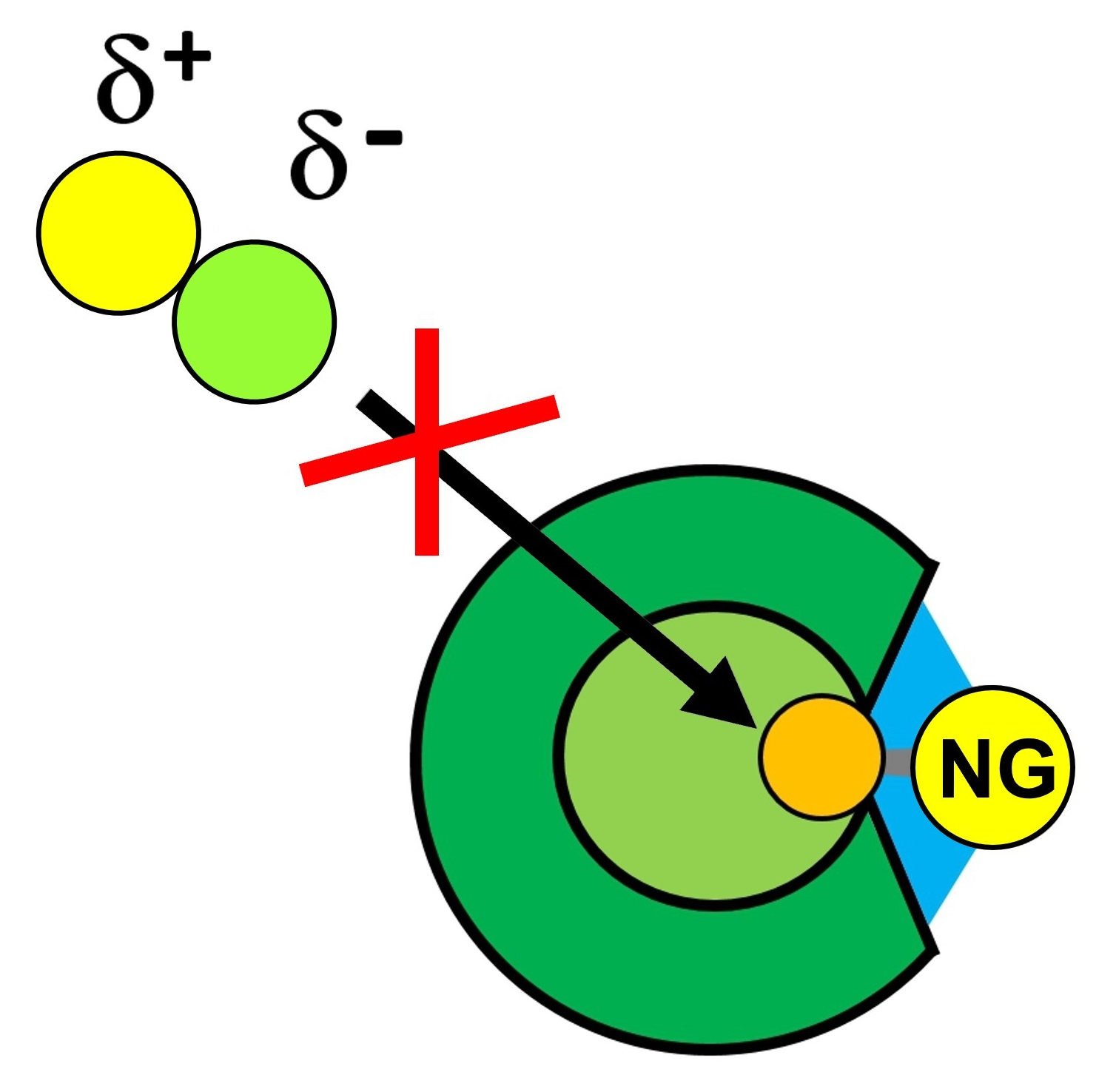
Figure 6: The noble gas atom binds to the positive bonding site, providing electron density (coordinative bonding, dark gray) and thus becoming weakly positive. This allows attractive electrostatic interactions with the surrounding negatively charged substituent shell. SN^{−}_{2} substitution reactions of the bound noble gas atom are prevented by the dodecaborate framework (reaction pathway crossed out in red). In addition, a large contact area for dispersion interactions is present (light blue). Note: The same color scale as in Figure 4 was used for the coloring.

After the noble gas has been bound to the boron atom, its substitution by a nucleophile in a typical SN_{2} reaction is prevented by the cage structure of the borate, since the noble gas-boron bond is shielded sterically (cf. Fig. 6).

==== Favorable electrostatics and dispersion forces ====
In addition to the coordinative noble gas-boron bond, dispersion interactions and electrostatics contribute to the stabilization of the noble gas complex. The electrophilic bonding site is located within a crater defined by five partially negatively charged substituents X, which provide a large interaction region for the formation of attractive London-dispersion forces. The bound noble gas atom, on the other hand, provides electron density to the neighboring boron atom and thus becomes weakly positive, which could play a role in an attractive and stabilizing electrostatic interaction with the surrounding substituents (see Fig. 6).

For the reactions of the individual fragment ion variants with the various noble gases, see also section Variants.

=== Reactions with diatomic molecules: CO, N_{2} ===
The binding of the diatomic molecules CO and N_{2} to superelectrophilic anions was studied using mass spectrometry, infrared photodissociation (IRPD) spectroscopy, and theoretical calculations. CO binds to the vacant boron atom of the electrophilic anion via its nucleophilic carbon. However, in contrast to the reaction with noble gases, the binding does not occur only through a σ-bonding of the nucleophile's CO and N_{2}. The electrophilic anion pushes electron density into the antibonding π-orbitals of N_{2} and CO via π-backbonding, which further strengthens the bond to the electrophilic anion.

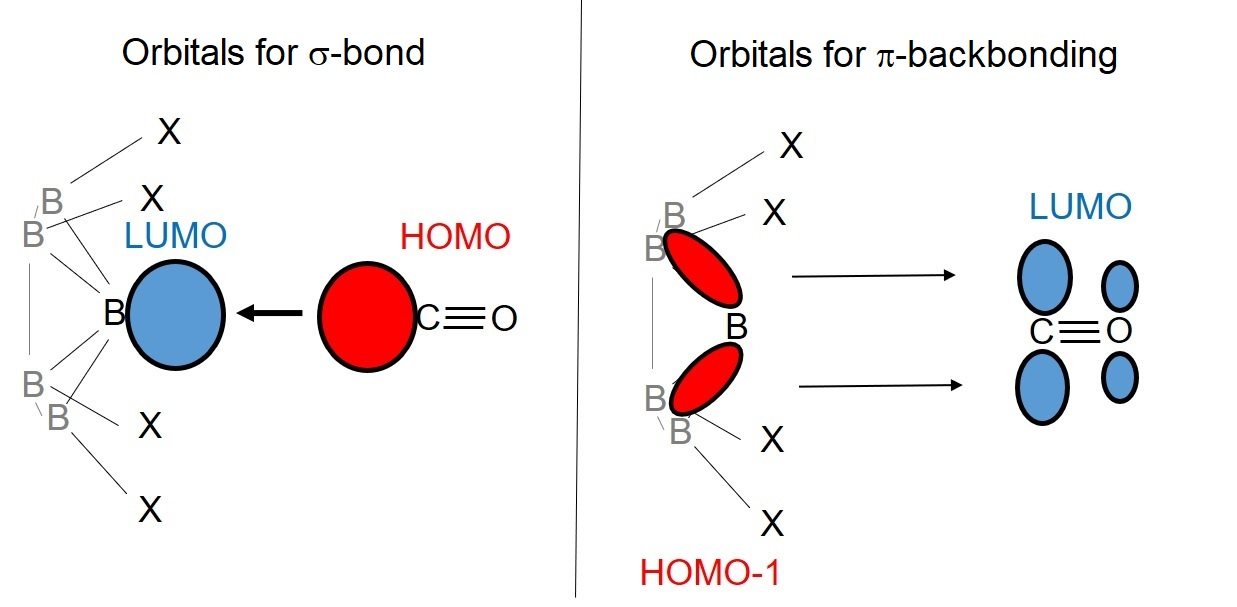
Figure 7: Simplified representation of the orbital interactions involved in the binding of CO (and N_{2}) and the electrophilic anion.

For the reactions of the individual fragment ion variants with CO and N_{2}, see also section Variants.

=== Reactions with saturated hydrocarbons ===
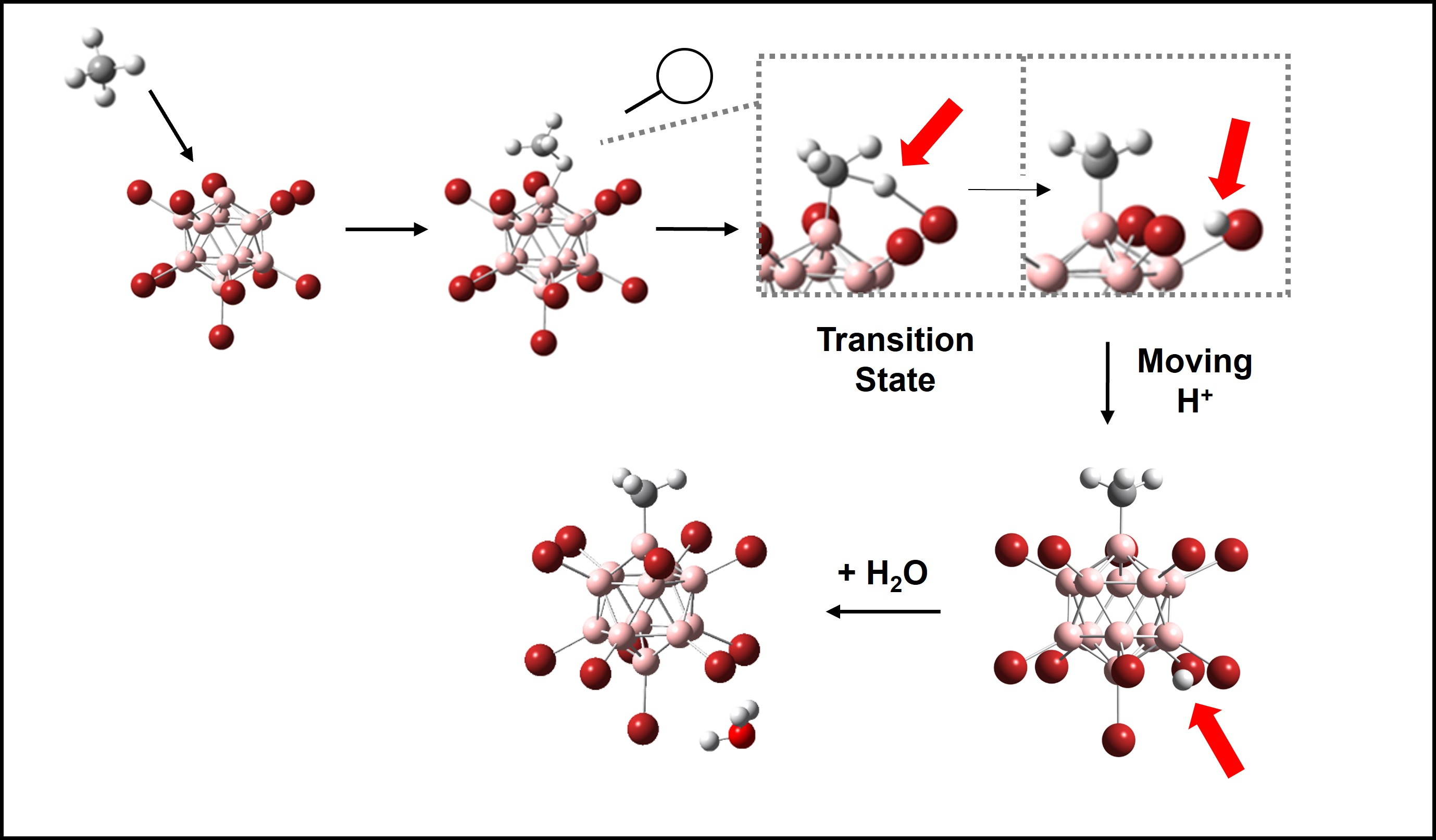
Figure 8: Schematic of the reaction of (B_{12}Br_{11})^{−} with methane. The superelectrophilic anion splits off a proton from the methane and then acts as an anionic acid so that water can be protonated.

The high reactivity of the (B_{12}X_{11})^{−} anions allows not only reactions with noble gases, but also direct functionalization of saturated hydrocarbons.

To elucidate the reaction mechanism, detailed investigations were carried out on the reactivity of (B_{12}Br_{11})^{−} and (B_{12}Cl_{11})^{−} with methane in the gas phase. The molecular structures were investigated with the aid of IR spectroscopy. It was shown that the electrophilic boron atom reacts with the less polar C–H bond. The carbon represents the partially negative (nucleophilic) part of the bond. A heterolytic bond cleavage of the C–H bond occurs, which formally leads to a carbanion (CH^{−}_{3}) and a proton (H^{+}). The carbanion binds to the electrophilic boron atom of (B_{12}X_{11})^{−}, forming the dianion (B_{12}X_{11}CH_{3})^{2−}, while the H^{+} ion remains electrostatically bound to this dianion in the gas phase. The overall singly-charged ion (B_{12}X_{11}CH_{3})^{2−} (H)^{+} is a Brønsted acid. Upon contact with water, (B_{12}X_{11}CH_{3})^{2−} (H_{3}O)^{+} is formed, which can be detected by the characteristic "umbrella mode" of the coordinated hydronium ion (H_{3}O)^{+} (cf. Figs. 8 and 9). In addition, the fragment ions (B_{12}Br_{11})^{−} and (B_{12}Cl_{11})^{−} were deposited on surfaces by the ion soft-landing method, where they reacted with the alkyl chains of organic compounds. The attachment to the nonpolar alkyl chains occurred selectively in the presence of much more reactive functional groups such as aromatic and ester groups. This surprising preference for C–H groups as reactants may be related to the fact that hydrophobic alkyl groups are oriented towards the vacuum in such surface layers. The superelectrophilic anions react directly at the vacuum interface with C–H groups of the phthalate alkyl groups according to the mechanism for methane binding shown in Figure 8.

Figure 9: IRPD spectrum of the reaction product of (B_{12}X_{11})^{−} and methane. Animated are the vibrational motions of the strongly IR active modes including the characteristic inversion vibration of the coordinated hydronium ion. (For moving animation of the figure, please click on it).

=== Reactions with anions ===
In the gas phase, ion-ion reactions can usually only take place between ions of opposite polarity – that is, between anion and cation. The reaction partners attract each other by long-range Coulomb force, and the complementary reactivities of the nucleophilic anion and the electrophilic cation cause the formation of a stable bond. On the other hand, an anion usually has no affinity to bind to other anions for two reasons. Firstly, the large Coulomb barrier keeps ions of the same polarity at a distance and secondly, there is no thermodynamic driving force between two nucleophiles to form a bond. However, the strong electrophilicity of the (B_{12}X_{11})^{−} ions creates such a driving force, which enables to form stable bonds to some anions which creates highly charged ions. However, the repulsive electrostatic interactions are long range and therefore cannot be overcome in the gas phase by these electrophilic anions. Thus, the anions are kept at a distance and cannot react with each other. To circumvent this problem, the corresponding anions were selectively brought together on grounded surfaces using the ion soft-landing method. For example, the highly reactive fragment anion (B_{12}I_{11})^{−} and the stable dianion (B_{12}I_{12})^{2−} was used to create the trianion (B_{12}I_{11} − I − B_{12}I_{11})^{3−}.

== Variants ==
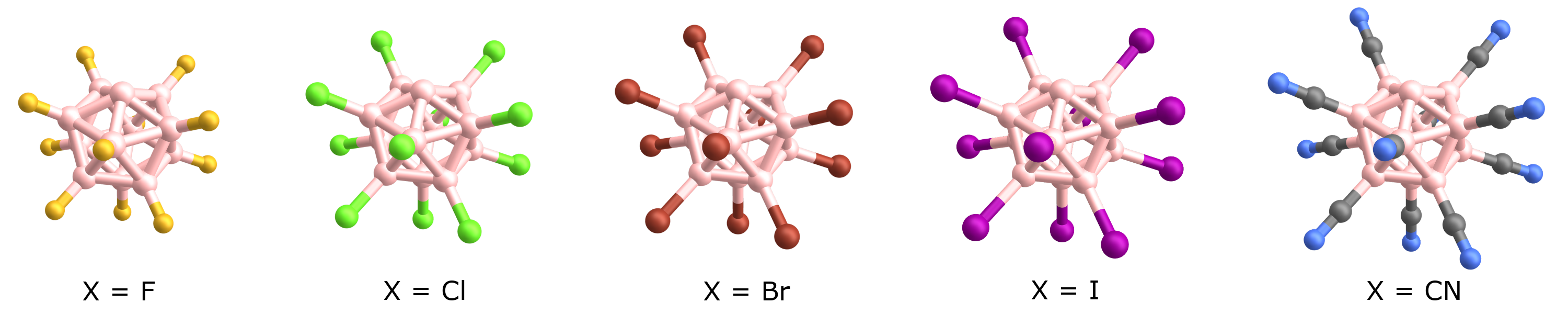
Figure 10: Structure of the experimentally studied electrophilic fragment anions (B_{12}X_{11})^{−} with the different substituents X.

By exchanging the substituents (X), different variants of the closo-dodecaborate precursors and thus also of the fragment anions can be generated. So far, five variants have been produced experimentally in the gas phase and their reactivity investigated: The fragment anions (B_{12}X_{11})^{−} with substituents X = F, Cl, Br, I, and CN.

The nature of the substituents significantly influences the electrophilicity of the fragment anion. The thermodynamic stability of the precursor dianion seems to play an important role. A qualitative general guideline is:

The more electronically stable the precursor dianion, the more electrophilic the corresponding monoanion generated by gas-phase fragmentation.

Table 1 provides an overview of the reactions possible at room temperature between the different noble gases and experimentally accessible variants of the superelectrophilic anions. Furthermore, it shows how the reactivity of the variants is related to the electronic stability of the precursor and to the calculated atomic charge of the vacant boron.

Table 1: Reactions of the variants with the different noble gases at room temperature in relation to precursor stability and atomic charge of the vacant boron (the latter determined using the Natural Population Analysis (NPA) method).

	(B_{12}F_{11})^{−}	(B_{12}I_{11})^{−}	(B_{12}Cl_{11})^{−}	(B_{12}Br_{11})^{−}	(B_{12}(CN)_{11})^{−}
Ne	╳	╳	╳	╳	╳
Ar	╳	╳	╳	╳	✓
Kr	╳	╳	✓	✓	✓
Xe	✓	✓	✓	✓	✓
Electronic stability of the precursor (in eV)	1.9	2.9	3.0	3.2	5.3
Atomic charge of vacant boron (in e)	+ 0.45	+ 0.66	+ 0.64	+ 0.64	+ 0.82

It can be seen that the reactivities of (B_{12}Cl_{11})^{−} and (B_{12}Br_{11})^{−} can be classified as similar, while (B_{12}F_{11})^{−} and (B_{12}I_{11})^{−} are less reactive. The reduced noble gas binding strength can be attributed to a less electrophilic vacant boron atom in the case of X = F, because the atomic charge of the vacant boron calculated using the Natural Population Analysis (NPA) method is + 0.45 e, while it is much larger for the other halogens (for X = Cl, for example, + 0.64 e). In the case of X = I, the boron atom is similarly electrophilic as for X = Cl and X = Br, but the sterically very demanding iodine ligands are a hindrance for bond formation.

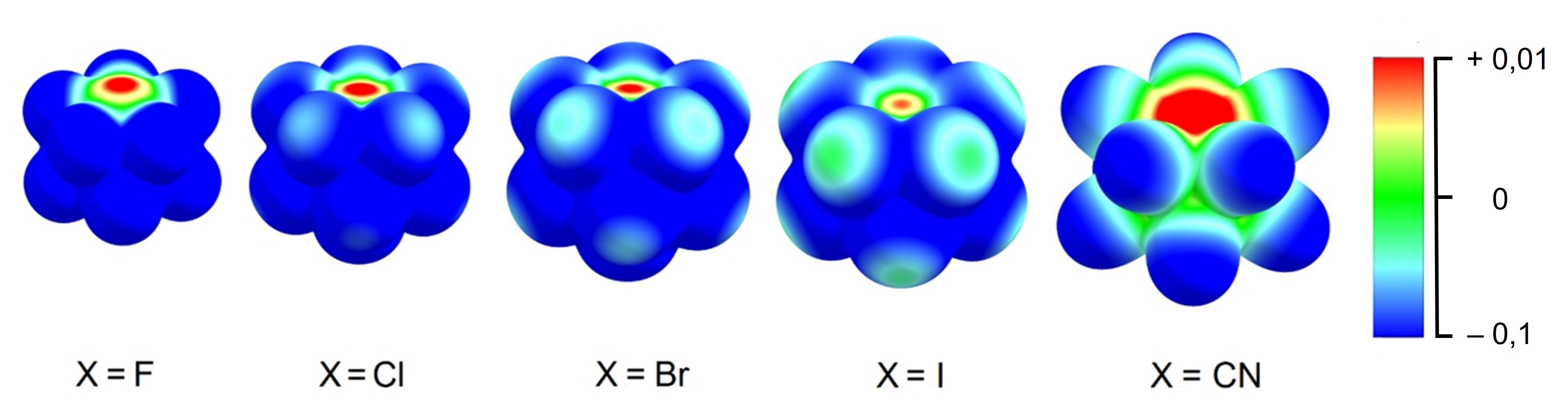
Figure 11: Visualization of the electrostatic potential on the molecular surface of the different superelectrophilic anions. Positive potential is shown in red, neutral potential in green and negative potential in blue, cf. color scale on the right (unit: a.u.). Note: The scale is linear, but the slope in the negative region (from green to blue) has ten times the magnitude of the slope in the positive region (from green to red).

In (B_{12}(CN)_{11})^{−}, however, the vacant boron atom with an atomic charge of + 0.82 e is significantly more electrophilic than those of the halogenated variants (cf. Fig. 11).

Figure 11 shows the electrostatic potential on the molecular surface of the different (B_{12}X_{11})^{−} variants, illustrating the different reactivities of the vacant boron atoms, which are influenced on the one hand by the strength of the electron deficiency (positive electrostatic potential shown in red) and on the other hand by the accessibility of the electrophilic center. The latter depends significantly on the size of the substituents X, since these contribute to a spatial shielding of the vacant boron atom.

It should be noted, however, that the reactivities depend to a large extent on the type of reaction partner used. Expressed in a simplified way, the variants have different preferences with regard to their nucleophilic reaction partners. Furthermore, if a variant is more reactive towards a particular reaction partner than another variant, this does not mean that it is universally more reactive. For example, (B_{12}Cl_{11})^{−} binds noble gases more strongly than (B_{12}F_{11})^{−}, but the latter binds CO and N_{2} more strongly. This difference can be explained by the fact that the binding strength to noble gases is dominated by the electrophilicity of the vacant boron atom, whereas the binding to N_{2} or CO is significantly influenced by the formation of π-backbonds (see section Reactions with diatomic molecules). During π-backbonding, electron transfer occurs from occupied molecular orbitals of the (B_{12}X_{11})^{−} to the antibonding π-orbitals of the N_{2} or CO, respectively. However, since a lower electrophilicity of the vacant boron atom is accompanied by energetically higher lying occupied orbitals and thus an increased ability to donate electron density, the weakest noble gas binder is simultaneously the strongest N_{2} and CO binder among the superelectrophilic anions, and vice versa.

== Theoretical studies / computer simulations ==
Complementary to the described experimental studies, the reactivity of superelectrophilic anions has also been extensively investigated by theoretical "computational chemistry" methods. The noble gas-boron bond has been analyzed both in combined experimental-theoretical studies and in independent theoretical studies. For this purpose, methods such as Quantum Theory of Atoms in Molecules (QTAIM) and Energy Decomposition Analysis (EDA) have been used. The possibility of stabilizing compounds of the superelectrophilic anions with noble gases in the condensed phase has also been discussed and theoretically investigated.

In addition, other theoretical studies are concerned with reactivity toward H_{2} or with electrophilic anions not accessible experimentally so far: These include beryllium-containing superelectrophilic dianions and the anions (B_{12}(BO)_{11})^{−} and (B_{12}(OBO)_{11})^{−}.

== Scientific relevance and potential applications ==
The extraordinary reactivity of superelectrophilic anions enables them to form bonds to very unreactive atoms or molecules. Such reactions between superelectrophilic anions and unreactive substances are of interest in many respects:

Exploring new reaction mechanisms for direct functionalization of unreactive resources:

Many natural resources such as N_{2}, CO_{2} or small hydrocarbons are very inert due to the stable bonds within the molecules. This prevents efficient utilization of these resources, which would be of high ecological and economic interest. With the help of superelectrophilic anions, new knowledge can be gained about mechanisms of direct functionalization of such unreactive compounds, which could potentially be helpful in the future searching for methods to utilize unreactive resources.

Generation of exotic compounds for fundamental chemical research:

Reactions with (B_{12}X_{11})^{−} anions enable the preparation of a variety of exotic compounds that are of interest for fundamental chemical research. These include, for example, noble gas-containing molecular anions or highly charged cluster ions that are usually not synthetically accessible. There has been some research on noble gas-containing molecular anions, but most of it is purely theoretical. In contrast, noble gas-containing anions of the type (B_{12}X_{11} − NG)^{−} (NG = noble gas) can actually be prepared experimentally, not only at temperatures near absolute zero (0 Kelvin) as required for weakly bound complexes, but also at room temperature (298 Kelvin). Moreover, they are comparatively robust against attack by nucleophiles such as water. At room temperature, small amounts of nucleophiles such as water can hardly be avoided in vacuum instruments and tend to decompose noble gas-containing reaction products by substitution reactions. However, this problem does not play a major role in the case of the noble gas-containing anions of the type (B_{12}X_{11} − NG)^{−} described here.

Generation of novel substances as prototypes for potential drugs:

(B_{12}X_{11})^{−} ions can be directly bound to larger organic structures to produce entirely new boron-containing organic molecules in this way. Such novel molecules could represent interesting reagents in the future, for example, for cancer drugs in the context of boron neutron capture therapy. For this, however, the synthesis methods would first have to be improved so that significantly higher yields can be achieved in the condensed phase.

Generation of permanent ions for electrospray mass spectrometry analyses:

By binding (B_{12}X_{11})^{−} to neutral, nonpolar molecules, these can be converted into permanent ions. This has the advantage of opening up new perspectives for the analysis of these nonpolar molecules with electrospray mass spectrometry, which would not be possible without the binding to the (B_{12}X_{11})^{−} ions.

== Research locations ==
Research on superelectrophilic anions in the gas phase has its origin at the University of Bremen and at the Wilhelm Ostwald Institute (WOI) of the University of Leipzig (Germany). The main focus is currently at WOI, where most of the experimental studies take place.

U.S. research groups from Pacific Northwest National Laboratory (PNNL) in Richland and Purdue University in West Lafayette have also made important experimental contributions to the study of superelectrophilic anions through collaborations with WOI.

The precursors, which are used to generate the electrophilic anions, are mostly synthesized at the Bergische Universität Wuppertal (Germany). Theoretical studies on this class of compounds have already been carried out by many groups around the world – such as in the USA, China, India or Germany.
