= Patoka Formation =

Geological formation in Illinois, USA

- Stratigraphic range: Pennsylvanian
- Type: Formation
- Unit of: McLeansboro Group
- Underlies: Bond Formation
- Overlies: Shelburn Formation

Location
- Region: Illinois and Indiana
- Country: United States

The Patoka Formation is a geologic formation in Illinois. It preserves fossils dating back to the Carboniferous period.

== See also ==
- List of fossiliferous stratigraphic units in Illinois
