= Pawnee Formation =

Carboniferous geologic formation in the Midwest US

- Stratigraphic range: Carboniferous
- Type: Formation

Location
- Region: Illinois, Kansas, Oklahoma, Missouri
- Country: United States

Type section
- Named for: Pawnee Creek, Bourbon County, Kansas
- Named by: George C. Swallow, 1866

The Pawnee Formation is a geologic formation in Illinois, Kansas, Missouri and Oklahoma. It preserves fossils dating back to the Carboniferous period.

== See also ==
- List of fossiliferous stratigraphic units in Illinois
