= Hardinsburg Formation =

Geologic formation in Illinois

- Stratigraphic range: Mississippian
- Type: Formation
- Unit of: Stephensport Group
- Underlies: Glen Dean Limestone
- Overlies: Haney Limestone

Location
- Region: Illinois and Indiana
- Country: United States

The Hardinsburg Formation is a geologic formation in Illinois. It preserves fossils dating back to the Carboniferous period.

== See also ==
- List of fossiliferous stratigraphic units in Illinois
