= Wilhelm Ostwald Institute =

Research institute in Leipzig, Germany

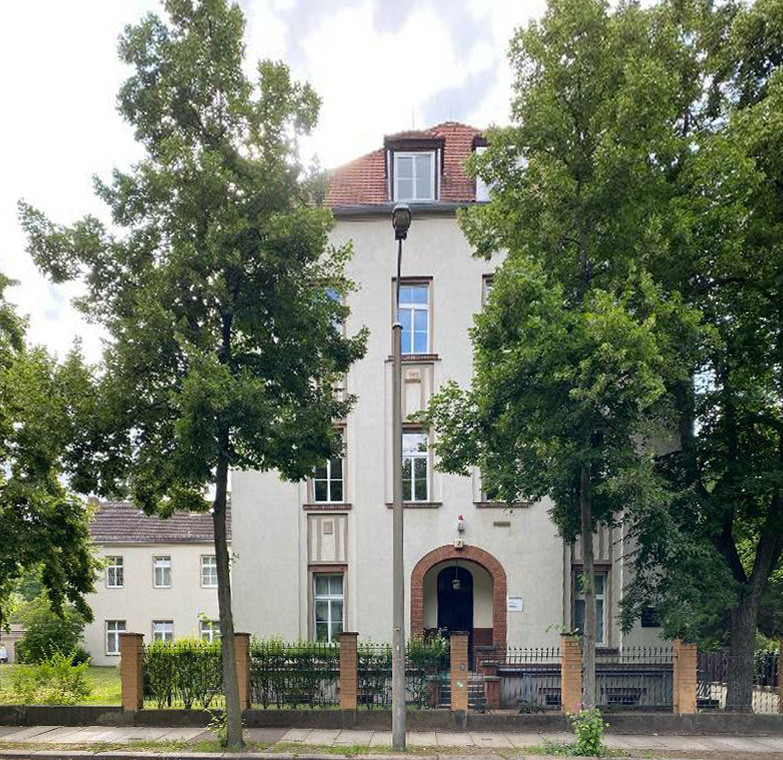
The Wilhelm-Ostwald-Institute (University of Leipzig, Germany) in summer 2021

The Wilhelm Ostwald Institute for Physical and Theoretical Chemistry at the University of Leipzig, located at Linnéstraße 2 in Leipzig, is the oldest physical chemistry institute in Germany. It is one of seven institutes of the Faculty of Chemistry and Mineralogy of the University of Leipzig. The institute was ceremoniously inaugurated in 1898 by its first director, Nobel Prize winner Wilhelm Ostwald, and has borne the official name "Wilhelm Ostwald Institute for Physical and Theoretical Chemistry" since 1998.

== The institute building ==
=== Foundation and first years ===
As early as 1870, the Ministry of Culture and Public Education in Dresden had made an appointment for the then young field of physical chemistry. Gustav Wiedemann accepted the first professorship for physical chemistry in Leipzig in 1871 and, during this time, led the first "Physical-Chemical Laboratory". On October 25, 2021, the 150th anniversary celebration took place in Leipzig.

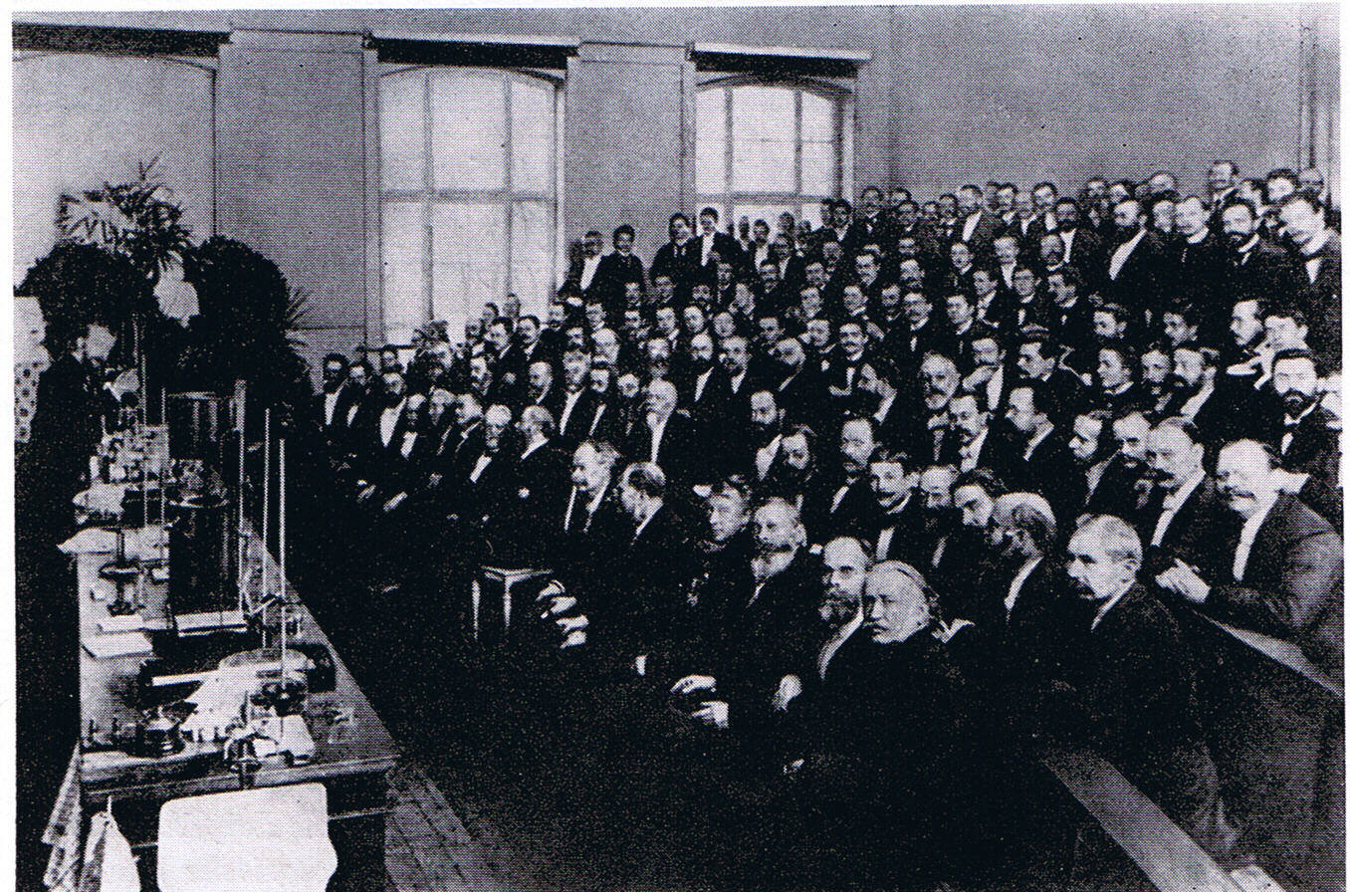
Keynote lecture of Wilhelm Ostwald at the inauguration of the newly built Physical-Chemical Institute on January 3, 1898.

Wilhelm Ostwald took over this professorship in 1887, while Wiedemann accepted the position to become the chair of physics.

From 1887, the so-called "Second-Chemical Laboratory" under the direction of Wilhelm Ostwald at Brüderstr. 34 in Leipzig had become an internationally important center for physical chemistry. However, the premises could no longer meet this demand.

For this reason, the Saxon Parliament granted 360,000 marks for the construction of a new institute in February 1896. Construction began immediately and as a result, teaching and research could begin as early as the winter semester of 1897.

On January 3, 1898, the newly built Physical-Chemical Institute was inaugurated. On the occasion of the ceremonial opening, Wilhelm Ostwald gave a keynote lecture and several important physicists and chemists at the time took part in the celebration, including Max Planck, Ernst Otto Beckmann and Max Le Blanc.

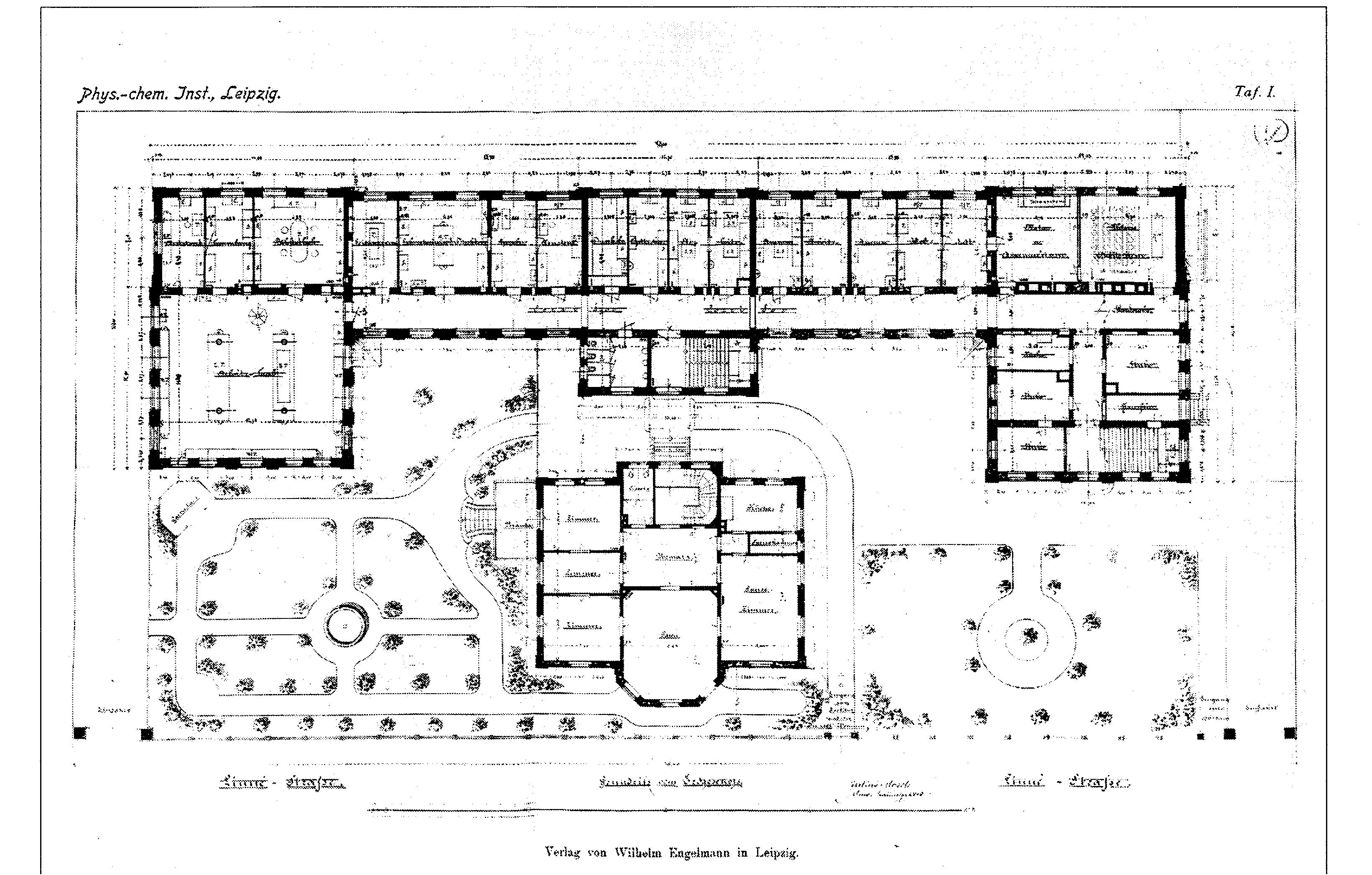
Ground Floor Plan

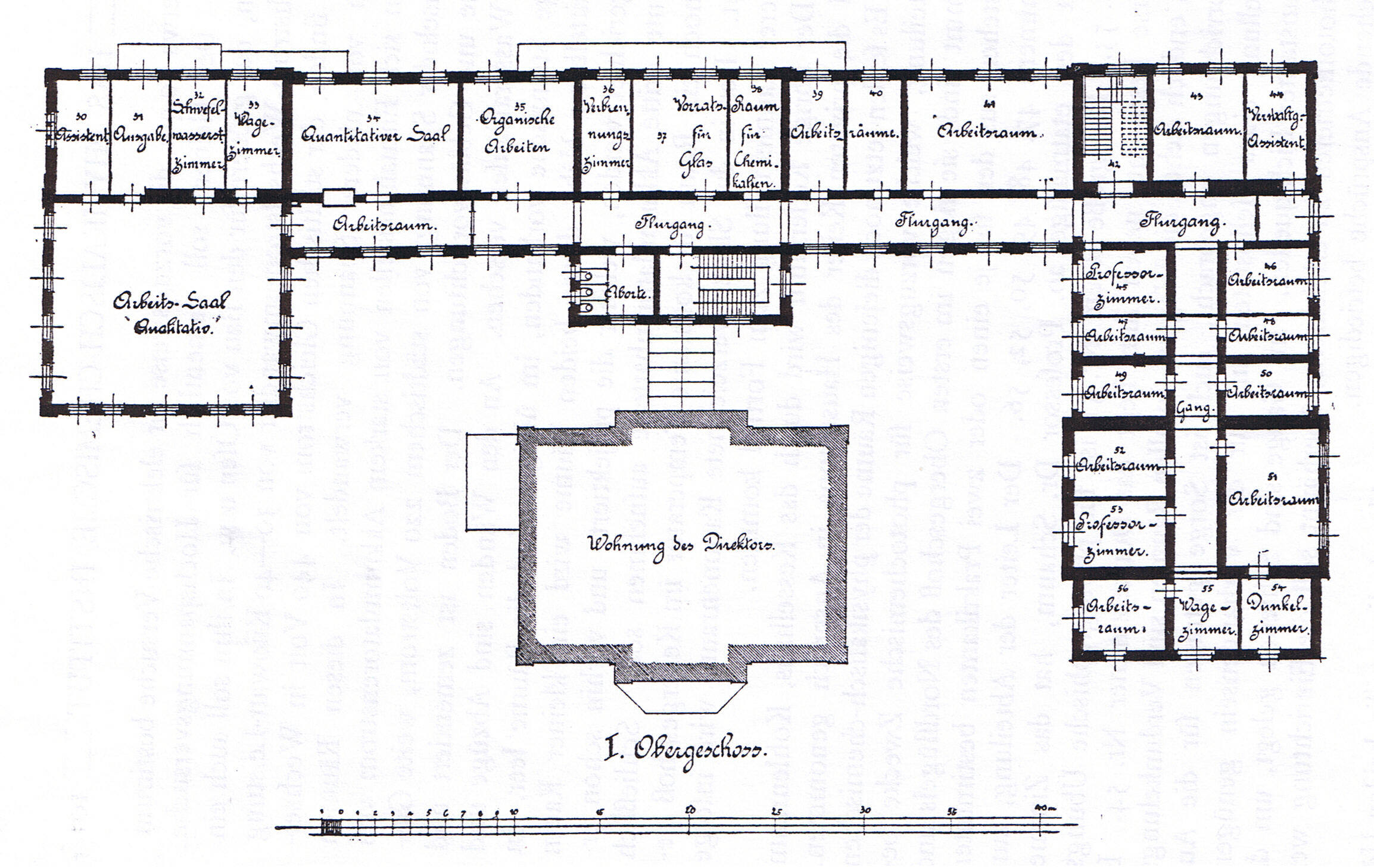
Ground plan: Upper floor after reconstruction and extension 1909/10

The U-shaped building had been furnished according to the most modern standards of the time: In the basement there was a large and a small battery, on the 1st floor there was a large workroom and equipment rooms, and on the 2nd floor there were two lecture halls (with 140 and 42 seats, respectively). In the attic there was a geological collection. There was also a director's apartment, located in the middle of the institute building and connected to the rest of the building by a corridor.

The old premises in the Brüderstraße were transferred to Ernst Otto Beckmann, for the establishment of a new professorship for applied chemistry.

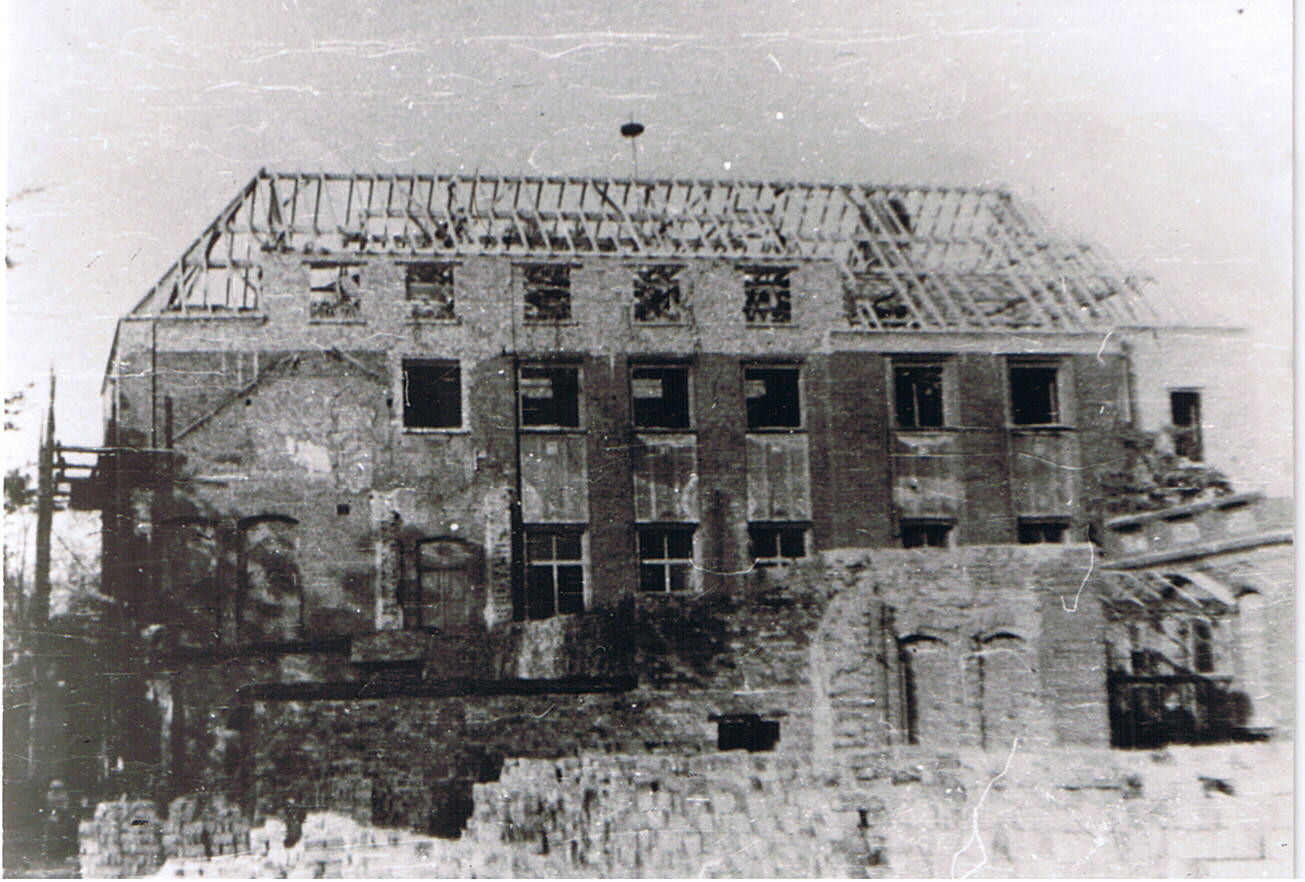
Picture of the north wing of the Wilhelm-Ostwald-Institute before the reconstruction

Max Le Blanc succeeded Ostwald as director in 1906 and made alterations to the building to provide more space especially for electrochemical and photochemical research.

=== World War II destruction and reconstruction ===
During the great air raid on Leipzig on December 4, 1943 (during World War II), the institute building was destroyed by incendiary bombs. The south wing was particularly badly hit.

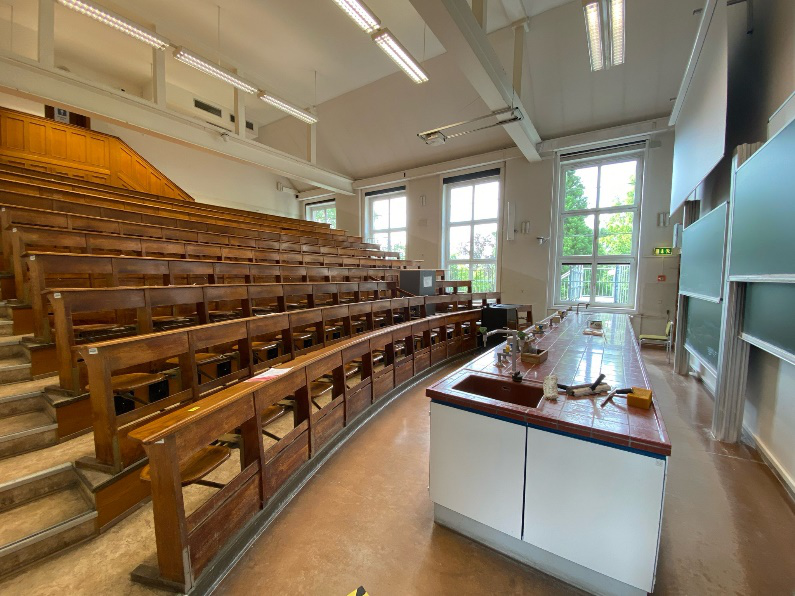
Historical Lecture Hall at the Wilhelm-Ostwald-Institute (University of Leipzig)

The reconstruction of the north wing and parts of the central building were completed in 1951/52 so that work could be resumed. The institute now had a lecture hall (136 seats), three practical rooms and 24 laboratories. The workshop, collections and administrative rooms could also be used again.

At the beginning of the 1990s, the central building and the north wing (including renovation of the lecture hall) were completely refurbished and, in the course of this, the institute was also connected to the municipal district heating supply; until then, the institute operated its own hot water supply.

== Research, people and structures of the institute ==
=== Between 1887 and 1898 ===
Wilhelm Ostwald was appointed professor at the University of Leipzig in 1887 and took up this post in October of the same year. He thus took over the so-called "Second Chemical Laboratory" at Brüderstraße 34 from Gustav Wiedemann. The laboratory was divided into three departments "Physical-Chemical Department", "Analytical Department" and "Pharmaceutical Department". At this time, the laboratory was not yet a purely "physico-chemical" institute, but had a more diverse structure and was also responsible, for example, for the basic training of chemists, just as there were teaching activities for pharmacists and high school teachers.

Research at the end of the 19th century included in particular the theory of solutions, electrical conductivity, the dissociation of acids and bases, determination of molecular weights, theory of contact potentials, theory of electrical chains, polarization, internal friction, diffusion, and the optical, thermal, and volume relationships in chemical reactions.

Ostwald's dilution law was also published at this laboratory in 1888, after Ostwald had made conductivity measurements of various acids.

Svante Arrhenius had already been a collaborator of Ostwald in Riga and followed him to Leipzig as an assistant in 1888. Arrhenius conducted research in Leipzig until 1891, and in 1903 he was awarded the Nobel Prize in Chemistry for his theory of electrolytic dissociation. The development of the Arrhenius equation dates from his time in Leipzig.

Walther Nernst accepted an invitation from Ostwald to come to Leipzig to write his habilitation thesis. He successfully completed the thesis on „Die elektromotorische Wirksamkeit der Jonen" ("The Electromotive Effectiveness of Jons") in 1889. In his habilitation, Nernst published the Nernst equation named after him. Nernst received the Nobel Prize in Chemistry for the year 1920 as "recognition for his thermochemical work."

Julius Wagner was responsible for the analytical department between 1887 and 1897. Together with Ostwald, he developed a new didactics of the subject, gave lectures and designed new experiments for chemistry classes. In 1901, he was appointed the first professor of chemistry didactics in Germany.

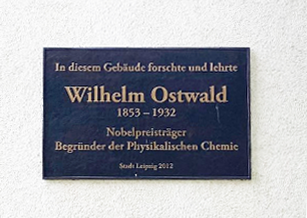
Commemorative plaque at the Wilhelm-Ostwald-Institute, University of Leipzig

=== Between 1898 and 1933 ===
Wilhelm Ostwald was at the height of his research at the time the institute was founded. Around 1900, he devoted himself in particular to experimental investigations on catalysis and chemical kinetics. In addition, time as an experimental quantity came into focus and with it the beginning of non-equilibrium thermodynamics. He also explored nitric acid production by oxidation of ammonia on a platinum contact and the direct recovery of ammonia from nitrogen and hydrogen, together with Eberhard Brauer. Detailed lists of publications from this period are provided, for example, in the book "Physikalische Chemie in Leipzig" by Ulf Messow and Konrad Krause. Ostwald left the institute in 1906 after disagreements with the university administration.

Under Ostwald, practical research was carried out at the institute and some apparatus and measuring equipment was built or developed - for example, Ostwald's Urthermostat for controlling temperature and pycnometer for measuring liquid density. In addition, measurements of conductivity, voltage of elements, measurements of viscosity and surface tension were carried out and corresponding apparatuses were refined. The university mechanic Fritz Köhler founded his company on this basis and built these devices for the laboratories independently. Ostwald arranged for his students to complete a practical course in equipment development in this company, which more than 100 students took advantage of.

Max Le Blanc succeeded Ostwald as director. Le Blanc was Ostwald's assistant from 1890 to 1896 and habilitated in Leipzig in 1891 with his first studies on decomposition voltage. He held the post of director for 27 years, the longest anyone has ever held this position. At this time, he was also secretary of the Saxon Academy of Sciences, also longer than anyone else.

During his time, Le Blanc introduced the oscillograph as a measuring instrument of electrochemistry, and continued his work on measuring rapid potential changes on electrodes. He established the following departments including professorships: Photochemical Department, Chemical Department, Physical Chemical Department and Colloid Chemical Department. In addition, there were electrochemical exercises and exercises on catalysis.

=== Between 1933 and 1947 ===
After Max Le Blanc's retirement, Wilhelm Carl Böttger succeeded him as director on a provisional basis for one year. However, the temporary succession was extended because Johannes Stark (President of the Physikalisch-Technische Reichsanstalt and Chairman of the Notgemeinschaft der deutschen Wissenschaft) wanted to impose Wolfgang Ostwald (the son of Wilhelm Ostwald) as director - against the faculty's wish to appoint Karl Friedrich Bonhoeffer.

On November 1, 1934, Karl Friedrich Bonhoeffer was finally appointed as the chair of physical chemistry. He remained director of the institute until 1947. Bonhoeffer's research during this time focused on the labeling of atoms in biochemical processes with deuterium and on the reaction kinetics of gases and processes at electrode surfaces. Wolfgang Ostwald accepted the position of chair in colloid chemistry starting in 1935.

Bonhoeffer retained Le Blanc's structure of dividing the institute into departments. However, the "Analytical Department" was renamed the "Department of Applied Physical Chemistry" after Prof. Böttger retired in 1938. During the time of the 'Drittes Reich' (Nazi Germany), Bonhoeffer retained his position as director, although his entire family worked against the Nazis and despite the threat of arrest on several occasions. One of Karl Friedrich Bonhoeffer's younger brothers was the theologian Dietrich Bonhoeffer. From 1941 onwards, all of the Institute's research was directed towards wartime research, and research commissions came directly from the War Ministry. Since the orders were subject to secrecy, quite little is known to this day about the research of this period. The Institute (and several surrounding buildings) were destroyed in air raids on December 4, 1943, and several following. All chemists then moved back to the original building at Brüderstraße 34. In June 1945, many professors of natural sciences from Leipzig were taken to Western Germany by the American occupiers. Bonhoeffer was able to escape this and remained director of the Physical-Chemical Institute until 1947. The Soviet Military Administration in Germany (SMAD) approved the reopening of the university for February 5, 1946. The faculty of the University of Leipzig shrank from 187 professors to 44 between May 8, 1945, and the reopening - due to denazification, compulsory service in the Soviet Union, and the like. Some chemists were also among them: Of previously 4 professors, only Bonhoeffer and one of the assistants remained in Leipzig after the war. Especially chemists who were familiar with the production and handling of heavy water as this was of great interest in the Soviet Union. From 1946, some operations at the institute could be resumed, work begun during the war could be continued in part, and three doctoral students defended their dissertations in the same year.

=== Between 1947 and 1968 ===
Bonhoeffer was followed by Herbert Staude as director of the institute from 1947 to 1959. He had studied in Leipzig himself, had been an assistant to Max Le Blanc between 1925 and 1931, and now returned to Leipzig after several other positions. As director, he also oversaw the construction of the north wing of the Physico-Chemical Institute at Linnéstraße 2, in which he was particularly supported by the janitor of the time, Max Schädlich. From 1952, the institute had a lecture hall with 136 seats, three practical rooms, 24 laboratories, as well as a workshop and administrative rooms. In 1959, the institute again had 41 employees, 18 of whom were scientists. Research at this time was mainly concerned with photochemistry (e.g. the photochemical properties of silver halides and other light-sensitive substances), thermochemistry (e.g. thermodynamic functions of inorganic substances or heats of mixing in liquid systems), electrochemistry (especially electrode processes), colloid chemistry and X-ray spectroscopy. Studies of exchange adsorption were carried out in an affiliated department.

During this time, there were repeated "Republikflucht" to West Germany. As a result, there were numerous interrogations, accusations and even arrests at the institute. It is believed that for this reason, the director Herbert Staude did not return to Leipzig from a conference in Austria in 1959. He found employment (later professorship) in Frankfurt am Main (West Germany) a little later.

He was succeeded in Leipzig in 1960 by Gerhard Geiseler, whose practical experience in industry also shaped the research focus at the institute. He had habilitated in Leipzig in 1955, and then received a chair in physical chemistry in 1960. During his time, there were research groups on kinetics, thermodynamics and molecular spectroscopy, and the two groups on electrochemistry and X-ray spectroscopy also remained. In 1965, Prof. Armin Meisel's "X-ray spectroscopy" group organized an international conference entitled "X-ray spectra and chemical bonding", which was held frequently in the following years. During Geiseler's years, the work at the institute was strongly oriented towards experiments, for which a wide variety of apparatus was developed, built and operated. This required close cooperation with the workshops.

=== Between 1968 and 1991 ===
Right at the beginning of the GDR period, the universities were to be transformed from "civil universities" into state-controlled and organized universities. There were the so-called university reforms, carried out by the State Secretariat for Higher and Technical Education. In the course of the reforms, the State Secretariat significantly changed the content and structure of the universities, which of course also affected the Physico-Chemical Institute in Leipzig.

On June 15, 1968 (after the III. University Reform), the Chemistry Section was established and the Institutes of Chemistry were dissolved, making Geiseler the last director of the Physico-Chemical Institute since Wilhelm Ostwald. The aim of this introduction of sections was, on the one hand, to create conditions for more easily feasible interdisciplinary cooperation, and on the other hand, to create clear hierarchies so that the universities could be more easily supervised. The sections each had a section director, who in turn reported directly to the director of the university. The first section director of chemistry was Prof. Siegfried Hauptmann (1968–1972). During this time, the study program was very research-oriented and practical, which was further supported by mandatory company internships.

From 1981 onwards, the original 14 research groups of the Chemistry Section were concentrated into 8 scientific areas. Research topics were, for example, modern evaluation methods of X-ray spectroscopy, characterization of zeolites or also processing of raw lignite, catalytic high-pressure hydrogenation and extraction of gasification fuels.

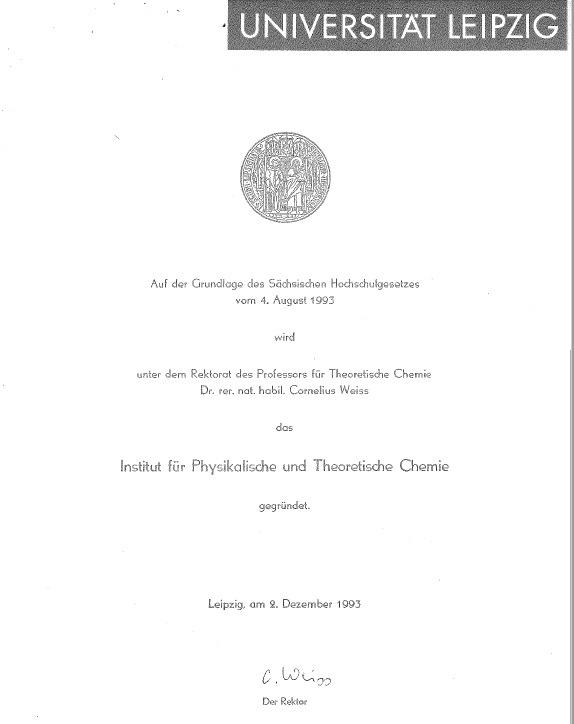
Founding Document of the Institute for Physical and Theoretical Chemistry (University of Leipzig), December 1993

=== Foundation of the Faculty of Chemistry and Mineralogy ===
After the German reunification, a new section director was elected: Prof. Cornelius Weiss, who, however, held this post only until he took up his position as Rector of the University of Leipzig from 1.11.1990 to 4.3.1991. He was succeeded in the post by his deputy, Prof. Horst Wilde. From this time on, instead of the term "Section", the term "Department" was introduced, which had already been in use before the GDR period. The Department of Chemistry belonged to the Faculty of Mathematics and Natural Sciences and was divided into 7 scientific sections plus a department for the methodology of chemistry teaching. Exactly 584 years after the official opening of the University of Leipzig in 1409, on December 2, 1993, there was a return to the structures that existed before the university reforms of GDR times. 64 institutes were created at the University of Leipzig.

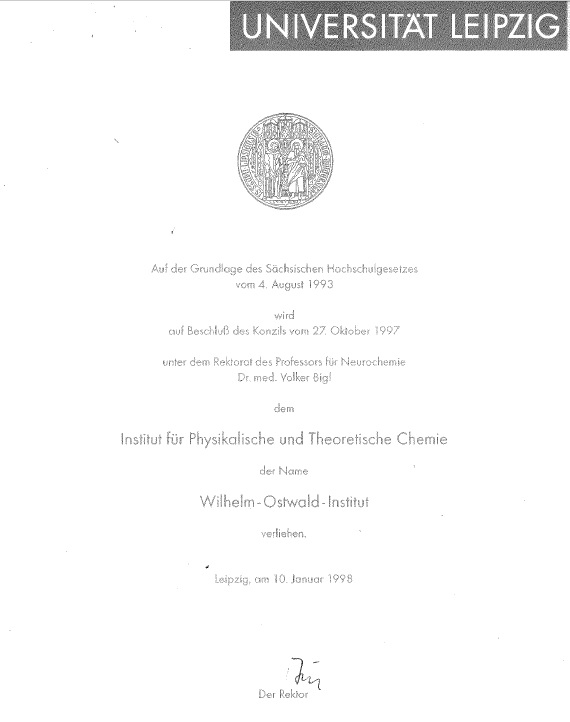
Certificate of designation of the Institute of Physical and Theoretical Chemistry as "Wilhelm Ostwald Institute" (University of Leipzig), January 1998

As of 1993, the Department of Chemistry consisted of eight institutes, including the Institute of Physical and Theoretical Chemistry. This was founded on 2.12.1993, the first director was Prof. Konrad Quitzsch. At that time, the institute consisted of 6 professors, 31 employees and 26 externally funded staff.

These institutes and the area of chemistry didactics together formed the Faculty of Chemistry and Mineralogy - the founding document for this dates from January 14, 1994. The first dean of the newly founded Faculty of Chemistry and Mineralogy was Prof. Dr. Joachim Reinhold, Vice Dean was Prof. Dr. Lothar Beyer and Dean of Studies Prof. Dr. Horst Wilde.

The Institute for Physical and Theoretical Chemistry has borne the official name "Wilhelm Ostwald Institute for Physical and Theoretical Chemistry" since the 1998 celebrations of the 100th anniversary of its inauguration in 1898.

=== Research between 1990 and 2018 ===
After the election of Peter Bräuer as head of the scientific division (in german „Wissenschaftsbereich", WB) "Physical Chemistry" in October 1990, three new research groups (in german „Forschungsgruppe", FG) were formed within this WB (later this term was replaced by "working group" (in german „Arbeitssgruppe", AG)):

The FG "Physical Chemistry of Interfaces" was headed by Peter Bräuer and J. Hoffmann. They did research on porous solids and their use for mass transfer processes. Thermodynamic, kinetic, molecular spectroscopic and molecular theoretical methods were used. In 1993, the FG was renamed to "Interfacial Thermodynamics and Kinetics / Adsorbate Structure" and at the same time took up the WG "Molecular Spectroscopy". From 1994 H. Böhlig took over the leadership of the group, which was dissolved in 1998.

The FG "Thermodynamics" was headed by Konrad Quitzsch. The research of the FG was concerned with the physicochemical characterization of surfactant systems and micellar structures and microemulsions with simultaneous treatment of phase equilibria. In addition, the staff of this FG dealt with liquid-vapor equilibria, interfacial properties, and pollutant removal issues. After reunification, the FG placed great emphasis on presenting its research in the "old" German states and internationally and on entering into cooperative ventures.

The FG "Electron and X-ray Spectroscopy" was first headed by Armin Meisel, then from 1991 by Rüdiger Szargan. The FG benefited greatly from the opening to the West, for example, thanks to support from the state, federal and EU (with their funding instruments BMBF, DFG and DAAD), lecture invitations from abroad, collaborations on synchrotron radiation with laboratories worldwide and the like could be implemented. Numerous new instruments were also acquired, including the still-operating ESCALAB 220iXL photoelectron spectrometer, an IM5d electrochemical impedance measurement system, and an ASAP 2010 volumetric gas adsorption system. The group was primarily involved in spectroscopy, electron diffraction, and scanning tunneling and atomic force microscopy.

Overall, the entire scientific field of physical chemistry benefited greatly from the opening after the GDR era with generous funding, and the removal of travel restrictions. This made publications in internationally respected journals possible, as well as international collaborations and invitations to lecture.

From 1993, the department of "Theoretical Chemistry" also belonged to the institute, which Joachim Reinhold headed from 1991. From 1992, two professorships for Theoretical Chemistry were created, of which Reinhold held one. His research, at this time, dealt for example with the topics: Electronic and geometric structures, stability and reactivity of single- and multinuclear coordination compounds, mechanisms of reactions at transition metal centers, and investigation of the properties of adsorbate complexes of molecules on surfaces. In addition, the FG conducted research on topics such as: Energy spectra and magnetic properties of 1D and 2D molecular ensembles of extended aromatic hydrocarbons with defects or on ternary and quaternary A(III)-B(V) semiconductor solid solutions.

The second professorship formally created in 1992 was occupied by Cornelius Weiss. Since he was rector of the University of Leipzig from 1991, this professorship contributed little to research or teaching activities at the institute.

After the retirement of Konrad Quitzsch in 1998, the institute was divided into the three working groups Physical Chemistry I, Physical Chemistry II and Theoretical Chemistry.

The professorship Physical Chemistry I was held by Harald Morgner from 1999. His main field of work was the investigation of liquid surfaces with methods of vacuum-assisted surface analysis. Through the work in this group, Gibb's equation could be used for the first time to determine the chemical potential of surfactants as a function of their concentration without model assumptions. A new structural description of the surfaces of solutions was also found, which is useful for computer simulation of liquids, for example. The experimental methods were later applied not only to the surfaces of solutions, but also to study other soft matter systems. In March 2014, the professorship was filled by Knut R. Asmis, who became director of the Wilhelm Ostwald Institute from 2015 to 2020.

The Physical Chemistry II group was headed by Prof. Rüdiger Szargan until 2006. In this group, work on electron and X-ray spectroscopy and surface analysis was continued. Various projects brought, for example, new instrumental possibilities for electron evaporation, new techniques for scanning microscopy and insights into adsorption. Electrochemical and enzymatic reactions at laterally structured semiconductor surfaces and interfaces in electrolyte were also explored. In 2001, the institute received a new photoelectron spectrometer, which brought success in the field of spectroscopic surface research, for example, clarifying aspects of charge transport in semiconductor heterostructures with band discontinuities. In 2007, the professorship was filled by Reinhard Denecke.

The professorship for Theoretical Chemistry was held by Joachim Reinhold until his retirement in 2006. After her appointment to the professorship of Theoretical Chemistry, Barbara Kirchner took over the leadership of this research group in 2007. From 2007 onwards, a methodological reorientation towards first-principles simulations took place. The aim of the research was the development, provision and application of a theoretical chemistry laboratory with which theoretical investigations of chemically complex systems can be carried out. Computers are used to describe microscopic sequences of chemical processes in oversized systems and in condensed phase. The research area combines traditional molecular dynamics with first-principles quantum chemistry.

From 2015 to 2018, Thomas Heine held the professorship of Theoretical Chemistry. In his research group, research was conducted on a wide variety of topics. An important focus was method development, i.e., the development of "computational tools" to describe chemical and physical phenomena at the atomic level. Another central research topic was theoretical studies of ultrathin materials, which should enable simplified fabrication of circuits and other complex structures by tailored 2D layers, as well as metal-organic frameworks (MOFs), which among other things show high potential as quantum sieves, for catalysis, as sensors, and as proton and electrical conductors. Furthermore, the Heine group was involved in the development of the density-functional-based tight-binding (DFTB) theory. Professor Heine moved to the TU Dresden in 2018. After Heine's appointment at TU Dresden, the professorship for Theoretical Chemistry was not filled again until March 2020, in the meantime Carsten Baldauf from the Fritz - Haber - Institute in Berlin had a corresponding teaching assignment.

After the fall of the Berlin Wall in the 1990s, the AG of Prof. O. Brede at the Academy of Sciences of the GDR was transferred to an external Max Planck Group in Leipzig on the "Campus Permoserstrasse 15", which was financed by the Max Planck Society until 2007. After the retirement of Prof. O. Brede, a new professorship for reaction dynamics was created at the Wilhelm Ostwald Institute and filled by Prof. Bernd Abel, who previously researched and taught in Göttingen. Between 2010 and 2015, Prof. Abel served as Institute Director of the Wilhelm Ostwald Institute. From 2012, Prof. Abel then also served as department head and deputy director at the Leibniz Institute for Surface Modification (IOM) in a joint appointment between the University of Leipzig and IOM. During this time, he also accepted the professorship for Technical Chemistry of Polymers (Technical Chemistry).

=== Notable conferences ===
- 1993: "Bunsentagung", 92nd General Meeting of the German Bunsen Society for Physical Chemistry.
- 1994: "European Conference on Surface Science", ECOSS 14
- 1994: Annual Meeting of the Society for Thermal Analysis, GEFTA'94, incl. opening lecture by K. Quitzsch
- 2000: Conference "Applied Surface Analysis", AOFA 12
- 2012: 111th General Meeting of the German Bunsen Society for Physical Chemistry e.V. on the topic "Ionic Liquids" (organization: B. Abel et al.)

== Current research ==
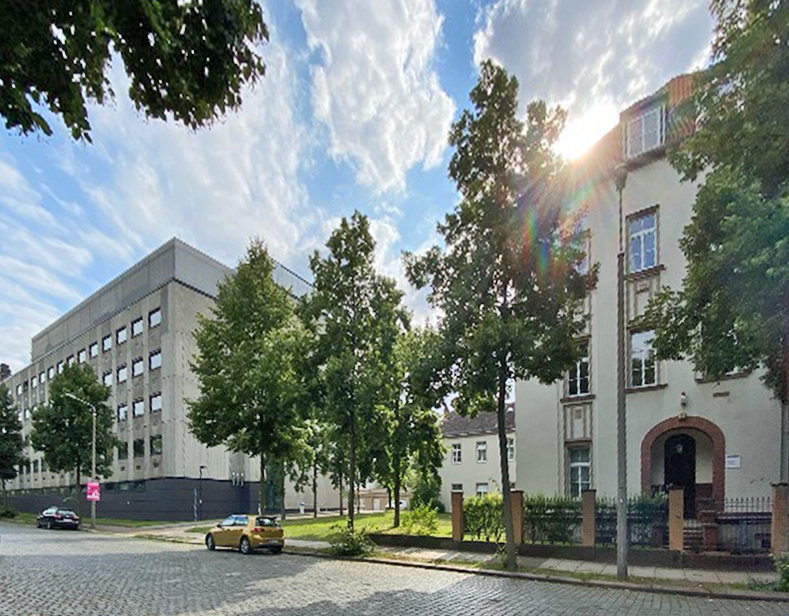
Wilhelm-Ostwald-Institut, in the background Technikum Analytikum (2021)

Currently, there are five working groups at the Wilhelm Ostwald Institute. Prof. Reinhard Denecke is the institute's current director, since 2019.

- The working group led by Prof. Reinhard Denecke focuses on the investigation of surfaces in order to answer questions in research fields such as heterogeneous catalysis and the interaction of molecules at interfaces. Electron- and X-ray spectroscopy are used for this purpose. Potential applications include rational designs of absorbents or the conversion of biomass to fuel, where catalysts are used to ensure high energy efficiency.
- The research group led by Prof. Bernd Abel focuses on topics in the field of molecular physical chemistry and on materials and methods for sensor and energy applications. In doing so, the AG uses and develops new analytical methods of spectroscopy, mass spectrometry and microscopy with its cooperation partners. The activities also have the purpose of gaining fundamental knowledge about matter and materials in order to then transfer these to industry for sensor and energy applications. Between 2012 and 2021, the Functional Surfaces Department (Head: Prof. Abel) at the Leibniz Institute for Surface Modification (IOM) focused on the research and development of sensory, responsive and functional interfaces of matter in current and future fields of application and action. As of April 2022, Bernd Abel is no longer a member of WOI and IOM, but has moved to the Institute of Technical Chemistry at the University of Leipzig.
- The research group of Prof. Knut Asmis investigates isolated, nanoscale particles in the gas phase with the aim of closing the knowledge gap between the gas phase and condensed matter. Therefore, methods for characterizing the structure, reactivity, and dynamics of clusters, nanoparticles, and fluid interfaces are developed and improved using state-of-the-art mass spectrometric and laser spectroscopic techniques. A particular interest is the study of nuclear quantum effects of hydrogen isotopes, ion solvation, spectroscopic characterization of strong hydrogen bonds, proton transport through hydrogen-bridged networks, deciphering the active species in heterogeneous catalysis, and an atomic understanding of the extraordinary properties of boron-containing compounds.
- The research group of Prof. Ralf Tonner-Zech deals with molecular concepts of chemical bonds and their reactivity in order to apply them to material science questions by studying atomic and electronic structures. For this purpose, primarily density functional theory methods are used, but also wave function based methods. The goal is to develop and improve materials with individually desired properties.
- The junior research group led by Dr. Jonas Warneke conducts research on the chemistry of highly reactive molecular fragment ions. The aim is to use charged molecules and their fragments, which are generated in a mass spectrometer, for the synthesis of new molecules and condensed matter. For this purpose, gaseous ions are landed on surfaces and accumulated. The development of fundamentally new methods of chemical bond formation and the preparation of new layered materials on surfaces with potential applications in catalysis, electrochemistry, and nanostructuring on surfaces are the goal. Dr. Warneke is also the head of the Laboratory for Molecular Ion Deposition at the IOM in Leipzig. In March 2022, he was awarded the prestigious Heinz Maier - Leibniz Prize by the DFG. The prize is considered the most important award in Germany for scientists in early career phases and is endowed with 20,000 euros. The award ceremony took place on 3 May 2022 in Berlin. Warneke received it for his work on superelectrophilic anions, the further development of the "ion soft landing" method, which laid the foundation for his discovery of self-assembling layers, and the material synthesis with molecular fragment ions that he developed.

=== Participation in collaborative projects ===
- The research groups Asmis, Warneke, Tonner and Abel are involved in the Research Training Group 123H.
- The research groups Abel and Warneke are part of the Collaborative Research Center TRR102 "Polymers under Multiple Constraints".
- The Denecke working group was part of the SFB 762 "Functionality of oxide interfaces" from 2008 to 2019.

== Directors ==
- Wilhelm Ostwald (1897 – 1906)
- Max Le Blanc (1906 – 1933)
- Wilhelm Carl Böttger (1933 – 1934)
- Karl Friedrich Bonhoeffer (1934 – 1947)
- Herbert Staude (1947 – 1959)
- Gerhard Geiseler (1960 – 1968)

Between 1968 and 1991 the institute was a part of the chemistry section of the University of Leipzig, the directors of this section did not all come from physical chemistry.

From 1991 the term "section" was replaced by "department". From 1993 the institute existed independently again. Since that time the institute directors were elected and took over the post in an executive capacity for a limited period of time.

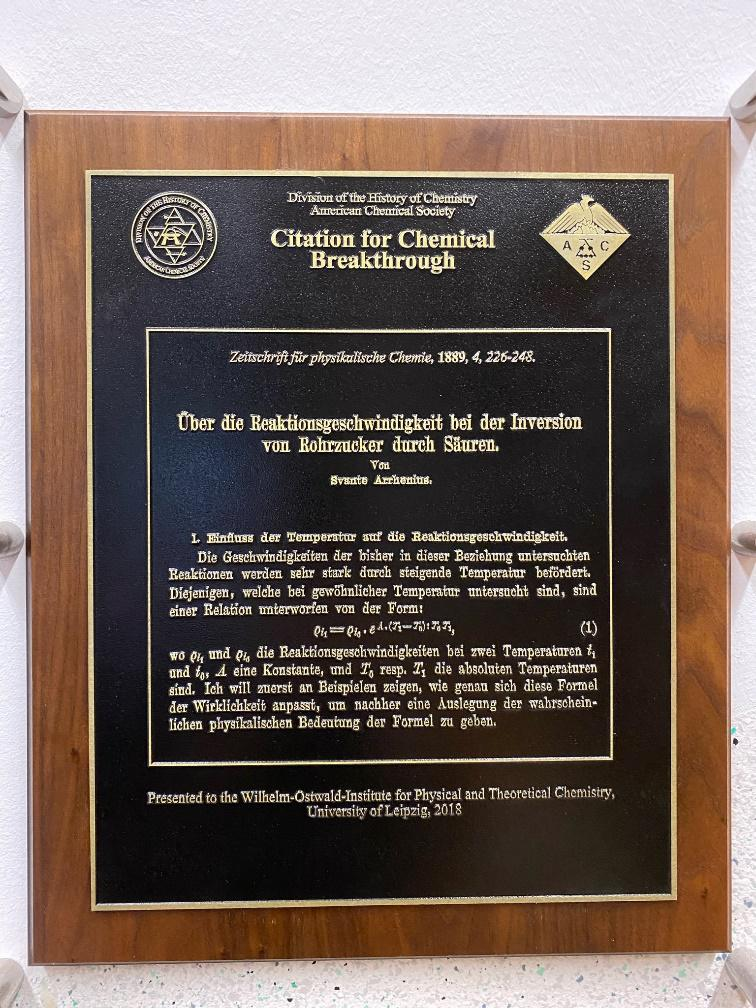
Certificate on the occasion of the Citations for Chemical Breakthrough Award, 2018, for the discovery of the Arrhenius equation.

- Konrad Quitzsch (1993 – 1998)
- Joachim Reinhold (1998–2002)
- Rüdiger Szargan (2003 – 2006)
- Harald Morgner (2006 – 2010)
- Bernd Abel (2010–2015)
- Knut Asmis (2015–2019)
- Reinhard Denecke (since 2019)

== Awards ==
- 1909, Nobel Prize in Chemistry to Wilhelm Ostwald for his work on catalysis and studies on equilibrium conditions and reaction rates.
- 2018, Citations for Chemical Breakthrough Award from the American Chemical Society for the work of Svante Arrhenius on his Arrhenius equation, carried out and published at the Wilhelm Ostwald Institute in 1888/89.
- 2022, Heinz Maier - Leibniz - Prize from the German Research Foundation for Jonas Warneke for his work on superelectrophilic anions, the further development of the "Ion Soft Landing" method, which laid the foundation for his discovery on self-assembling layers, and the material synthesis with molecular fragment ions that he developed.
