= McLeansboro Group =

- Stratigraphic range: Carboniferous
- Type: Group
- Sub-units: Shelburn Formation, Patoka Formation, Bond Formation, Mattoon Formation

Location
- Region: Indiana, Illinois, Kentucky
- Country: United States

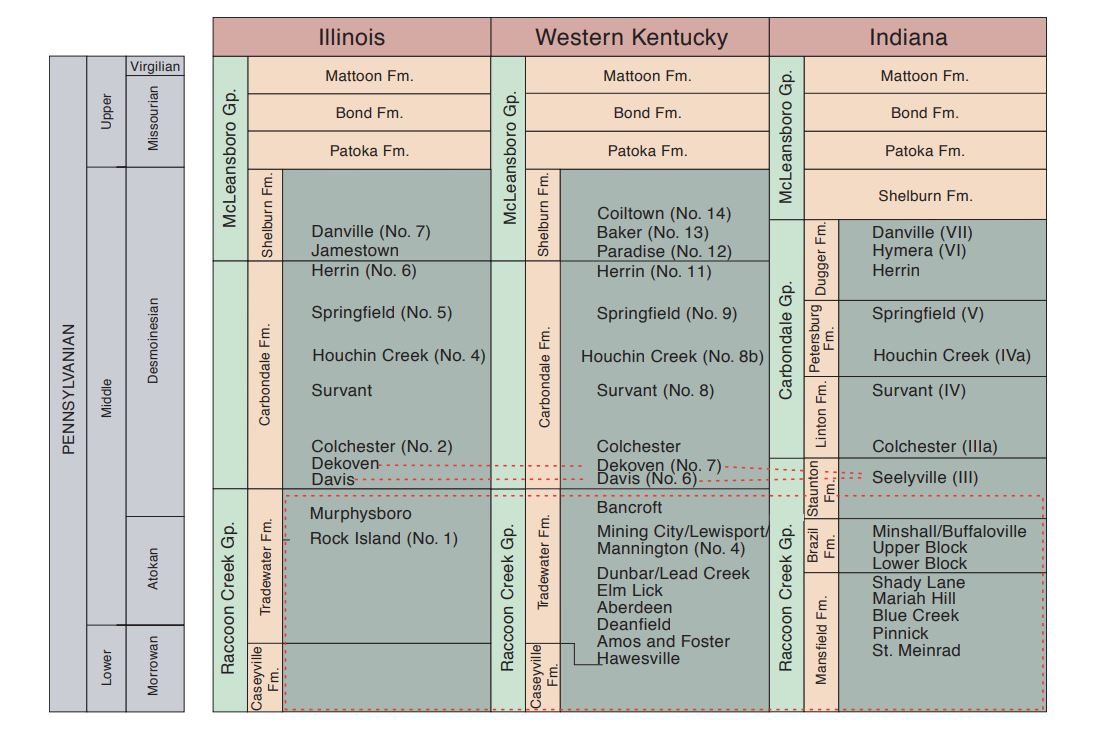
Illinois Basin Pennsylvanian stratigraphy

The McLeansboro Group is a geologic group in Indiana, Illinois and Kentucky. It preserves fossils dating back to the Carboniferous period.

== See also ==
- List of fossiliferous stratigraphic units in Indiana
