= Verdigris Formation =

Geologic formation

- Stratigraphic range: Carboniferous
- Type: Formation

Location
- Region: Illinois
- Country: United States

The Verdigris Formation is a geologic formation that outcrops in Illinois. It preserves fossils dating back to the Carboniferous period. It is a limestone that was deposited after the Skinner Sandstone in central Oklahoma.

== See also ==
- List of fossiliferous stratigraphic units in Illinois
