= Golconda Group =

Geological group in Illinois, USA

- Stratigraphic range: Carboniferous
- Type: Group

Location
- Region: Illinois, Kentucky
- Country: United States

The Golconda Group is a geologic group in Illinois. It preserves fossils dating back to the Carboniferous period.

== See also ==
- List of fossiliferous stratigraphic units in Illinois
