= Little Cedar Formation =

Geologic formation in the United States

- Stratigraphic range: Devonian
- Type: Formation
- Sub-units: Hinkle Member, Eagle Center Member

Location
- Region: Illinois
- Country: United States

The Little Cedar Formation is a geologic formation in Illinois. It preserves fossils dating back to the Devonian period.

== See also ==
- List of fossiliferous stratigraphic units in Illinois
