= Mattoon Formation =

Geological formation in Illinois, USA

- Stratigraphic range: Pennsylvanian
- Type: Formation
- Unit of: McLeansboro Group
- Overlies: Bond Formation

Location
- Region: Illinois and Indiana
- Country: United States

The Mattoon Formation is a geologic formation in Illinois. It preserves fossils dating back to the Carboniferous period.

== See also ==
- List of fossiliferous stratigraphic units in Illinois

== Bibliography ==
- "Fossilworks: Gateway to the Paleobiology Database". Archived from the original on 25 March 2022.
