= St. Laurent Formation =

Geologic formation in Illinois, United States

- Stratigraphic range: Devonian
- Type: Formation

Location
- Region: Illinois
- Country: United States

The St. Laurent Formation is a geologic formation in Illinois. It preserves fossils dating back to the Devonian period.

== See also ==
- List of fossiliferous stratigraphic units in Illinois
