= Bernd Abel =

German chemist (born 1960)

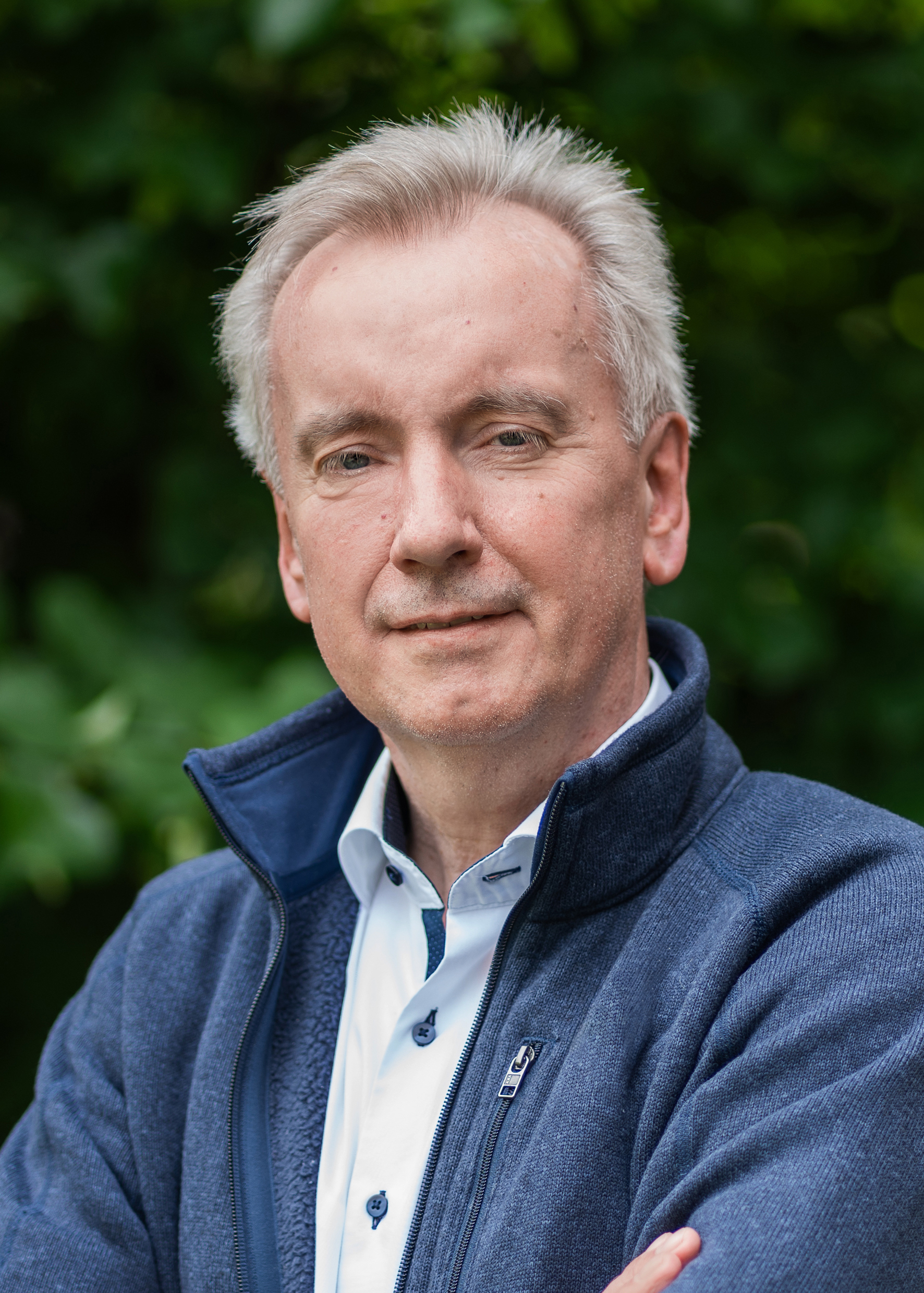
- Born: 1960 (age 65–66); Delmenhorst, West Germany
- Education: University of Göttingen (doctorate and habilitation)
- Occupations: chemist and university professor
- Known for: physical chemistry of complex systems and technologies

Bernd Abel (born 1960) is a German chemist specializing in applied physical chemistry. He holds the Chair of Chemical Technology of Polymers at Leipzig University, and since 2025 he also serves as the ERA Chair holder and department head at the J. Heyrovsky Institute of Physical Chemistry of the Czech Academy of Sciences in Prague.

== Personal life ==
Abel was born in 1960 in Delmenhorst, West Germany.

== Career ==
Abel studied chemistry at University of Göttingen starting in 1982 and completed his degree with a diploma in 1986. In 1990, he received his doctorate in Göttingen under Jürgen Troe with a dissertation on the investigation of the dynamics of molecules following IR multiphoton excitation. He then spent three years at the George Harrison Spectroscopy Laboratory at the Massachusetts Institute of Technology. From 1994 onward, Abel was a research scientist and group leader at the Institute of Physical Chemistry at University of Göttingen, where he also completed his habilitation in Physical Chemistry in 1999. Beginning in 2002, he served as an associate professor of Physical Chemistry in Göttingen.

In 2008, Abel was appointed to the Chair of Physical Chemistry/Reaction Dynamics at the Wilhelm Ostwald Institute. From 2010 to 2015, he served as the managing director of the Wilhelm Ostwald Institute. From 2012 to 2022, Abel was head of the Chemical Department at the Leibniz Institute of Surface Engineering, where he also served as deputy director during that time, while simultaneously holding a professorship in Technical Chemistry at Leipzig University. Since 2022, Abel has held the Chair of Chemical Technology of Polymers at Leipzig University and leads an interdisciplinary research group working at the interfaces of chemistry, physics, and engineering, investigating the physical and chemical properties of complex materials and systems.

Over the course of his research career, Abel has been a visiting scientist at various international universities, In April 2025, in addition to his position in Leipzig, Abel was appointed ERA Chair holder and head of the "Space Chemistry and Technology" department at the Jaroslav Heyrovský Institute of Physical Chemistry of the Czech Academy of Sciences.

== Research ==
Abel's scientific focus is the physical and chemical properties of complex materials at the interfaces between chemistry, physics, and engineering. The goal is to understand fundamental processes and to apply this knowledge to new technologies and materials. Further research topics include nanomaterials, surface and interfacial processes, soft matter (such as polymers and colloids) as well as quantum chemistry and simulation. These activities are complemented by spectroscopic analyses for investigating chemical dynamics and by work on materials for energy conversion and storage, such as for solar cells, batteries, and fuel cells.

Abel and his team has also developed instruments for future space missions based on high-resolution mass spectrometry. For thus experiments are carried out which simulate the conditions near the icy moons of Jupiter and Saturn and provide data that is relevant, for example, for missions such as the space probe mission Europa Clipper (launched in 2024).

Besides his research activities, Abel has served since 2022 as chairman of the board of the Wilhelm Ostwald Society (Wilhelm-Ostwald-Gesellschaft e.V.). He is also an editor of the journal Zeitschrift für Physikalische Chemie.

== Awards ==
- 1999: Sir Harold Thompson Memorial Award, awarded by the magazine Spectrochimica Acta Part A
- 2001: Nernst-Haber-Bodenstein-Preis, by the Deutsche Bunsen-Gesellschaft für Physikalische Chemie
- 2007: Göttingen Innovation Award
- 2022 Chairperson of the board of the Wilhelm-Ostwald Institute
