= Bond Formation =

Geologic formation in Illinois

- Stratigraphic range: Pennsylvanian
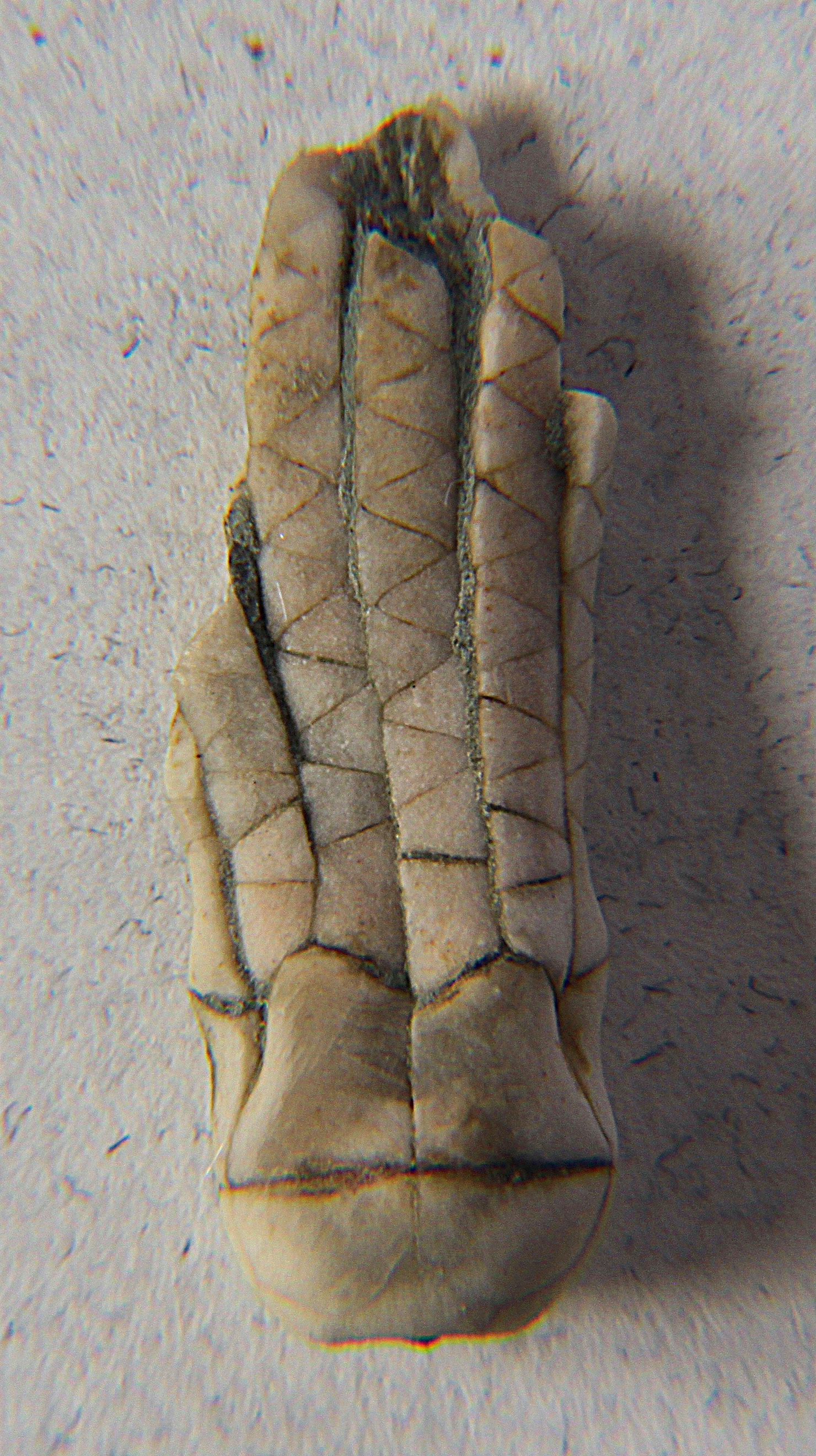
- Erisocrinus fossil from the Bond Formation
- Type: Formation
- Unit of: McLeansboro Group
- Sub-units: Lasalle Limestone Member
- Underlies: Mattoon Formation
- Overlies: Patoka Formation

Location
- Region: Illinois, Kentucky and Indiana
- Country: United States

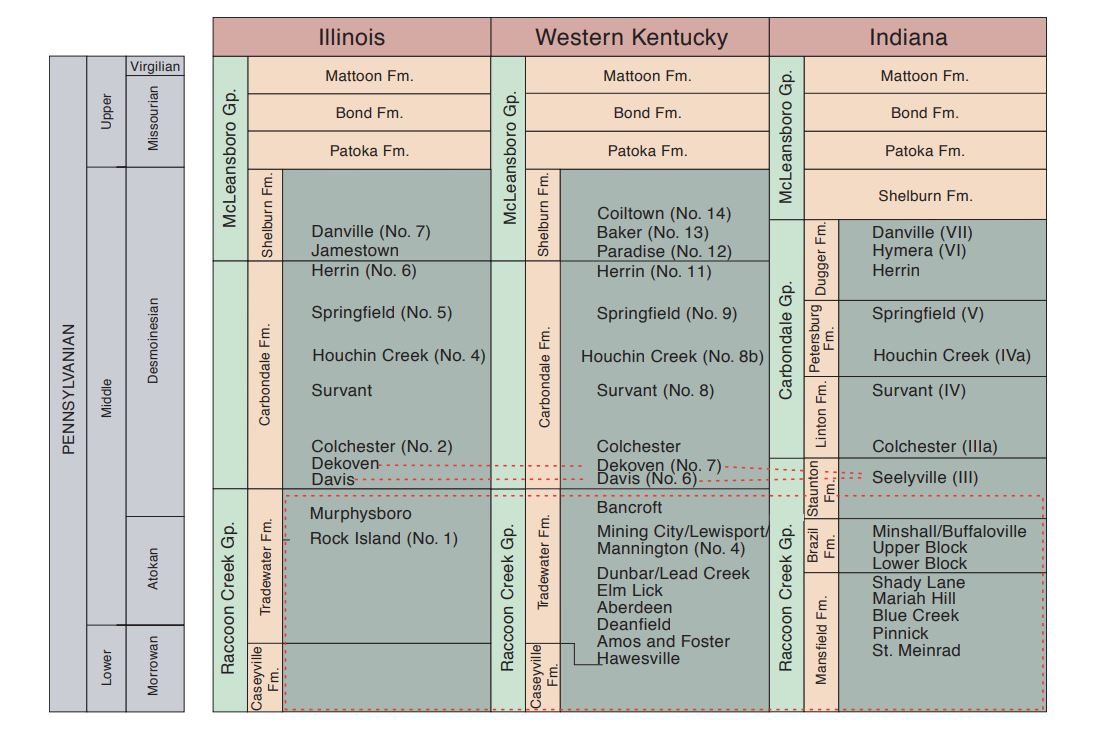
Illinois Basin stratigraphy incl. Bond Formation

The Bond Formation is a geologic formation in Illinois, Kentucky and Indiana. It preserves fossils dating back to the Carboniferous period.

== See also ==
- List of fossiliferous stratigraphic units in Illinois
