= English River (ship) =

Canadian lake freighter and bulk carrier, launched in 1961

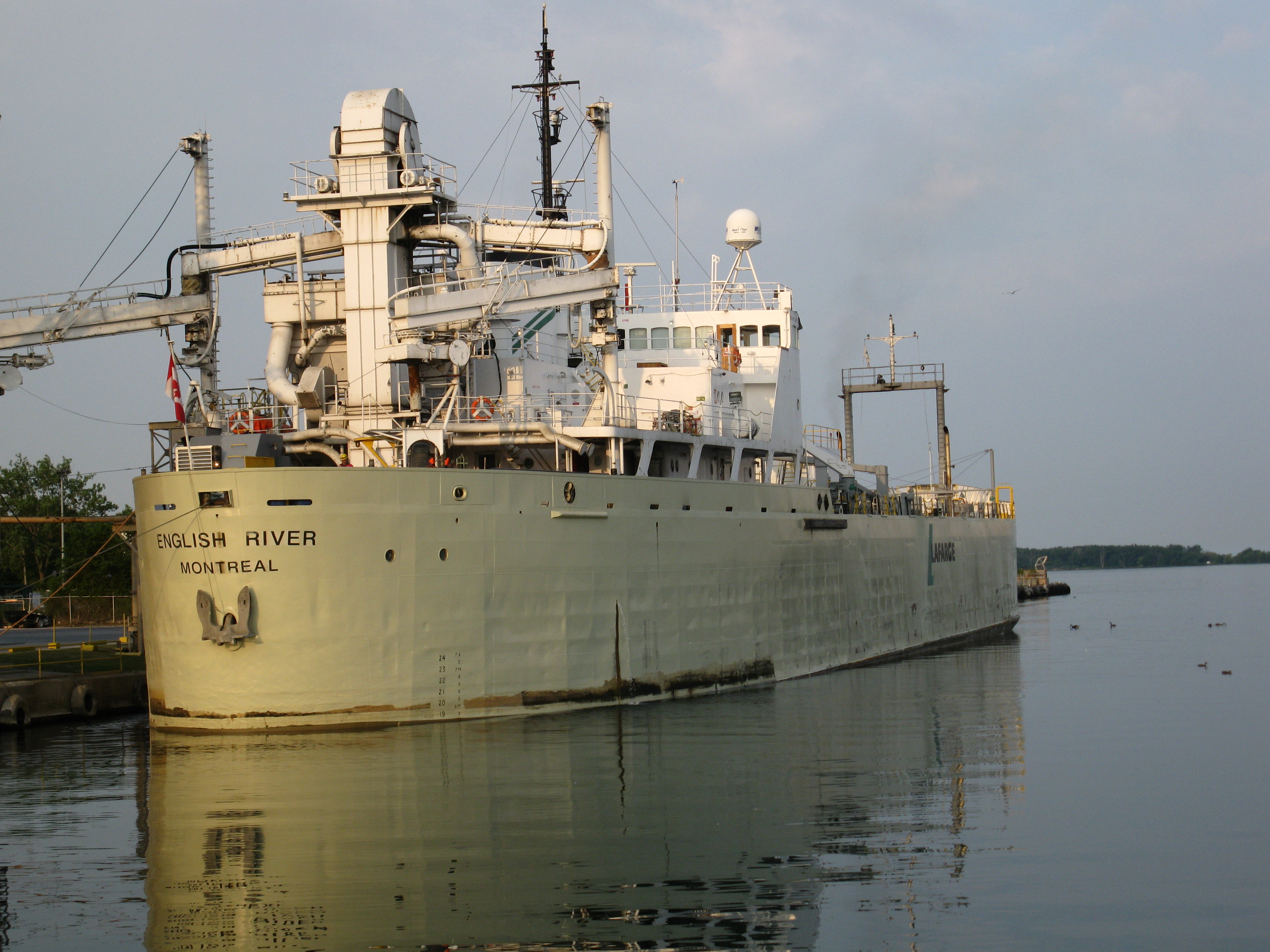
- English River moored by the Lafarge terminal in the Polson slip in Toronto.

History
- Name: English River
- Owner: Canadian General Electric (1961–1963); Canada Steamship Lines (1963–1973); Laurentide Financial (1973–1992); Canada Cement Lafarge (1992–2018)
- Operator: Canada Steamship Lines (1961–2016); Algoma Central (2017–2018)
- Builder: Collingwood Shipyards, Collingwood, Ontario
- Laid down: 20 March 1961
- Launched: 8 September 1961
- Completed: October 1961
- In service: 1962
- Out of service: 2018
- Identification: IMO number: 5104382; MMSI number: 316001837; Callsign: CYLX
- Fate: Scrapped in 2018

General characteristics
- Type: Cement carrier
- Tonnage: 6,729 GT; 7,362 DWT
- Length: 123.5 m (405 ft 2 in) oa; 116.1 m (380 ft 11 in) pp
- Beam: 18.4 m (60 ft 4 in)
- Depth: 11.13 m (36 ft 6 in)
- Installed power: 1 × Werkspoor TMAB-390 8-cylinder diesel engine
- Propulsion: 1 propeller, 1,850 bhp (1,380 kW)
- Speed: 12 knots (22 km/h; 14 mph)
- Capacity: 5,284 t (5,201 long tons; 5,825 short tons)

English River was a lake freighter and bulk carrier, launched in 1961 by Collingwood Shipyards of Collingwood, Ontario. In her initial years she carried bulk cargoes and deck cargoes to smaller ports on the Great Lakes and Saint Lawrence River watershed and estuary. In 1973, the vessel was converted into a cement carrier and carried mainly raw cement for the construction industry. The ship continued to operate until English River was removed from service and sold for scrap.

== Description ==
English River was constructed as a St. Lawrence Seaway package freighter operating on the Seaway and the Great Lakes. Her size was limited and the ship was 123.5 metres (405 ft 2 in) long overall and 116.1 m (380 ft 11 in) between perpendiculars with a beam of 18.4 m (60 ft 4 in) and a hull depth of 11.13 m (36 ft 6 in). The ship was initially measured at 6,639 gross register tons (GRT) and 5,035 tons deadweight (DWT). After conversion to a cement carrier in 1973, English River was remeasured at 6,729 gross tonnage (GT) and 7,362 DWT. (Note: The Miramar Ship Index has the ship at 6,730 GT.)

The ship was powered by a Werkspoor TMAB-390 8-cylinder diesel engine burning marine diesel oil turning one controllable pith propeller, rated at 1,380 kilowatts (1,850 bhp). English River's service speed was 12 knots (22 km/h; 14 mph) The ship initially had capacity for 5,284 metric tons (5,201 long tons; 5,825 short tons) of bulk goods. After the 1973 conversion, where English River had self-unloading equipment installed to aid her in unloading concrete, the vessel's capacity increased to 7,570 metric tons (7,450 long tons; 8,340 short tons).

== Construction and career ==
The vessel was laid down on 20 March 1961 by Collingwood Shipyards in Collingwood, Ontario with the yard number 171. The ship was launched on 8 September 1961 and completed in October. Initially owned by Canadian General Electric and registered in Collingwood, however they never operated the vessel. English River was bareboat chartered to Canada Steamship Lines (CSL) immediately. CSL bought the vessel in 1963 as a better highway system around the Great Lakes led to a decline in package freight demand.

In 1973, the vessel was converted into a cement carrier and equipped with self-unloading equipment by Port Arthur Shipbuilding in what is now Thunder Bay, Ontario. After the conversion was complete, ownership of English River was acquired by Laurentide Financial Corporation of Vancouver, British Columbia, with CSL remaining as managers. English River returned to service in late 1973, chartered to Canada Cement Lafarge. In 1984, ownership of the cement carrier changed to National Bank Leasing, returning to CSL's ownership in 1989, and the ship was registered in Montreal, Quebec. Canada Cement Lafarge continued chartering the ship until 1993, when English River was purchased by the company, but remained under CSL's management.

In 1996 she collided with a dock in Cleveland, Ohio. In 2012 an employee of Port Weller Dry Docks was seriously injured when he fell 10 metres (33 ft) into her hold in a shipyard in Port Weller, Ontario.

In 2017–2018, the vessel was managed by Algoma Central for Lafarge. English River was taken out of service in 2018 to be sold for scrap. The ship was sold to International Marine Salvage on 21 July 2018 and taken to Port Colborne, Ontario to be broken up. However, the hull was still extent as of 8 May 2020.
