= Shelburn Formation =

Geologic formation in the United States

- Stratigraphic range: Pennsylvanian
- Type: Formation
- Unit of: McLeansboro Group
- Underlies: Patoka Formation
- Overlies: Dugger Formation

Location
- Region: Illinois and Indiana
- Country: United States

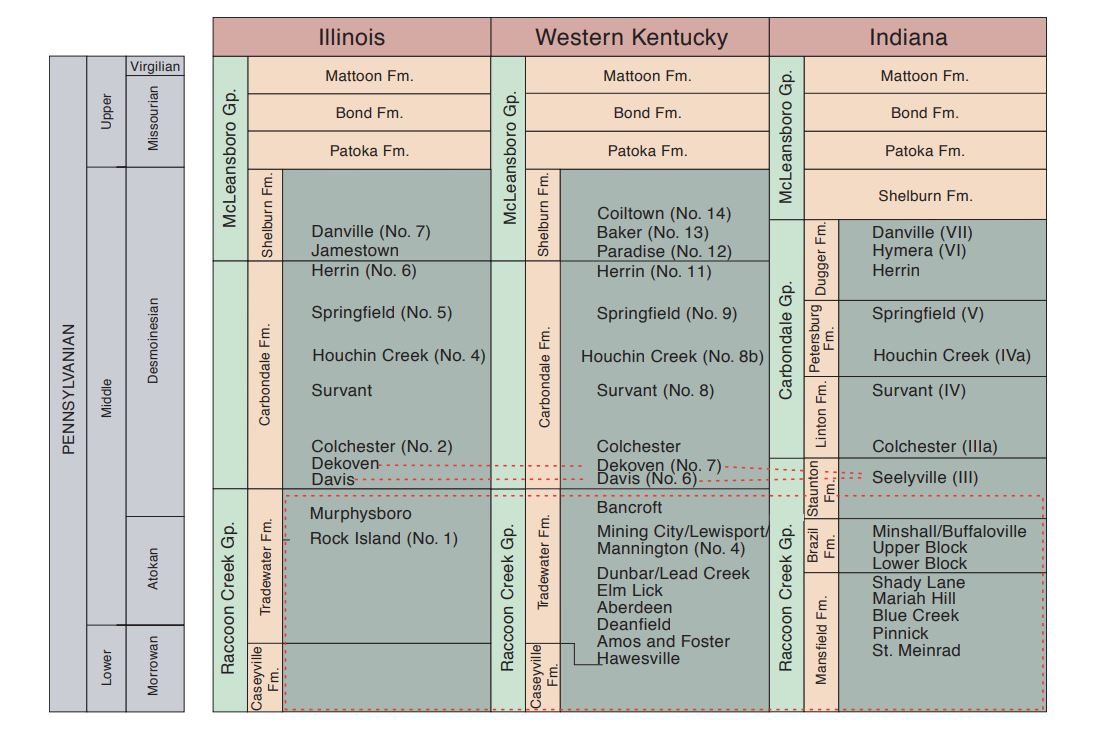
Illinois Basin Pennsylvanian stratigraphy

The Shelburn Formation is a geologic formation in Indiana. It preserves fossils dating back to the Carboniferous period.

== See also ==
- List of fossiliferous stratigraphic units in Indiana
