= Fort Atkinson Formation =

- Stratigraphic range: Ordovician
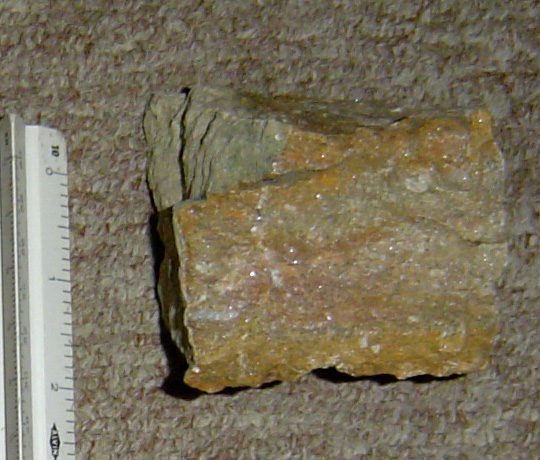
- Rock sample from the Fort Atkinson Formation
- Type: Formation
- Unit of: Maquoketa Group

Location
- Region: Wisconsin
- Country: United States

The Fort Atkinson Formation is a geologic formation in Wisconsin. It preserves fossils dating back to the Ordovician period.

== See also ==
- List of fossiliferous stratigraphic units in Wisconsin
- Paleontology in Wisconsin
