= Lake Church Formation =

Geologic formation in Wisconsin, US

- Stratigraphic range: Devonian
- Type: Formation

Location
- Region: Wisconsin
- Country: United States

The Lake Church Formation is a geologic formation in Wisconsin. It preserves fossils dating back to the Devonian period.

== See also ==
- List of fossiliferous stratigraphic units in Wisconsin
- Paleontology in Wisconsin
