= Wabaunsee Group =

Geologic group in Kansas, United States

- Stratigraphic range: Gzhelian (Virgilian stage)
- Type: Group
- Unit of: Virgilian series
- Sub-units: Wood Siding Formation; Root Shale; Stotler Limestone; Pillsbury Shale; Zeandale Limestone; Willard Shale; Emporia Limestone; Auburn Shale; Bern Limestone; Scranton Shale; Howard Limestone; Severy Shale
- Underlies: Admire Group
- Overlies: Shawnee Group

Lithology
- Primary: Cyclothems of limestone and shale
- Other: Mudstone, sand, coal

Location
- Region: Kansas
- Country: United States

Type section
- Named for: Wabaunsee County, Kansas
- Named by: C.S. Prosser
- Year defined: 1895

The Wabaunsee Group is a Late-Carboniferous geologic group in Kansas, extending into Nebraska, Iowa, Missouri, and Oklahoma. The unit is recognized in the subsurface by drillers in Colorado as Wabaunsee Formation.

In locations, some upper members are not present due to a series of erosions that occurred in late-Pennsylvanian time.

== See also ==
- List of fossiliferous stratigraphic units in Kansas
- Paleontology in Kansas
