= List of fossiliferous stratigraphic units in Kansas =

This article contains a list of fossil-bearing stratigraphic units in the state of Kansas, U.S.

== Sites ==
Group or Formation	Period	Notes
Admire Formation	Carboniferous	
Admire Group/Falls City Limestone	Carboniferous	
Admire Group/Janesville Shale	Carboniferous	
Admire Group/Onaga Shale	Carboniferous	
Altamont Formation	Carboniferous	
Americus Formation	Carboniferous	
Ballard Formation	Pleistocene	
Beattie Formation	Permian	
Belleville Formation		
Belvidere Formation	Cretaceous	
Boone Formation	Carboniferous	
Bronson Group/Hertha Formation	Carboniferous	
Carlile Shale	Cretaceous	
Cass Limestone		
Chase Formation	Permian	
Chase Group/Barneston Limestone	Permian	
Chase Group/Funston Limestone	Permian	
Chase Group/Matfield Shale	Permian	
Chase Group/Speiser Shale	Permian	
Chase Group/Winfield Formation	Permian	
Chase Group/Wreford Limestone	Permian	
Cherokee Shale	Carboniferous	
Cherokee Group/Cabaniss Formation	Carboniferous	
Cherokee Group/Riverton Coal Formation	Carboniferous	
Cheyenne Sandstone	Cretaceous	
Coffeyville Formation	Carboniferous	
Collier Shale	Cambrian	
Colorado Group/Carlile Shale	Cretaceous	
Colorado Group/Graneros Shale	Cretaceous	
Colorado Group/Greenhorn Limestone	Cretaceous	
Colorado Group/Niobrara Formation	Cretaceous	
Comanche Formation	Cretaceous	
Comanche Group/Kiowa Shale	Cretaceous	
Cottonwood Limestone	Permian	
Council Grove Group/Beattie Formation	Permian	
Council Grove Group/Crouse Formation	Permian	
Council Grove Group/Eskridge Shale	Permian	
Council Grove Group/Foraker Formation	Permian, Carboniferous	
Council Grove Group/Grenola Formation	Permian	
Council Grove Group/Johnson Shale	Carboniferous	
Council Grove Group/Red Eagle Formation	Permian, Carboniferous	
Council Grove Group/Roca Shale	Permian	
Crooked Creek Formation		
Crouse Formation	Permian	
Dakota Formation	Cretaceous	
Dennis Formation	Carboniferous	
Dewey Formation	Carboniferous	
Douglas Group/Stranger Formation		
Eiss Formation	Permian	
Elmdale Formation	Carboniferous	
Eskridge Shale	Permian	
Falls City Limestone		
Fencepost limestone bed	Cretaceous	
Florena Formation	Permian	
Foraker Formation	Carboniferous	
Fort Hays Limestone Member	Cretaceous	
Fort Riley Formation	Permian	
Fort Scott Limestone	Carboniferous	
Garrison Formation	Permian	
Greenhorn Limestone	Cretaceous	
Grenola Formation	Permian	
Grenola Limestone	Permian	
Hale Formation	Carboniferous	
Hartford Limestone	Carboniferous	
Havensville Formation	Permian	
Hepler Unit	Carboniferous	
Herington Formation	Permian	
Hertha Formation	Carboniferous	
Hollenberg Formation	Permian	
Howard Formation	Carboniferous	
Iatan Formation	Carboniferous	
Iola Formation	Carboniferous	
Janesville Shale		
Kansas City Group/Drum Formation	Carboniferous	
Kansas City Group/Iola Formation	Carboniferous	
Kansas City Group/Westerville Formation	Carboniferous	
Kansas City Group/Wyandotte Formation	Carboniferous	
Kanwaka Formation		
Kingsdown Formation	Pleistocene	
Kiowa Shale	Cretaceous	
Lansing Group/Plattsburg Formation	Carboniferous	
Lansing Group/Stanton Formation	Carboniferous	
Lansing Group/Vilas Shale	Carboniferous	
Lawrence Formation/Lawrence Shale	Carboniferous	
Lost Branch Formation	Carboniferous	
Marmaton Group/Altamount Formation	Carboniferous	
Marmaton Group/Fort Scott Formation	Carboniferous	
McPherson Formation		
Meade Formation		
Memorial Formation	Carboniferous	
Montana Group/Pierre Shale	Cretaceous	
Neva Formation	Permian	
Niobrara Formation	Cretaceous	
Nowata Formation	Carboniferous	
Ochelata Group/Wann Formation	Carboniferous	
Ogallala Formation	Neogene	
Oread Formation	Carboniferous	
Pawnee Formation	Carboniferous	
Pedee Group/Weston Shale	Carboniferous	
Pierre Shale	Cretaceous	
Pierre Shale Group/Sharon Springs Formation	Cretaceous	
Pillsbury Shale	Carboniferous	
Plattsburg Formation	Carboniferous	
Pleasanton Group/Seminole Formation	Carboniferous	
Red Eagle Formation	Permian	
Rexroad Formation	Neogene	
Roca Shale	Permian	
Root Shale		
Sappa Formation		
Schroyer Formation	Permian	
Seminole Formation	Carboniferous	
Shawnee Group/Calhouns Shale	Carboniferous	
Shawnee Group/Deer Creek Formation	Carboniferous	
Shawnee Group/Kanwaka Formation	Carboniferous	
Shawnee Group/Lecompton Formation	Carboniferous	
Shawnee Group/Oread Formation	Carboniferous	
Shawnee Group/Topeka Formation	Carboniferous	
Smoky Hill Chalk Formation	Cretaceous	
Speiser Shale	Permian	
Stanton Formation	Carboniferous	
Stotler Limestone	Carboniferous	
Stranger Formation	Carboniferous	
Sumner Group/Wellington Formation	Permian	
Sumner Group/Wreford Limestone	Permian	
Swope Formation	Carboniferous	
Tacket Formation	Carboniferous	
Threemile Formation	Permian	
Topeka Formation	Carboniferous	
Vanheim Formation	United States	
Verdigris Formation	Carboniferous	
Wabaunsee Formation	Carboniferous	
Wabaunsee Group/Auburn Formation	Carboniferous	
Wabaunsee Group/Brownville Formation	Carboniferous	
Wabaunsee Group/Burlingame Formation	Carboniferous	
Wabaunsee Group/Dover Formation	Carboniferous	
Wabaunsee Group/Emporia Formation	Carboniferous	
Wabaunsee Group/Falls City Formation	Carboniferous	
Wabaunsee Group/Howard Formation	Carboniferous	
Wabaunsee Group/Pillsbury Formation	Carboniferous	
Wabaunsee Group/Pillsbury Shale	Carboniferous	
Wabaunsee Group/Root Shale	Carboniferous	
Wabaunsee Group/Scranton Formation	Carboniferous	
Wabaunsee Group/Stotler Formation	Carboniferous	
Wabaunsee Group/Stotler Limestone	Carboniferous	
Wabaunsee Group/Tarkio Formation	Carboniferous	
Wabaunsee Group/Wakarusa Formation	Carboniferous	
Wabaunsee Group/Wood Siding Formation	Carboniferous	
Wellington Formation	Permian	
Winfield Formation	Permian	
Wood Siding Formation	Carboniferous	
Wyandotte Formation	Carboniferous	
Zeandale Limestone	Carboniferous	

== See also ==
- Paleontology in Kansas
