= Council Grove Group =

Geologic group in the United States

- Stratigraphic range: Carboniferous-Permian boundary
- Type: Group
- Sub-units: Speiser Shale Funston Limestone; Blue Rapids Shale; Crouse Limestone; Easly Creek Shale; Bader Formation; Stearns Shale; Beattie Limestone; Eskridge Shale; Grenola Limestone; Roca Shale; Red Eagle Limestone; Johnson Shale Foraker Limestone
- Underlies: Chase Group
- Overlies: Admire Group

Location
- Region: Midcontinent (Kansas, Nebraska, Oklahoma, Colorado (subsurface) )
- Country: United States

Type section
- Named for: Council Grove, Kansas

The Council Grove Group is a geologic group in Kansas, Oklahoma, and Nebraska as well as subsurface Colorado. It preserves fossils dating to the Carboniferous-Permian boundary. This group forms the foundations and lower ranges of the Flint Hills of Kansas, underlying the Chase Group that forms the highest ridges of the Flint Hills.

The Group particularly consists of megacyclothems alternating between massive mudstone paleosols and massive shallow marine limestone. The sequences of these alternations correlate with the ~400,000 year component of Milankovitch cycles. A number of the limestones have minor flint-filled marine animal burrows, anticipating the massive flint beds of the Chase Group.

With the exposure of the group's lower formations in the 1993 flooding, the entirety of the Council Grove Group, from hillcrest Speiser Shale down to pond-level Americus limestone, is exposed for study from top to bottom in the Tuttle Creek Lake Spillway.

== See also ==
- List of fossiliferous stratigraphic units in Kansas
- List of fossiliferous stratigraphic units in Nebraska
- List of fossiliferous stratigraphic units in Oklahoma
- Paleontology in Kansas
- Paleontology in Nebraska
- Paleontology in Oklahoma
