= Americus Limestone =

Member of the Foraker Limestone Formation in Kansas

- Stratigraphic range: Gzhelian
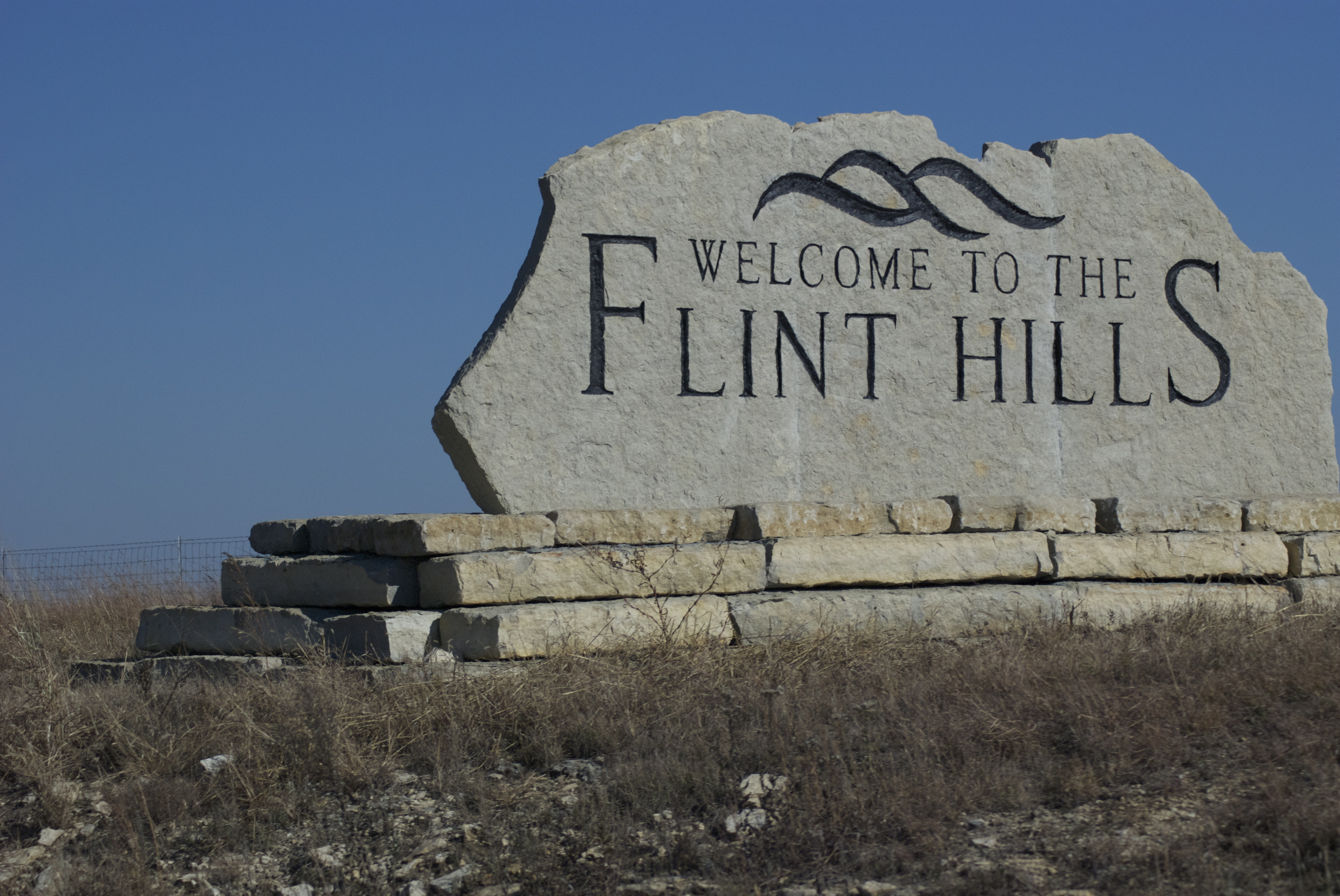
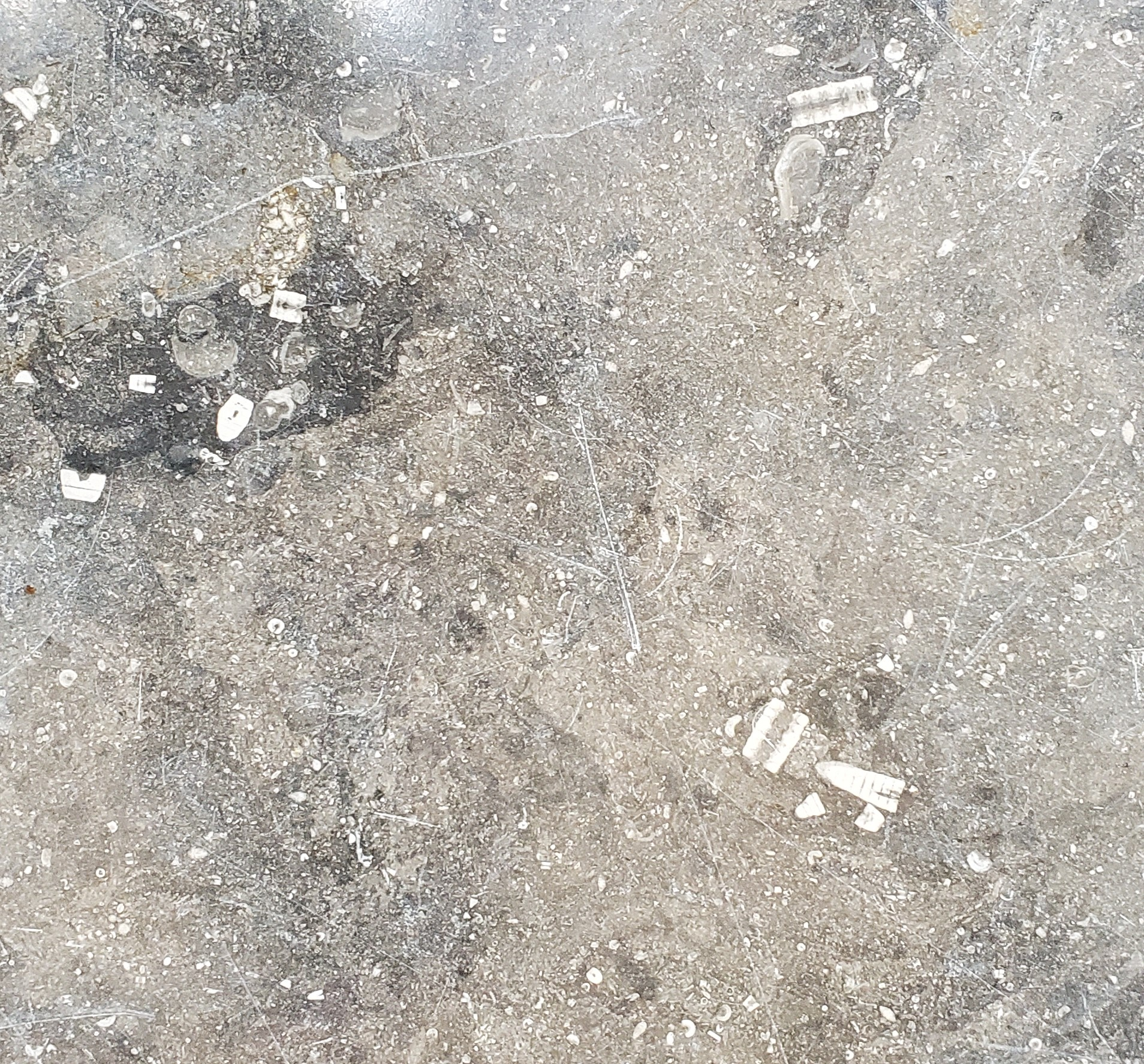
- The Americus Limestone beds form the first bench of the Flint Hills when approaching from the east. Placed near that bench, this sign is carved from the gray-toned Americus Limestone. Americus Limestone sealed and polished as Tuxedo Gray flooring (entrance to the Kansas Historical Society archives) showing typical fusulinids and crinoids.
- Type: Formation member
- Unit of: Foraker Formation of the lower Council Grove Group
- Underlies: Hughes Creek Shale of the Foraker Formation
- Overlies: Hamlin Shale member of the Janesville Shale

Lithology
- Primary: Limestone, shale
- Other: stromatolite limestone, lime-sand mudstone/grainstone, flint

Location
- Region: Kansas
- Country: United States

Type section
- Named for: Americus, Kansas
- Named by: M. Z. Kirk, University Geological Survey of Kansas
- Year defined: 1896

The Americus Limestone is a member of the Foraker Limestone Formation in eastern Kansas, where it is quarried as a distinctive ornamental stone. In outcrop, it is typically recognized as two relatively thin but persistent beds of hard limestone separated by shale that forms the lowest prominent bench of the many benches of the Flint Hills. The recognizable facie of the member in excavated or eroded exposures is two thin limestone beds separated a bed of shale and adjacent shales above and below having a particular gray or bluish color darker than higher limestones. A third, lower, highly variable algal limestone is often present and included as the base of the member. The unit is not particularly massive, the limestone pair totaling 3 to 4 feet (0.91 to 1.22 meters) in places, more in other locations but less to the North, and up to nearly to 9 feet (2.7 meters) at the type location of Americus, Kansas. The addition of the lower algal limestone as a base for the unit increases the thickness to over 18 feet (5.5 meters). Initially thought to be the lowest of the Permian rock of Kansas and as such classified as the lowest unit of the Council Grove Group, the unit is now dated within the uppermost Late Carboniferous.

== Lithologic character ==
In the natural outcrop as well in construction, the highly-fossiliferous blue-gray materials of the Americus unit stand in contrast to adjoining beds that weather into buff shades.

Limestone couplet: The common recognition of the Americus Limestone is a persistent, wide-ranging pair of durable limestone beds separated by shale. These two limestone beds may be referred to as upper and lower Americus Limestone beds. However, this terminology can lend to confusion with a third limestone bed, a "Lower Americus Limestone", that sometimes can be found below this pair, and, where found, is included within the Americus member.

Above this couplet is an additional bed of gray shale with a continuance of typical Americus fossils, but this bed is typically assigned to the overlying, otherwise buff Hughes Creek Shale.

"Lower Americus Limestone": 0 to 12 feet (0.0 to 3.7 metres) below the rather consistent limestone pair is a less consistent third limestone. The variability of this bed is employed to reconstruct the range of environments represented by the outcrop. The base of this limestone, where present, is consistently formed of Collenia stromatolites. The stromatolite base of this limestone can overlie orange lime-sand mudstone to grainstone recording the advancement a shoreline through the area creating the open shallow sea environment where the upper limestones would form. This bed is typically not illustrated on Group and Series scale charts.

Relatively, the paired limestones record broad environmental events across a wide shallow sea while the lowest limestone records a transgressive shoreline.

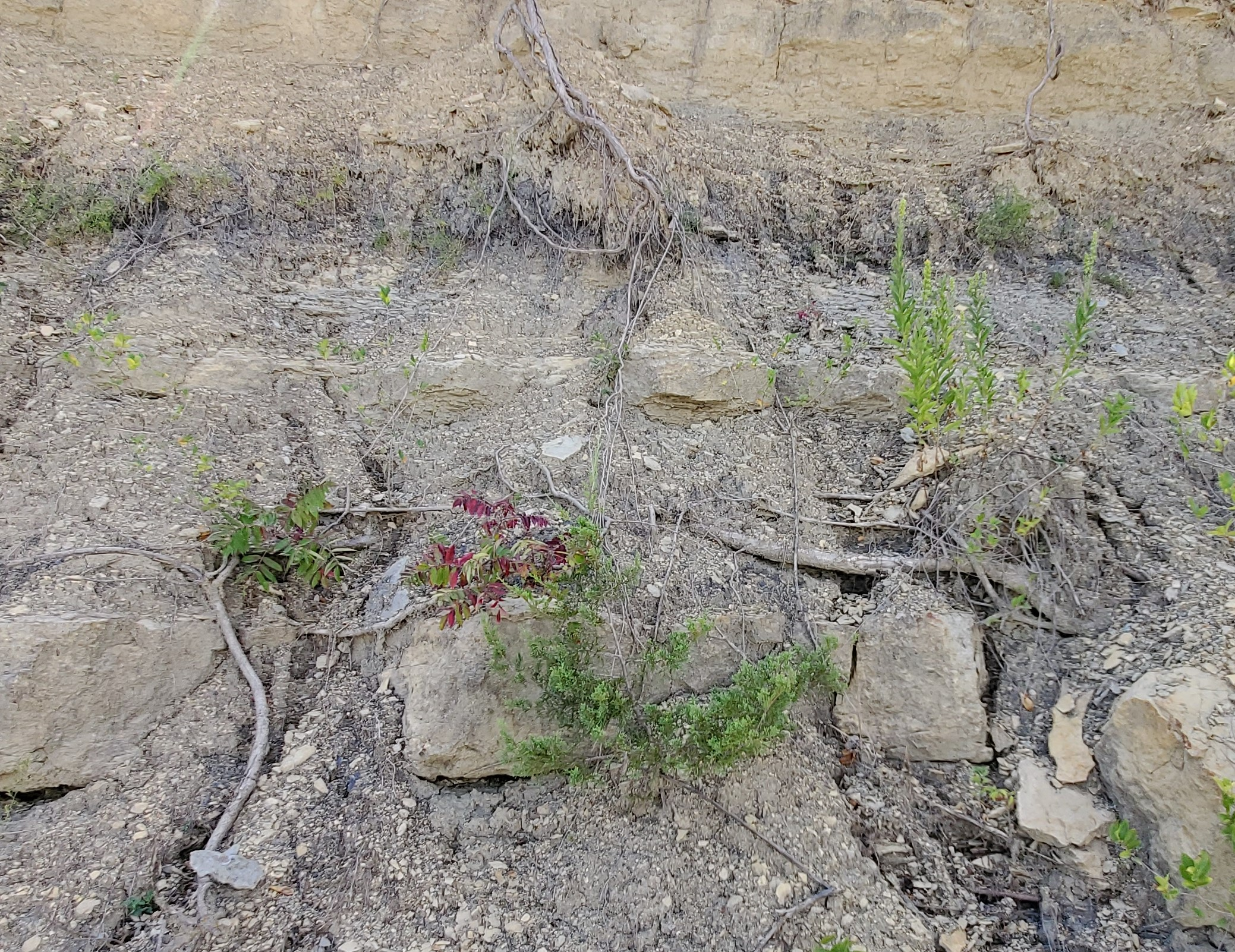
The two thin limestone beds, the limestone "couplet", that marks the top of the Americus Limestone unit.

=== Bedding ===
- Bed #5 Limestone (upper limestone of the couplet): Dark gray to blue-gray shalely-to-hard limestone, few inches to well over a foot thick. Abundant fusulinids and crinoid columnals.
- Bed #4 Shale/Limestone: Tan to gray shale varying from clayey to silty. This shale thins to the north, while south into Oklahoma, it becomes a limestone distinct from the limestone beds above and below.
- Bed #3 Limestone (lower limestone of the couplet): Dark grey to blue-grey shalely-to-hard limestone, few inches to well over a foot thick. Abundant variety of macrofossils; brachiopods, pelecypods, gastropods, horn corals, etc.
- Bed #2 Shale: This shale spans the gap between the lowest limestone bed #1 and the upper pair of limestone beds and (#3 & #5). Earlier authors may have included it within the upper Hamlin Shale Member of the Janesville Shale. The depth of this bed varies from over 9 feet (2.7 meters) weastward, but thins and pinches out eastward as the lower limestone coleses with the other limestones. The depths of this bed are interpreted as indicating variations in bottom elevation of the shallow near-shore environments.
- Bed #1 Limestone (lower Americus limestone): This bed's foundation of tidal stromatolites are interfilled with sorted limey microfossils and covered by skeletal limestone layers of gastropods, pelecypods, and some brachiopods. Eastward towards the presumed paleoshoreline, this bed approaches and coalesces with the base of the lower of the upper paired limestone beds; while westward this bed thins and presumably disappears.

This limestone has been confused for the Houchen Creek limestone bed of the Hamlin Shale Member of the Janesville Shale. Both are limestones found below the upper paired limestones, and both have large masses of tidal Collenia stromatolite; however, the Houchen Creek's stromatolite mounds are more widely spaced and are directly blanketed by shale rather than the skeletal limestone that encases the Americus stromatolites.

== Commercial use ==
The limestone beds are quarried for construction material. The tougher uppermost limestone bed in particular is sold commercially as Tuxedo Gray or "Flint Hills Gray", and is popular in eastern Kansas for its abundant visible fossils, gray tone that contrasts with the buff tone of Cottonwood Limestone, and the ability of the stone to take a polish that accentuates both the fossils and darker gray color.

Examples of construction use

- Kansas State Archives, flooring, stairs, and table
- Kansas State Capitol, lobby
- Kansas State University Student Union, courtyard lighting plinths, walls, and fountain
- Robert J. Dole Institute of Politics, exterior lower courses
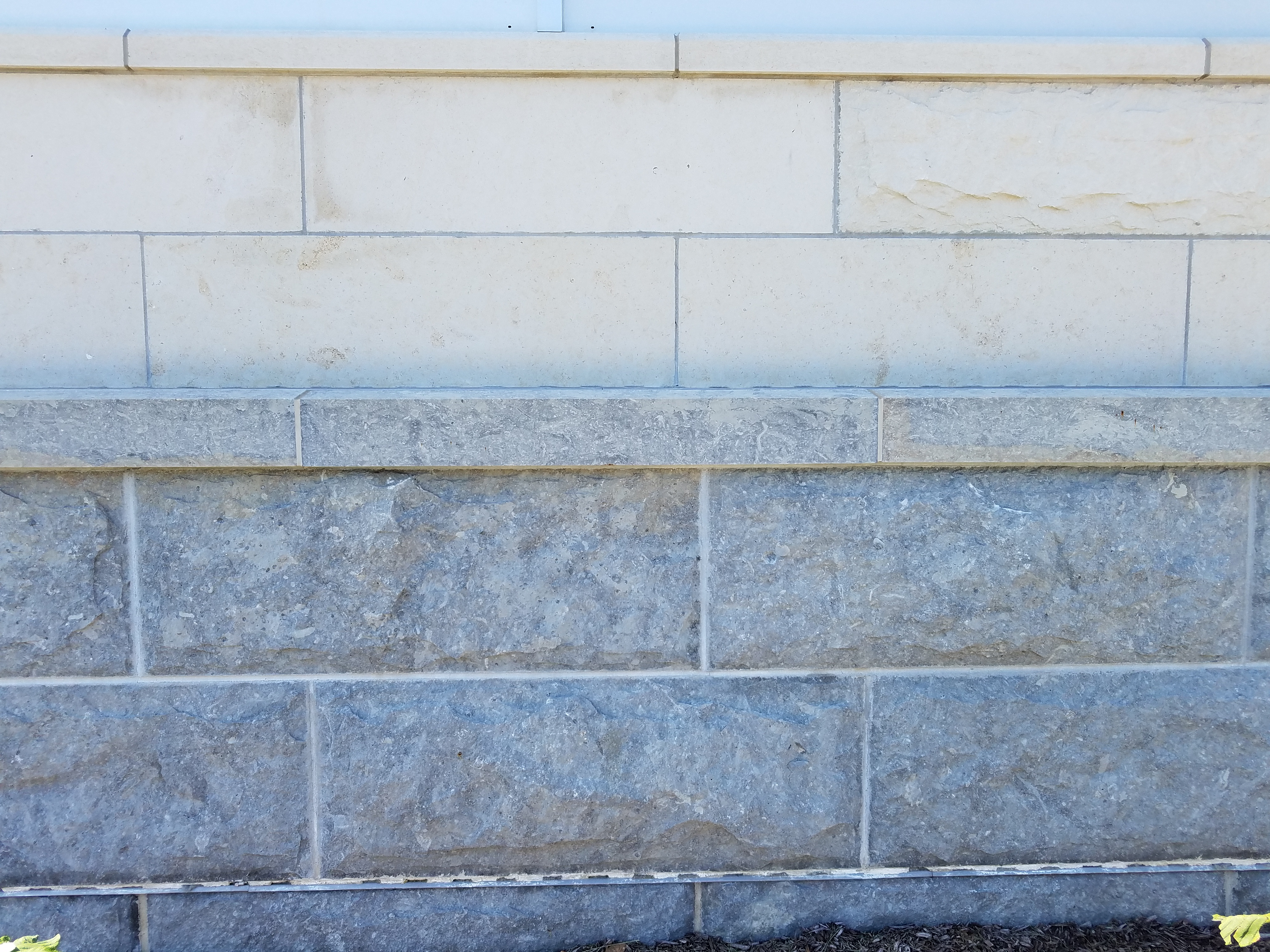
Americus Limestone: Grey contrasting with the buff Cottonwood Limestone.

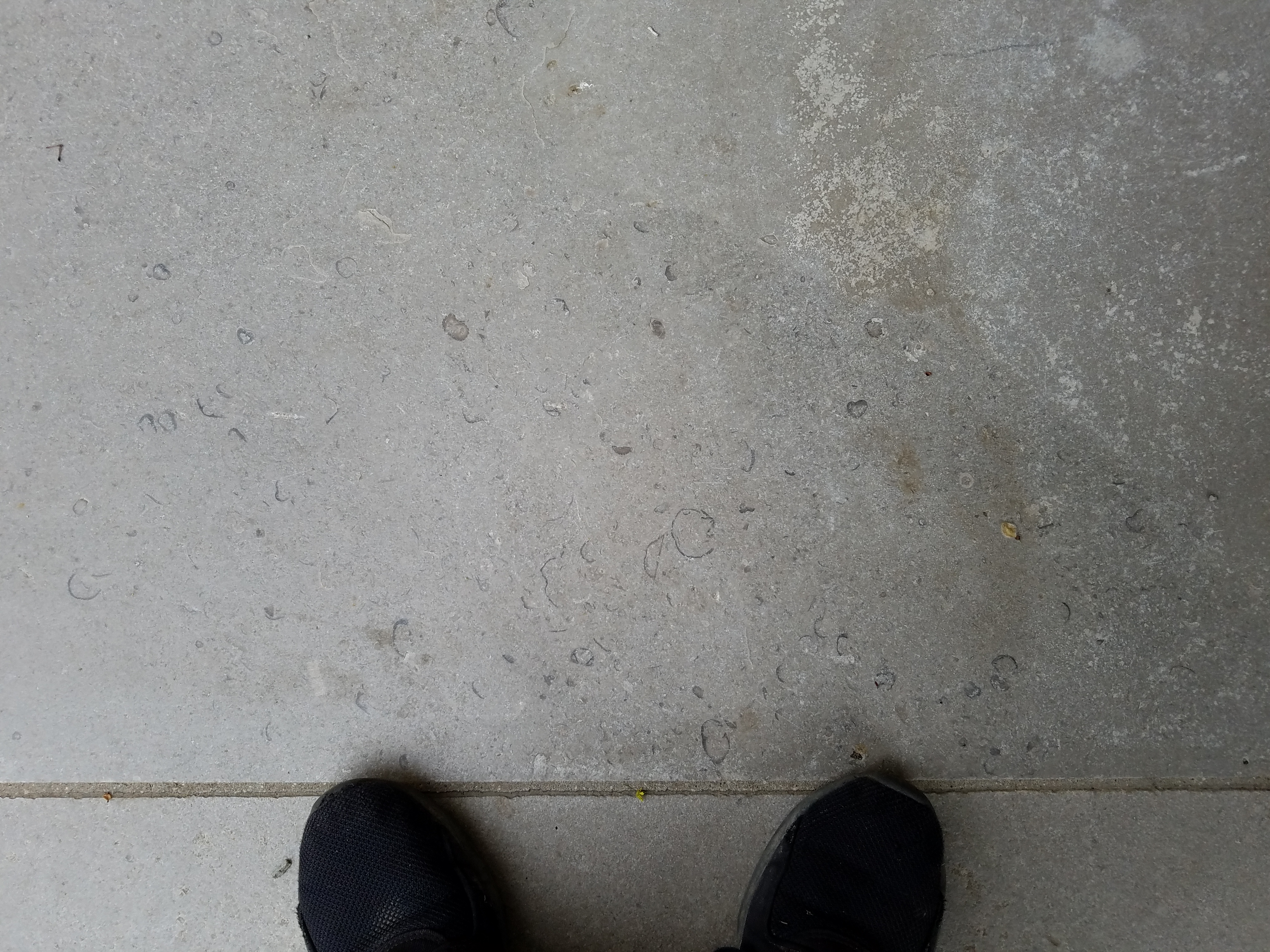
Americus Limestone: 100 year old Thompson Hall threshold, KSU.

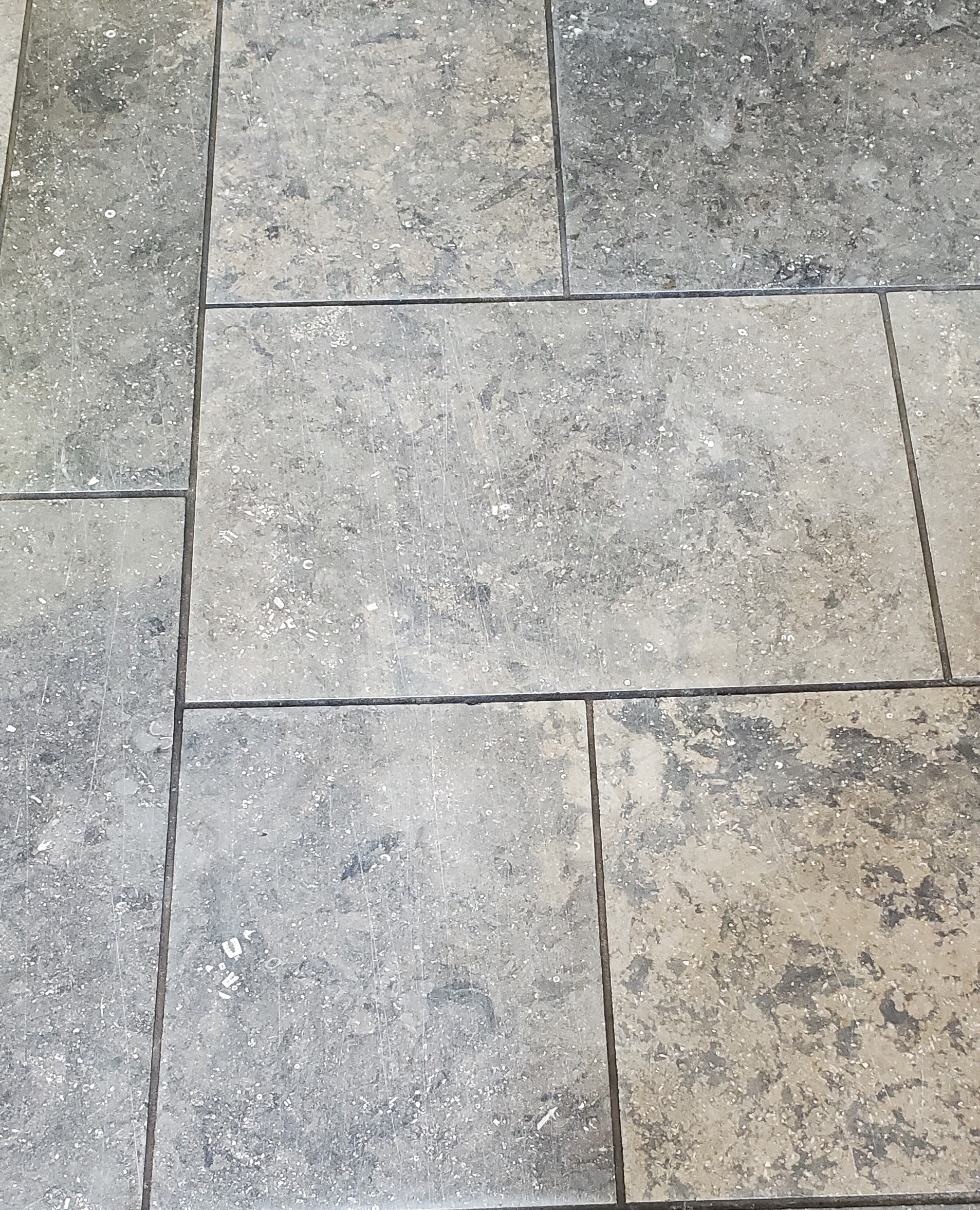
Tuxedo Grey: Kansas Historical Society archives entrance flooring

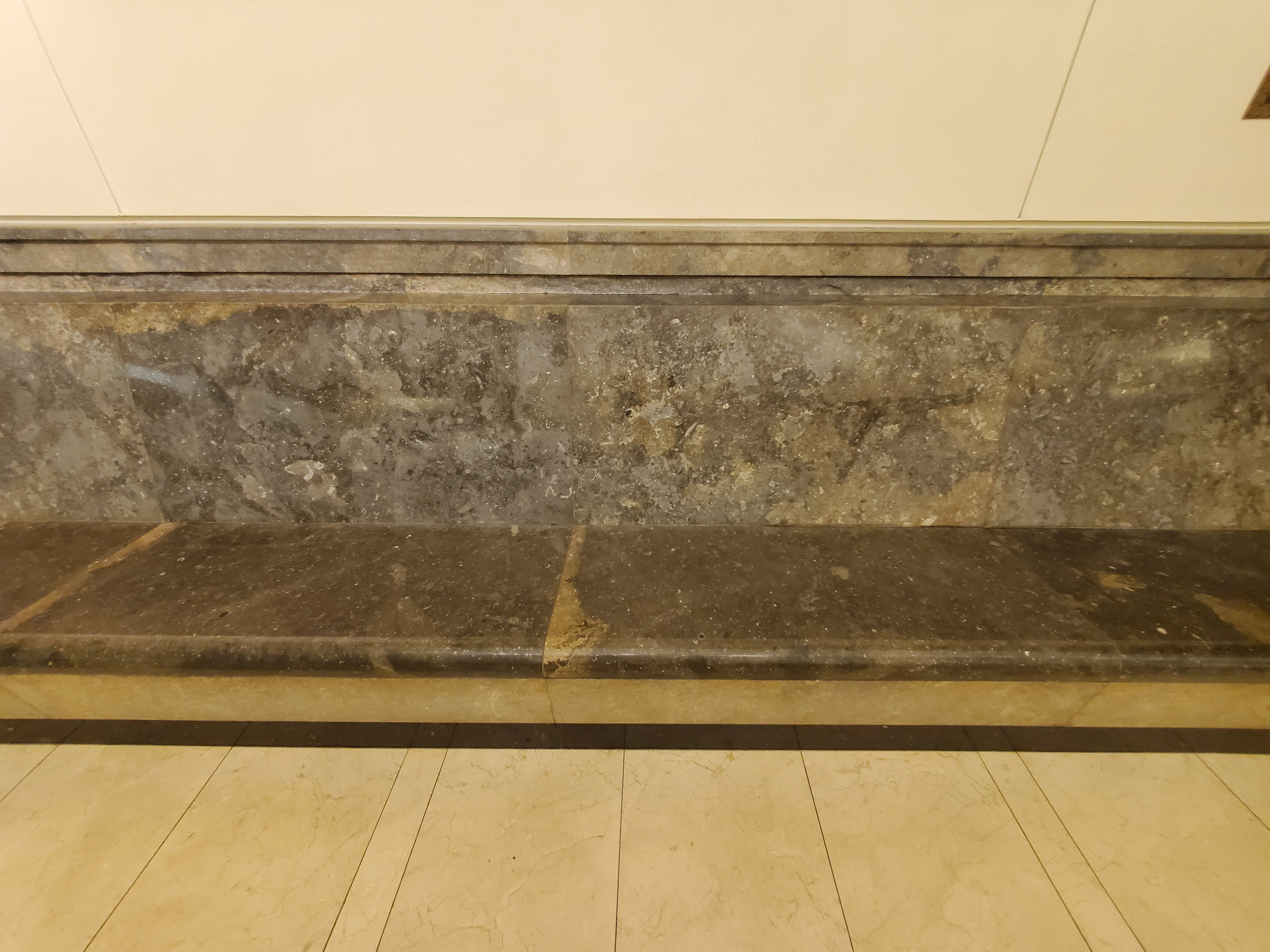
Tuxedo Grey: Kansas State Capitol - visitor entrance bench

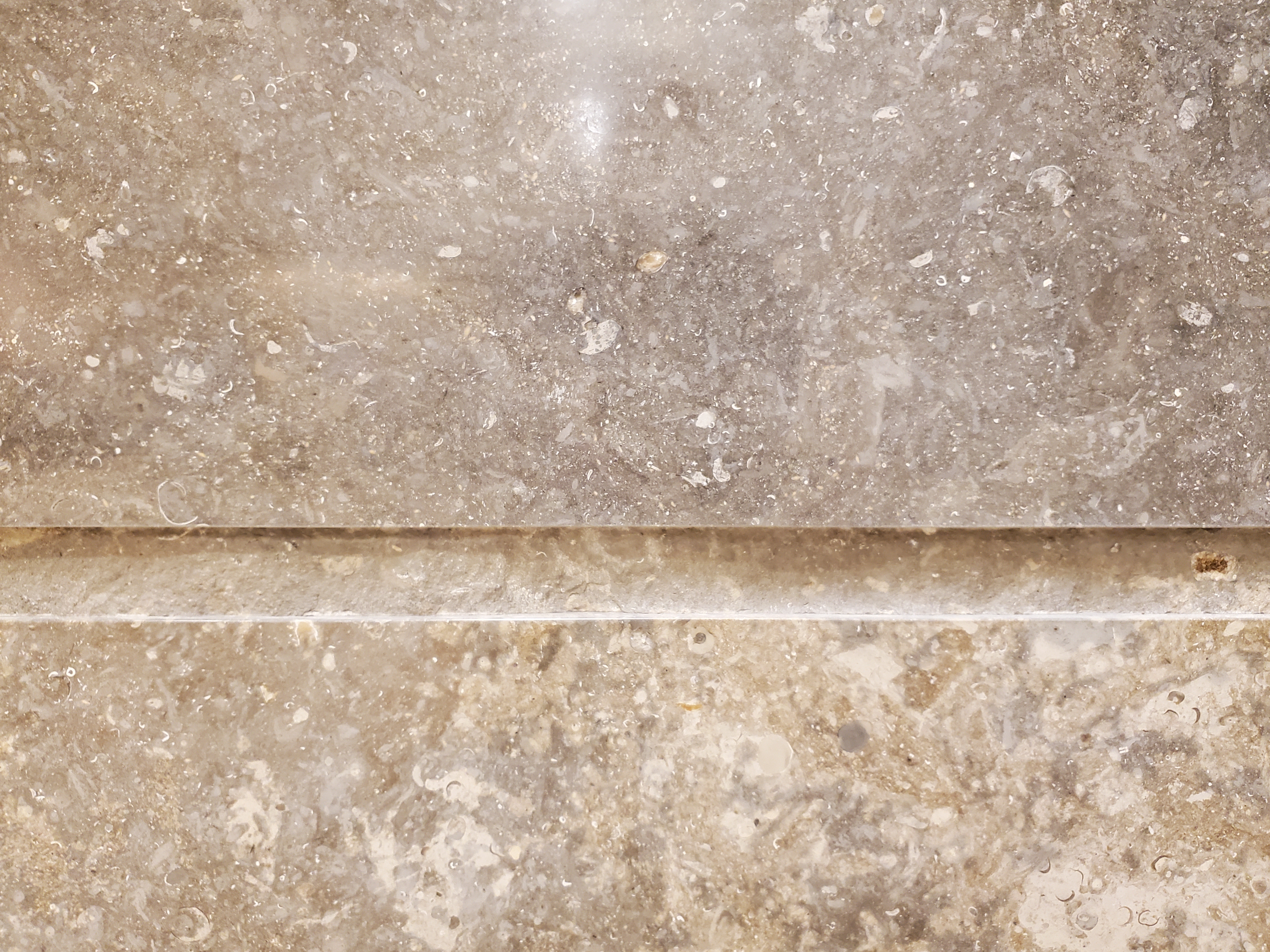
Tuxedo Grey: Kansas State Capitol - visitor entrance wainscot

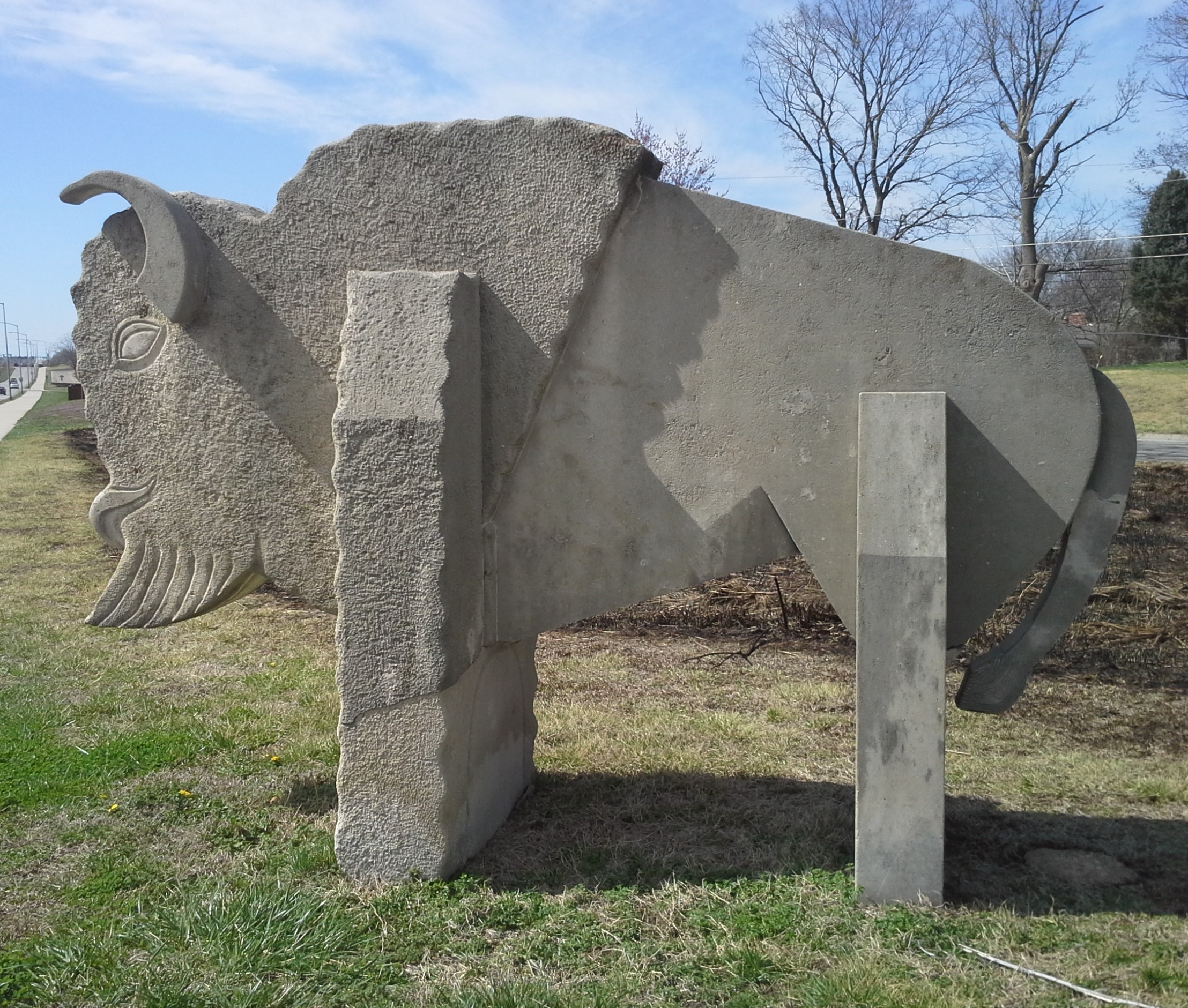
Americus Limestone: 1988 Jim Patti Buffalo sculpture, Lawrence, Kansas.

== Fossils ==
As much of the Americus environment was shallow seawater with tidal currents, the formation is known for abundant, fragmented, and sorted remains of fusilinids, crinoids, brachiopods, and stromatolites.

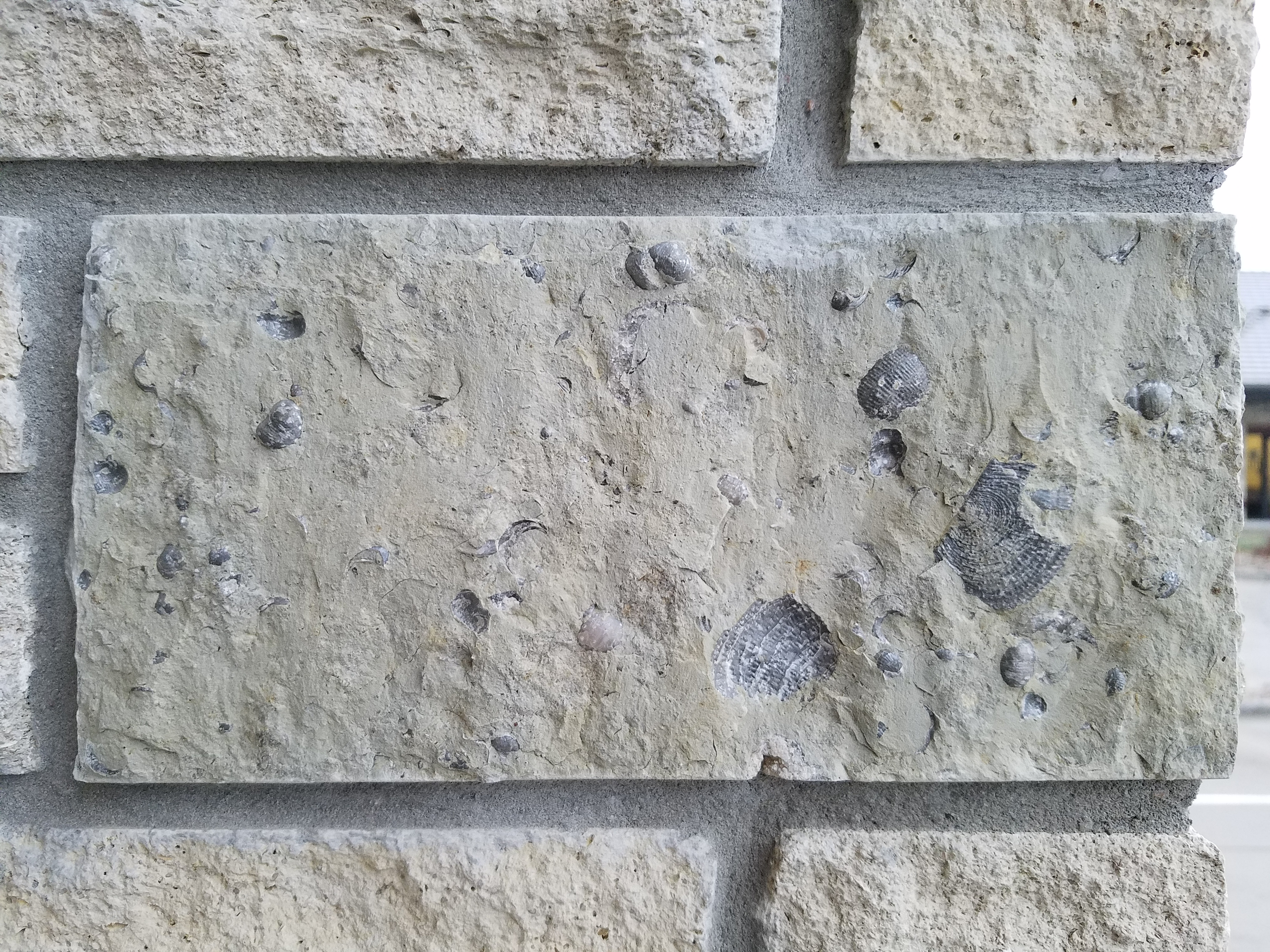
Americus Ls split on the bedding, "shiner-laid" to show Hystriculina, Productida, and Derbyia.

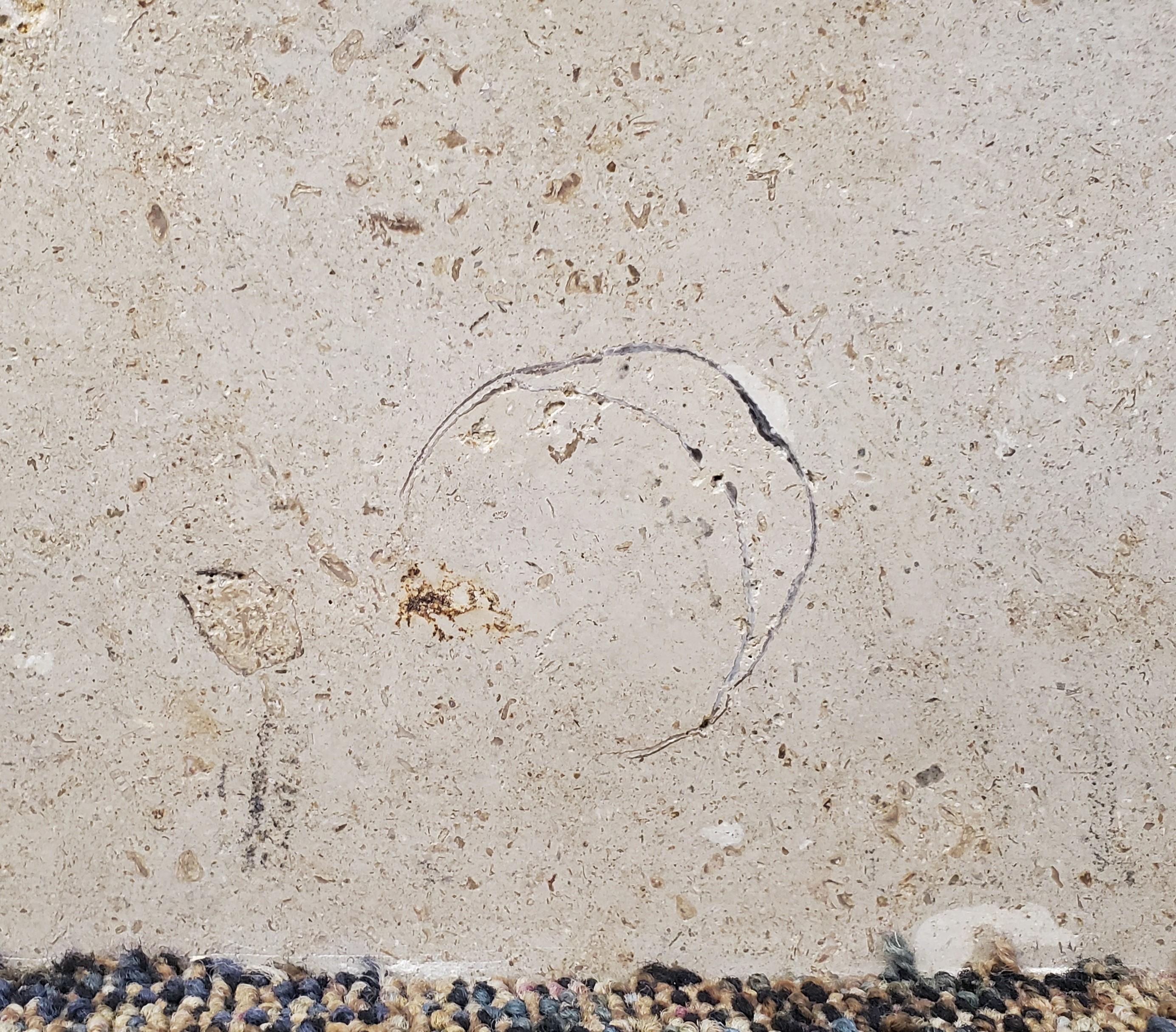
Fine cross section of a Linoproductus.

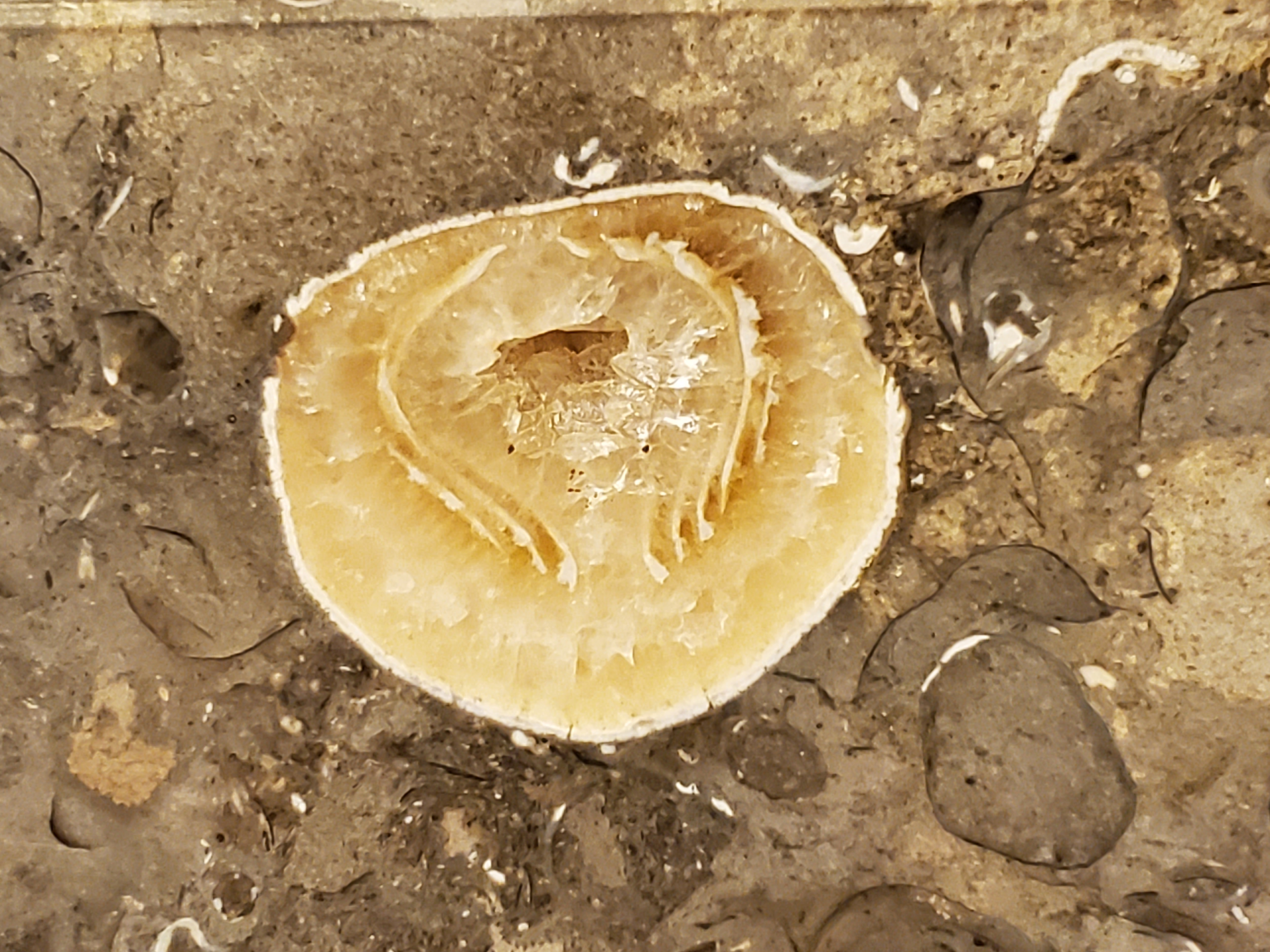
Tuxedo Grey: Interior lophophore structures of a Linoproductus preserved in calcite.

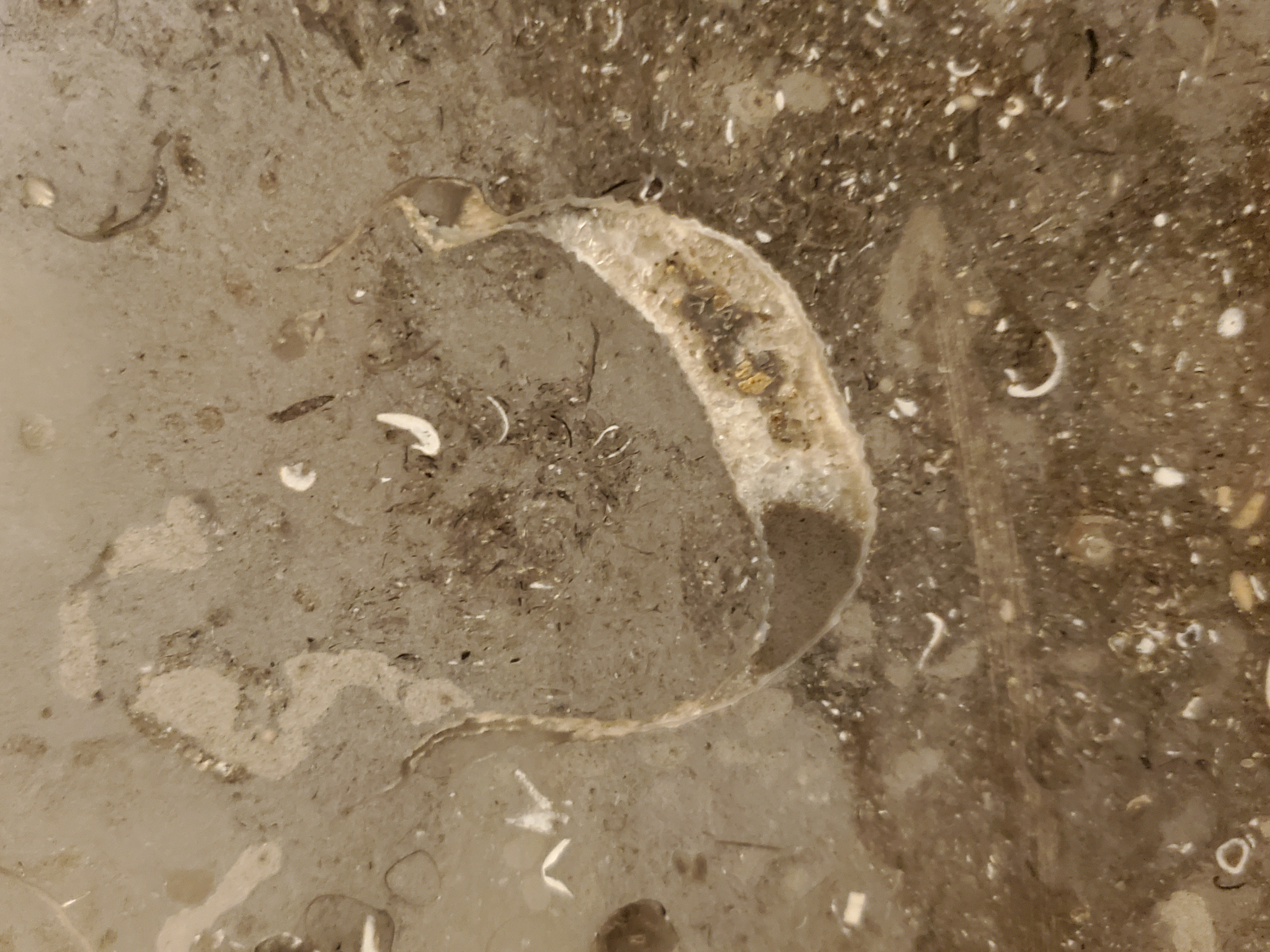
Tuxedo Grey: Calcite-filled Linoproductus mantle.

== See also ==
- List of fossiliferous stratigraphic units in Kansas
- Paleontology in Kansas
