= Pleasanton Group =

Geologic formation

- Stratigraphic range: Carboniferous
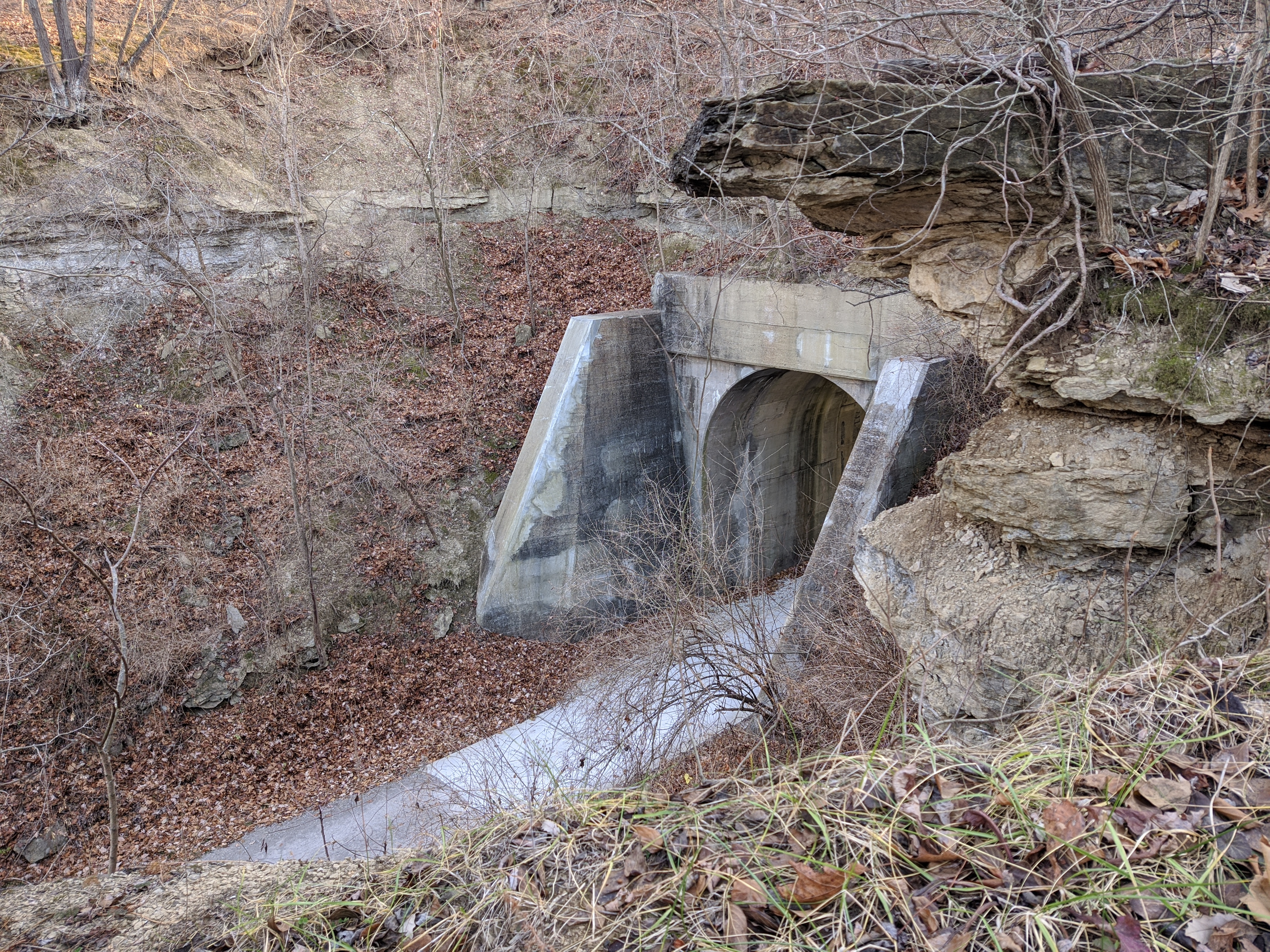
- An outcrop of Knobtown sandstone, part of the Tacket Formation, the uppermost layer of the Pleasanton Group, at the Vale Tunnel, Kansas City, Missouri. This portion of the cyclothem is a tidal or non-marine environment, where swampy areas can lead to coal formation and river or stream deltas can lead to pockets of sandstone, which can be oil-producing.
- Type: Group
- Unit of: Missourian Series (Kasimovian), Pennsylvanian Period, Carboniferous Era
- Underlies: Kansas City Group
- Overlies: Marmaton Formation, Desmoinesian age (unconformity)

Location
- Region: Missouri, Kansas, Oklahoma
- Country: United States

The Pleasanton Group is a geologic group in Kansas and Missouri. It preserves fossils dating back to the Carboniferous period.

== Characteristics ==
The Pleasanton Group is the lowest and earliest of three groups in the Missourian series, which dates to approximately 307 to 303.7 Ma. This equates to the Kasimovian Stage of the ICS geologic timescale.

The Missourian Series is the third of four stages the Pennsylvanian period and is considered Late Pennsylvanian. The Pennsylvanian, also known as the Late Carboniferous, covers the years ca. 323.4 million years ago to ca. 298.9 million years ago.

The Pleasanton Group, a span of rocks that is mostly shale but includes some sandstone, limestone, and coal . . . These rocks, which for several years previous to 1948 were called the "Bourbon Group," are of early Missourian age (Upper Pennsylvanian).

The Group comprises, in ascending order, the Seminole Formation, the Checkerboard Limestone, and the Tacket Formation . . .

Pleasanton strata lie on a surface of disconformity which truncates upper Marmaton formations of Desmoinesian age. The contact between Pleasanton rocks and lower sediments is quite easily identifiable because of the presence of the Hepler Sandstone Member of the Seminole Formation, which can be seen almost everywhere along the exposed contact. This contact is regarded as the boundary between Desmoinesian and overlying Missourian sediments

== Upper Pennsylvanian Cyclothems ==
Most strata in the Upper Pennsylvanian, including the Pleasanton Group, are cyclothems: Alternating stratigraphic sequences of marine and non-marine sediments. These different environments were created as sea levels rose and fell throughout this period, driven by changes in climate, growth and melting of ice sheets, and other variables. These areas were close to the ancient seashore, so as sea levels rose and fell, they transitioned from coastal land to seashore to shallow water to deep water, and then back.

The result was an alternating series of shales and limestones - shale produced both during coastal and deep water periods, and limestone during shallow water periods.

Sandstone and siltstone, typically in lenticular formations, is often produced in a river or stream delta area along the seashore. Pockets of coal where typically produced in marshy areas along the shoreline.

The exact details of each cyclothem in a given location depend on its relation to the sea level - those at lower depth may never, or only briefly, experience nonmarine environments while those at higher elevations may experience more periods of time on dry land, coastal, and very shallow water depths.

== Elements of the Pleasanton Group ==
The Kansas Geological Survey identifies these elements of the Pleasanton Group, including the thickness of each member in feet:

Pleasanton Group
Tacket Formation	
Upper shale unit	
Shale, black, fissile, carbonaceous, contains phosphatic nodules near base	19.0
Limestone unit	
Limestone, nodular, gray, weathering light gray, very fine-grained, conchoidal fracture, silty	0.5
Lower shale unit	
Shale, black, fissile, iron-stained at top, much of interval covered	20.5
Total	40.0
Checkerboard Limestone	
Upper limestone unit	
Limestone, brown, weathering light brown, nodular, fine-grained, slightly silty, contains gastropods, Derbyia, Composita, and other brachiopod fragments, few arenaceous foraminifers	0.8
Shale, blocky, yellow, calcareous	0.2
Limestone, nodular, thick-bedded, fine-grained, brown, weathering light brown	0.6
	1.6
Shale unit	
Shale, gray, blocky, mostly covered	8.0
Lower limestone unit	
Limestone, reddish-gray, weathering light-brown, thin-bedded, contains Derbyia crassa, Composita, Aviculopectin, gastropods and bryozoan fragments, and arenaceous foraminifers	0.8
Total	10.4
Seminole Formation	
South Mound Shale Member	
Shale, gray, platy to blocky	3.0
Covered	7.0
	10.0
Hepler Sandstone Member	
Sandstone, reddish-brown, weathering gray, medium-bedded, limonite cement, well sorted, mainly quartz, very minor amounts of muscovite and garnet, average grain size 1/16 mm in diameter, frosted, sub-rounded to subangular, sphericity of 0.5	1.0
Total	11.0

== See also ==
- List of fossiliferous stratigraphic units in Kansas
- Paleontology in Kansas
