= Emporia Formation =

Geologic formation in Kansas, United States

Emporia Formation Emporia Limestone
- Stratigraphic range: Gzhelian (Virgilian stage)
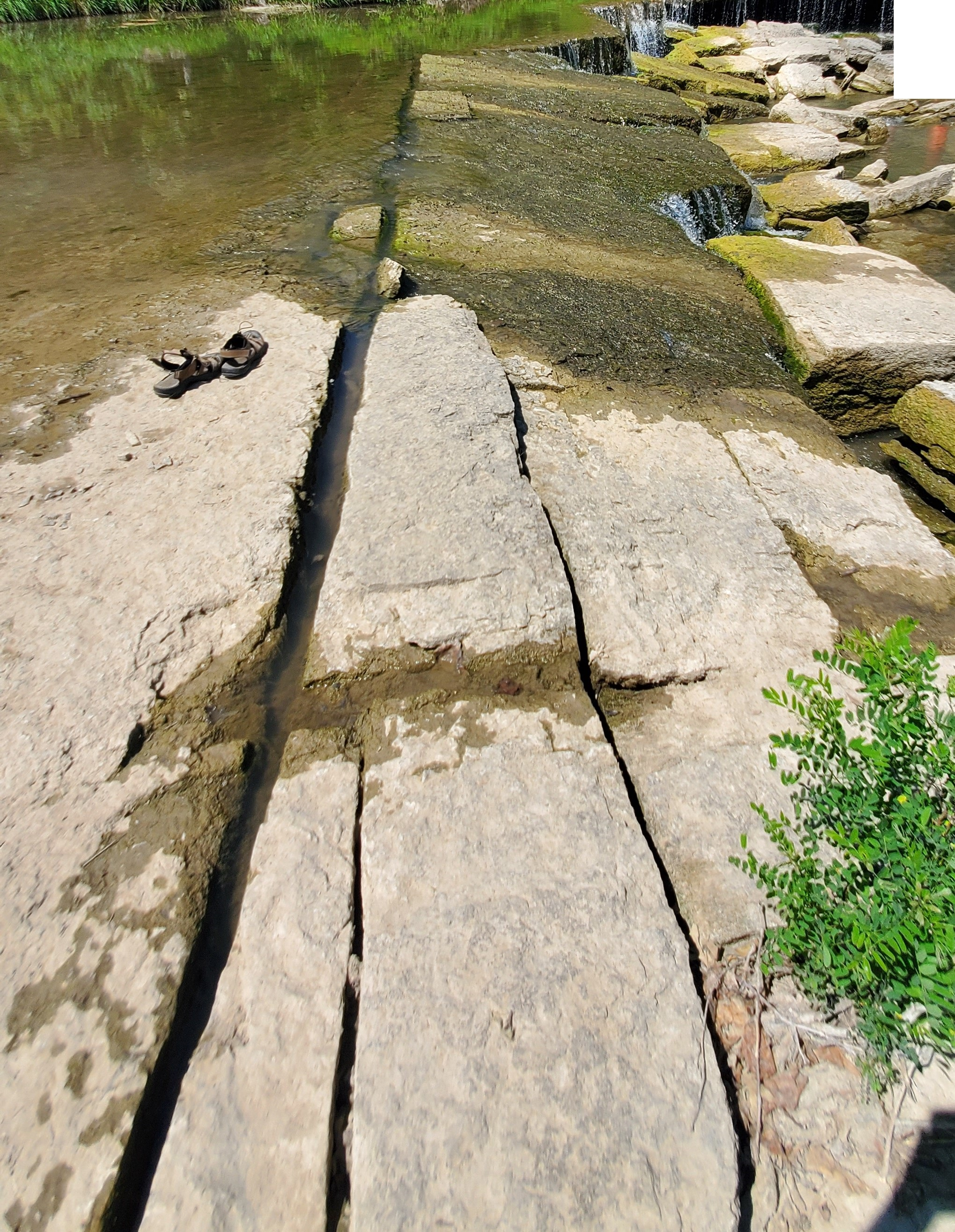
- Parallel jointing in the hard Elmont Limestone at Pillsbury Crossing
- Type: Formation
- Unit of: Wabaunsee Group; Oklahoma: Vamoosa Group
- Sub-units: Elmont Limestone; Harvyville Shale; Reading Limestone
- Underlies: Willard Shale
- Overlies: Auburn Shale

Lithology
- Primary: Limestone, shale
- Other: Sandstone

Location
- Region: Kansas
- Country: United States

Type section
- Named for: Emporia, Kansas
- Named by: R.C. Moore and M.R. Mudge
- Year defined: 1956

The Emporia Formation, also referred to as Emporia Limestone, is a Late-Carboniferous geologic formation in Kansas, extending into Nebraska, Iowa, Missouri, and Oklahoma.

This formation's members are, top to bottom,

- Elmont Limestone, named for Elmont, Kansas (Beede, 1898)
- Harveyville Shale, named for Harveyville, Kansas (Moore, 1936)
- Reading Limestone, named for Reading, Kansas (Moore, 1936)

While the Elmont Limestone member is generally less than 3 feet thick (1 meter), it can be as thick as 15 feet (5 meters) and as thin as 12 inches. As thin as that, it is particularly resistant and forms multiple waterfalls within a few miles along Deep Creek in southern Riley County, including Pillsbury Crossing. At Pillsbury Crossing, the Elmont Limestone is seen with parallel joints (pictured); and where not thickly covered with algae, the surface shows curious parallelogram patterns.

== See also ==
- List of fossiliferous stratigraphic units in Kansas
- Paleontology in Kansas
