= Willard Shale =

Geologic formation in Kansas, United States

Willard Formation Willard Shale
- Stratigraphic range: Gzhelian (Virgilian stage)
- Type: Formation
- Unit of: Wabaunsee Group
- Underlies: Zeandale Limestone
- Overlies: Emporia Limestone

Lithology
- Primary: Argillaceous shale
- Other: Thin arenaceous shales, sand

Location
- Region: Kansas
- Country: United States

Type section
- Named for: Willard, Kansas
- Named by: Beede
- Year defined: 1898

The Willard Formation, also referred to as Willard Shale, is a Late-Carboniferous geologic formation in Kansas, extending into Nebraska, Iowa, Missouri, and Oklahoma.

The full face of the formation is exposed for easy access on the north bank of Deep Creek at the public park, Pillsbury Crossing, in southeast Riley County, Kansas, about 25 miles (40 km) west of the type location at Willard, Kansas.

== See also ==
- List of fossiliferous stratigraphic units in Kansas
- Paleontology in Kansas
