= Funston Limestone =

Geologic formation

- Stratigraphic range: Permian
- Type: Formation
- Unit of: Council Grove Group
- Underlies: Speiser Shale
- Overlies: Blue Rapids Shale
- Thickness: 7 to 9 feet (almost 3 meters)

Lithology
- Primary: Limestone
- Other: Shale

Location
- Coordinates: 39°05′46″N 96°43′35″W
- Region: Kansas
- Country: United States

Type section
- Named for: Camp Funston at Fort Riley
- Named by: Condra, G.E., and Upp, J.E.
- Year defined: 1931

The Funston Limestone is a Permian geologic formation in Kansas having various significant beds of limestone with some shale. This formation was named for Camp Funston, Riley County, Kansas, in 1931 by Condra, G.E., and Upp, J.E.. Adjoining the old camp, some of the oldest buildings in Ogden, Kansas, are built with near-white Funston Limestone.

== See also ==
- List of fossiliferous stratigraphic units in Kansas
- Paleontology in Kansas
