= Johnson Formation =

Geologic formation in the United States

- Stratigraphic range: Carboniferous
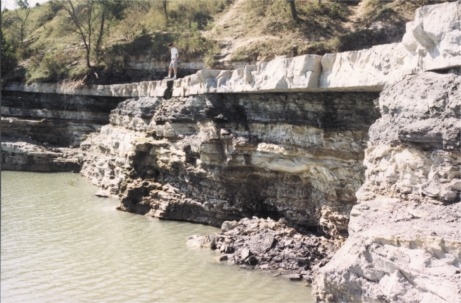
- Head cut of Johnson Shale in the Tuttle Creek Lake spillway freshly exposed by the 1993 flood, showing unweathered coloration. (capped by the bright Glenrock limestone member of the Red Eagle Formation)
- Type: Formation
- Underlies: Red Eagle Formation
- Overlies: Foraker Formation

Lithology
- Primary: Shale
- Other: resistant beds of argillaceous mudstone to well-laminated limestones

Location
- Region: Midcontinent (Nebraska, Kansas, Oklahoma)
- Country: United States

Type section
- Named for: Johnson, Oklahoma

The Johnson Formation (or Johnson Limestone) is a thick geologic formation of soft shale with thin, resistant beds of chalkier mudstone and limestone in Nebraska, Kansas, and Oklahoma rarely exposed outside of road cuts. It preserves fossils dating back to the late-Carboniferous period.

== See also ==
- List of fossiliferous stratigraphic units in Kansas
- List of fossiliferous stratigraphic units in Nebraska
- List of fossiliferous stratigraphic units in Oklahoma
- Paleontology in Kansas
- Paleontology in Nebraska
- Paleontology in Oklahoma
