= Roca Formation (United States) =

Geologic formation in Oklahoma, Nebraska, and Kansas

- Stratigraphic range: early Permian
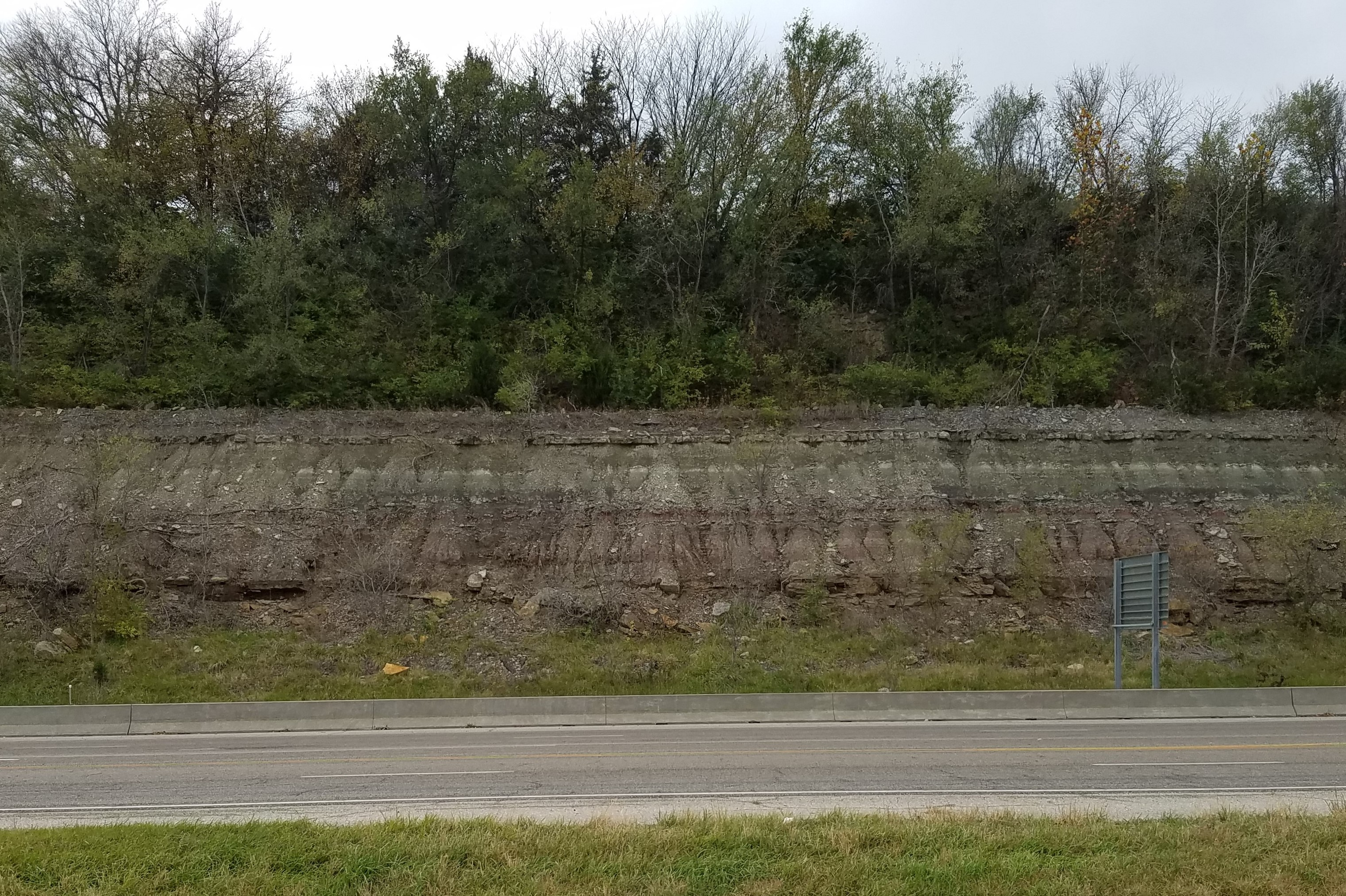
- Multicolored Roca Shale, well-exposed along Seth Child Road in Manhattan, Kansas, marked by the Howe limestone below and the Sallyards limestone and Legion shale above.
- Type: Formation

Lithology
- Primary: Shale and mudstone
- Other: Limestone

Location
- Region: Midcontinent (Nebraska, Kansas, Oklahoma)
- Country: United States

Type section
- Named for: Roca, Nebraska

The Roca Formation (or Roca Shale) is an early Permian geologic formation (Wolfcampian) with its exposure running north and south through Kansas and extending into Nebraska and Oklahoma, notably comprising varicolored black, brown, gray, green, red, and blue shales, mudstones, and limestone, some of which representing Permian paleosols.

== See also ==
- List of fossiliferous stratigraphic units in Kansas
- List of fossiliferous stratigraphic units in Nebraska
- List of fossiliferous stratigraphic units in Oklahoma
- Paleontology in Kansas
- Paleontology in Nebraska
- Paleontology in Oklahoma
