= Comanche Group =

- Stratigraphic range: Cretaceous
- Type: Group

Location
- Region: Kansas
- Country: United States

The Comanche Group is a geologic group in Kansas. It preserves fossils dating back to the Cretaceous period.

== See also ==
- List of fossiliferous stratigraphic units in Kansas
- Paleontology in Kansas
