= Oread Limestone =

Geologic formation in the United States

- Stratigraphic range: Kasimovian–Gzhelian (Virgilian stage)
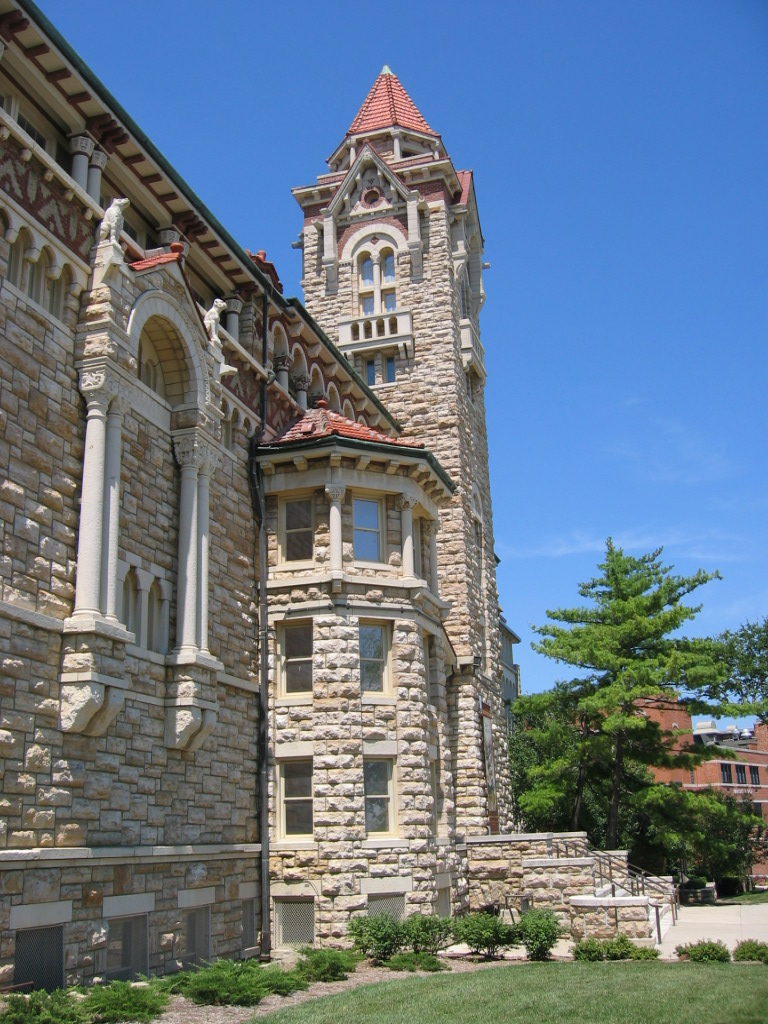
- Natural History Museum, Dyche Hall, University of Kansas, built with Oread Limestone
- Type: Formation

Location
- Region: Kansas, Nebraska, Missouri, Oklahoma, Iowa
- Country: United States

The Oread Limestone is a geologic unit of formation rank within the Shawnee Group throughout much of its extent. It is exposed in Kansas, Nebraska, Missouri, Oklahoma, and Iowa. The type locality is Mount Oread within Lawrence, Kansas. It preserves fossils of the Carboniferous period. Although it has significant shale members, its limestone members are resistant and form escarpments and ridges. Limestone from the unit is a historic building material in Kansas, particularly in the early buildings of the University of Kansas; standing examples include Spooner Hall and Dyche Hall.

== See also ==
- List of fossiliferous stratigraphic units in Iowa
- List of fossiliferous stratigraphic units in Kansas
- List of fossiliferous stratigraphic units in Nebraska
- Paleontology in Iowa
- Paleontology in Kansas
- Paleontology in Nebraska
