= Havensville Formation =

Geologic formation in Kansas, United States

- Stratigraphic range: Permian
- Type: Formation

Location
- Region: Kansas
- Country: United States

The Havensville Formation is a geologic formation in Kansas. It preserves fossils dating back to the Permian period.

== See also ==
- List of fossiliferous stratigraphic units in Kansas
- Paleontology in Kansas
