= Janesville Shale =

Geologic formation in Kansas, Oklahoma, and Nebraska

- Stratigraphic range: Late Carboniferous (Virgilian)
- Type: Formation
- Unit of: Admire Group
- Sub-units: Five Point Limestone, Hamlin Shale, West Branch Shale

Lithology
- Primary: Shale
- Other: Limestone

Location
- Region: Kansas, Oklahoma, Nebraska
- Country: United States

Type section
- Named for: Janesville Township of Greenwood County, Kansas

The Janesville Shale or Janesville Formation is a geologic formation in Kansas, Oklahoma, and Nebraska dating to the late Carboniferous period.

== See also ==
- List of fossiliferous stratigraphic units in Kansas
- List of fossiliferous stratigraphic units in Oklahoma
- List of fossiliferous stratigraphic units in Nebraska
- Paleontology in Kansas
- Paleontology in Oklahoma
- Paleontology in Nebraska
