= Howard Formation =

Geologic formation in Kansas, United States

- Stratigraphic range: Carboniferous
- Type: Formation
- Unit of: Wabaunsee Group
- Sub-units: Church Member

Location
- Region: Kansas
- Country: United States

The Howard Formation is a geologic formation in Kansas. It preserves fossils dating back to the Carboniferous period.

== See also ==
- List of fossiliferous stratigraphic units in Kansas
- Paleontology in Kansas
