= Neva Limestone =

Stratigraphic unit in the United States

- Stratigraphic range: Lower Permian
- Type: Formation Member
- Unit of: Grenola Limestone
- Sub-units: Soft Neva, Hard Neva
- Underlies: Eskridge Shale
- Overlies: Salem Point Shale member of the Grenola Limestone formation

Lithology
- Primary: Limestone

Location
- Region: mid-continental
- Country: United States

Type section
- Named for: Neva, Kansas

The Neva Limestone is a stratigraphic unit and historic building stone in east-central Kansas, northeast-central Oklahoma, and southeastern Nebraska in the Midwestern United States. It preserves fossils dating to the Permian period.

== See also ==
- List of fossiliferous stratigraphic units in Kansas
- List of fossiliferous stratigraphic units in Nebraska
- List of fossiliferous stratigraphic units in Oklahoma
- Paleontology in Kansas
- Paleontology in Nebraska
- Paleontology in Oklahoma
