= Eskridge Shale =

- Stratigraphic range: Early Permian
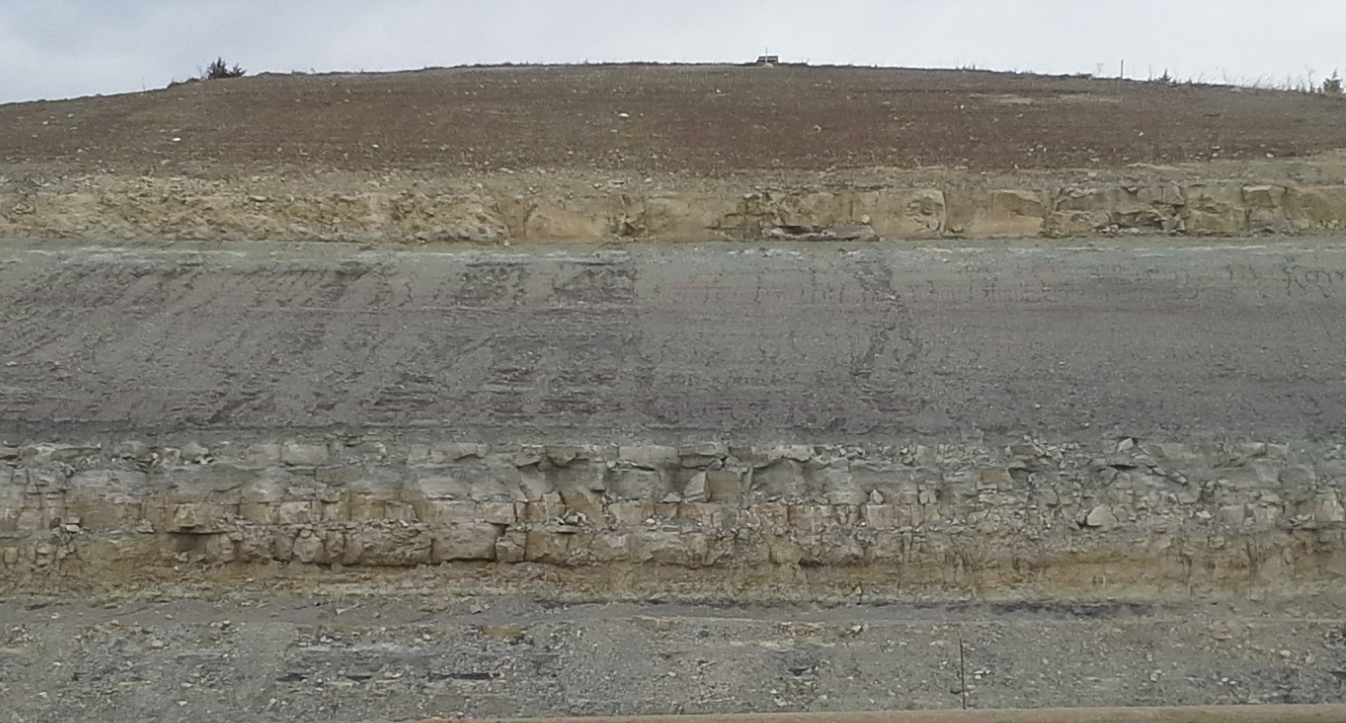
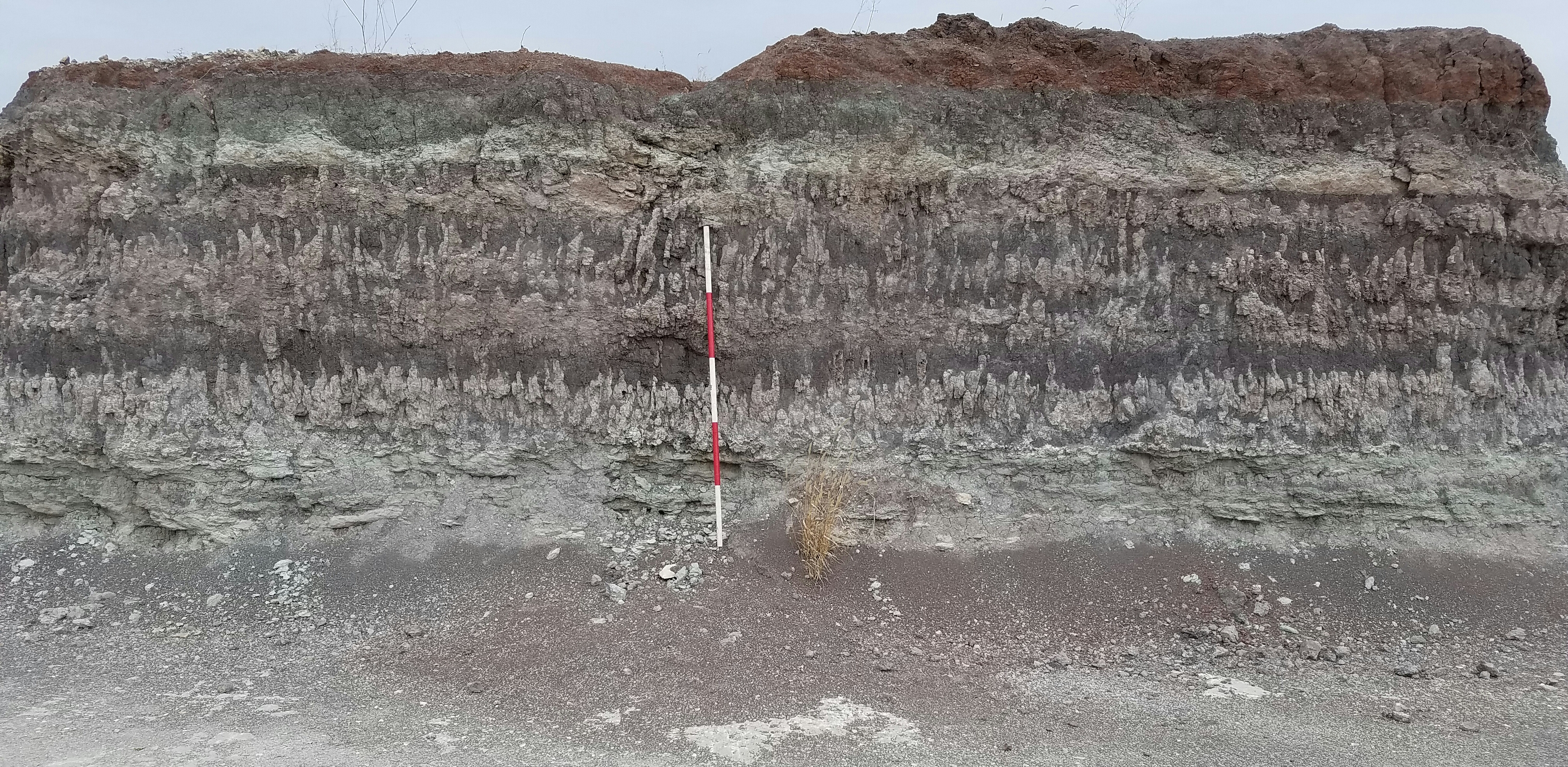
- Fresh excavation of Eskridge Shale (green and red mudstone band and gray marine shale) above the Neva Limestone and below the Cottonwood Limestone, Stag Hill roadcut of K-18 southwest of Manhattan, Kansas, 2013. Rain-washed vertical paleosol concretions (roots or burrows), lowest 10 feet (3 meters) of the formation, 2016 excavation at Anderson and Scenic Drive, Manhattan, Kansas.
- Type: Formation
- Unit of: Council Grove Group

Lithology
- Primary: mudstone paleosol
- Other: marine shale

Location
- Region: Kansas, Oklahoma, Nebraska
- Country: United States

Type section
- Named for: Eskridge, Kansas

The Eskridge Shale or Eskridge Formation is an Early Permian geologic formation in Kansas. Its outcrop runs north–south through Kansas, extending into Oklahoma and Nebraska. While named a shale, it features extensive, spectacular red and green stacked paleosol mudstones, these mudstones showing prominent vertical tubular carbonate concretions, possibly from roots or vertebrate burrows.

== See also ==
- List of fossiliferous stratigraphic units in Kansas
- Paleontology in Kansas
