= Rexroad Formation =

Geologic formation in Kansas, United States

- Stratigraphic range: Neogene
- Type: Formation

Location
- Region: Kansas
- Country: United States

The Rexroad Formation is a geologic formation in Kansas. It preserves fossils dating back to the Neogene period. These fossils include two types of skunk (Spilogale rexroadi and Brachyprotoma breviramus), a tree bat (Lasiurus fossilis), a ringtail (Bassariscus casei), several snakes, such as Elaphe obsoleta, and a turkey (Agriocharis progenes).

== See also ==
- List of fossiliferous stratigraphic units in Kansas
- Paleontology in Kansas
