= Speiser Shale =

- Stratigraphic range: Permian
- Type: Formation
- Unit of: Council Grove Group

Lithology
- Primary: Shale
- Other: Mudstone

Location
- Region: Kansas, Oklahoma, Nebraska
- Country: United States

Type section
- Named for: Speiser Township of Richardson County, Nebraska

The Speiser Shale or Speiser Formation is a geologic formation in Kansas, Oklahoma, and Nebraska dating to the early Permian period.

== See also ==
- List of fossiliferous stratigraphic units in Kansas
- Paleontology in Kansas
