= Scranton Formation =

Geologic formation in Kansas, United States

- Stratigraphic range: Carboniferous
- Type: Formation

Location
- Region: Kansas
- Country: United States

The Scranton Formation is a geologic formation in Kansas. It preserves fossils dating back to the Carboniferous period.

== See also ==
- List of fossiliferous stratigraphic units in Kansas
- Paleontology in Kansas
