= Winfield Formation =

Geologic formation in the United States

- Stratigraphic range: Permian
- Type: Formation
- Unit of: Chase Group
- Sub-units: Grant Shale Member
- Underlies: Odell shale
- Overlies: Doyle shale
- Thickness: 30 feet (9 m)

Location
- Region: Nebraska, Kansas, Oklahoma
- Country: United States

Type section
- Named for: Winfield, Kansas

The Winfield Formation, also known as the Winfield limestone, is a geologic formation in Nebraska and extends into Kansas and Oklahoma. It preserves fossils dating back to the Early Permian period.

Brachiopods make up most of the fossils in the Winfield formation, with genera such as Composita being especially common. Some of the other genera present are Derbyia and Juresania. also present but less common is the small Trilobite, Ditomopyge.

Other invertebrate fossils include Fusulinids, Crinoids, Bryozoans, Corals, and a mollusk, Aviculopecten.

== See also ==
- List of fossiliferous stratigraphic units in Nebraska
- Paleontology in Nebraska
