= Foraker Formation =

Geological formation in Nebraska, Kansas and Oklahoma

- Stratigraphic range: Carboniferous
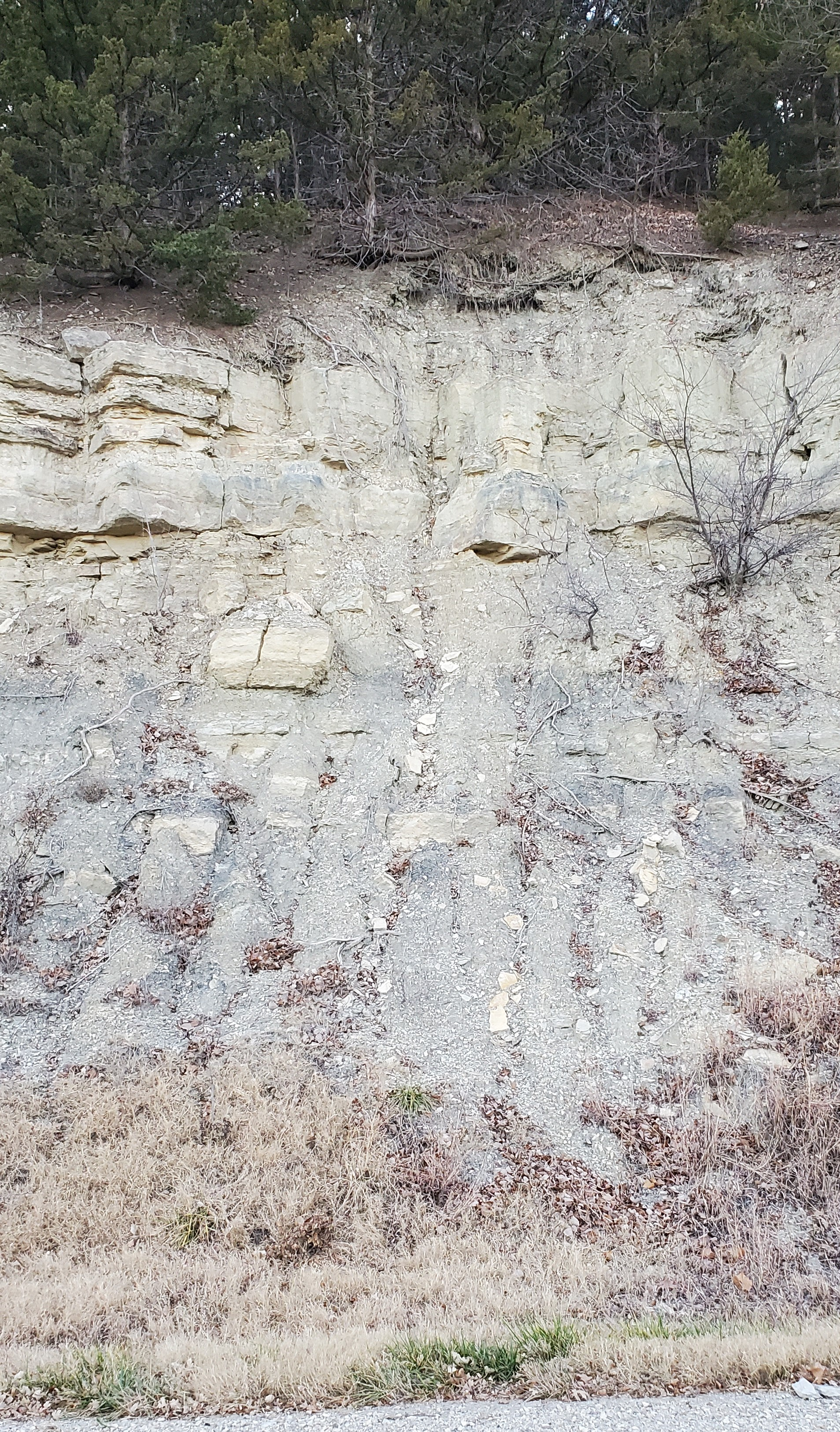
- Roadcut exposure of Foraker Formation, South of Manhattan, KS, on Rosencutter Road.
- Type: Formation
- Unit of: Council Grove Group; Informal: Vanoss Group (OK)
- Sub-units: Long Creek limestone Hughes Creek shale Americus limestone

Lithology
- Primary: Limestone
- Other: Shale

Location
- Region: Midcontinent (Nebraska, Kansas, Oklahoma)
- Country: United States

Type section
- Named for: Foraker, Oklahoma

The Foraker Formation (or Foraker Limestone) is a geologic formation in Nebraska, Kansas, and Oklahoma. It preserves fossils dating to the Carboniferous period.

== See also ==
- List of fossiliferous stratigraphic units in Kansas
- List of fossiliferous stratigraphic units in Nebraska
- List of fossiliferous stratigraphic units in Oklahoma
- Paleontology in Kansas
- Paleontology in Nebraska
- Paleontology in Oklahoma
