= Plattsburg Formation =

Geologic formation in the United States

- Stratigraphic range: Carboniferous
- Type: Formation
- Unit of: Lansing Group
- Sub-units: Spring Hill Limestone Member

Location
- Region: Missouri, Kansas, Nebraska
- Country: United States

The Plattsburg Formation is a geologic formation in Kansas, Missouri and Nebraska. It preserves fossils dating back to the Carboniferous period.

== See also ==
- List of fossiliferous stratigraphic units in Missouri
- Paleontology in Missouri
