= Red Eagle Formation =

Geologic formation in Kansas, Nebraska, and Oklahoma

- Stratigraphic range: Carboniferous-Permian boundary
- Type: Formation
- Unit of: Council Grove Group
- Sub-units: In Kansas and Nebraska: *Howe Limestone; *Bennett Shale; *Glenrock Limestone

Lithology
- Primary: Limestone
- Other: Shale

Location
- Coordinates: 36°52′21″N 96°33′56″W
- Region: Midcontinent (Oklahoma, Kansas, Nebraska)
- Country: United States

Type section
- Named for: Red Eagle School, southwest of Foraker, Oklahoma
- Named by: K.C. Heald
- Year defined: 1916

The Red Eagle Formation (or Red Eagle Limestone) is a geologic formation ranging from Oklahoma, through Kansas, into southeast Nebraska of the United States. Its members define the Carboniferous-Permian boundary in Kansas.

== Lithology ==
In the Oklahoma type location, the Red Eagle is a single limestone unit, not further defined into members. However, from the far southeast Nebraska type section into northern Kansas, the Red Eagle Formation consists of three members, each with distinctive lithologies. In Nebraska and northern Kansas in particular, the formation stands out on riverside bluffs and road cuts as two blocky, light-colored limestones sandwiching a dark layer of shale.

=== Howe Limestone ===
Named from exposures south of Howe, Nebraska, the Howe Limestone member is a grey limestone, 4-5 feet thick, that weathers to buff or slightly yellow. The limestone exhibits brachiopods, baculites, and larger bivalve mollusks. The environment was an open, but very shallow sea with very little in the way of terrigenous sediments. As such, the topmost bed is particularly notable for algae beds and melon-sized stromatolites.

=== Bennett Shale ===
Named from exposures along the Little Nemaha River and its branches south of Bennet, Nebraska, the Bennett Shale member is a dark, carbonaceous shale, 2.5 to 15 feet thick. This very dark shale shows contrasting light-colored, circular, thin-shelled Orbiculoidea, roughly 1cm (1/3") in diameter. However, south of Interstate 70 in Kansas, the member becomes increasing limestone in character to the point that within Oklahoma, the bed is completely limestone and the Red Eagle unit is undivided by any significant shale bed.

The Bennett is the earliest Permian rock unit in Kansas.

=== Glenrock Limestone ===
Named from exposures high in valley sides just northwest of Glenrock, Nebraska, the Glenrock Limestone member is lighter grey. It is a hard limestone; fresh fractures sparkle in full sunlight from tiny calcite crystals.

The Glenrock is the youngest Carboniferous rock unit in Kansas.

== See also ==
- List of fossiliferous stratigraphic units in Nebraska
- List of fossiliferous stratigraphic units in Kansas
- List of fossiliferous stratigraphic units in Oklahoma
- Paleontology in Nebraska
- Paleontology in Kansas
- Paleontology in Oklahoma
