= Grenola Formation =

Geologic formation in the United States

- Stratigraphic range: Early Permian (Wolfcampian)
- Type: Formation
- Sub-units: Neva Limestone; Salem Point Shale; Burr Limestone; Legion Shale; Sallyards Limestone

Lithology
- Primary: Limestone
- Other: Shale

Location
- Region: Midcontinent (Nebraska, Kansas, Oklahoma)
- Country: United States

Type section
- Named for: Grenola, Kansas

The Grenola Formation (or Grenola Limestone) is an early Permian geologic formation (Wolfcampian) with its exposure running north and south through Kansas and extending into Nebraska and Oklahoma, notably having the Neva Limestone member, which is a terrace-forming aquifer and historic Flint Hills building stone source secondary to the Cottonwood Limestone.

== See also ==
- List of fossiliferous stratigraphic units in Kansas
- List of fossiliferous stratigraphic units in Nebraska
- List of fossiliferous stratigraphic units in Oklahoma
- Paleontology in Kansas
- Paleontology in Nebraska
- Paleontology in Oklahoma
