= Auburn Formation =

Geologic formation in Kansas, United States

- Type: Formation

Location
- Region: Kansas
- Country: United States

The Auburn Formation is a geologic formation in Kansas. It preserves fossils from the upper Carboniferous Period.

== See also ==
- List of fossiliferous stratigraphic units in Kansas
- Paleontology in Kansas
