= Derbyia =

Derbyia Temporal range: Carboniferous–Permian

Scientific classification
- Kingdom: Animalia
- Phylum: Brachiopoda
- Class: †Strophomenata
- Order: †Orthotetida
- Family: †Derbyiidae
- Genus: †Derbyia; Waagen, 1884

Species
- Derbyia achengensis Lee and Gu, 1980 Derbyia acutangulata Huang, 1933 Derbyia acutiplicata Metz, 1936 Derbyia aemula Reed, 1944 Derbyia altestriata Waagen, 1884 Derbyia arellanoi Cooper, 1953 Derbyia arizonensis McKee, 1941 Derbyia auriplexa Hoover, 1981 Derbyia baroghilensis Reed, 1925 Derbyia bella Cooper and Grant, 1974 Derbyia bennetti Hall and Clarke, 1892 Derbyia bilobata Jin and Shi, 1985 Derbyia buchi d'Orbigny, 1842 Derbyia buriensis Reed, 1944 Derbyia carteri Cooper and Grant, 1974 Derbyia cincinnata Cooper and Grant, 1974 Derbyia complicata Cooper and Grant, 1974 Derbyia crassa Meek and Hayden, 1858 Derbyia crenulata Girty, 1909 Derbyia cymbula Hall and Clarke, 1892 Derbyia daliangensis Lee and Gu, 1980 Derbyia deltauriculata Hoover, 1981 Derbyia dirata Grant, 1993 Derbyia diversa Reed, 1944 Derbyia dorsoplana Diener, 1915 Derbyia dorsosulcata Liu and Waterhouse, 1985 Derbyia duomaensis Sun, 1983 Derbyia dupliciseptata Grabau, 1931 Derbyia elevata King, 1931 Derbyia elongata Cooper, 1953 Derbyia expansa Schellwien, 1892 Derbyia exserta Sun, 1983 Derbyia filosa Cooper and Grant, 1974 Derbyia gigantea Kalashnikov, 1993 Derbyia grandis Waagen, 1884 Derbyia guidingensis Shen and He, 1994 Derbyia hardmani Thomas, 1958 Derbyia haroubi Angiolini, 1997 Derbyia hemisphaerica Waagen, 1884 Derbyia hooserensis Dunbar and Condra, 1932 Derbyia incurva Abich, 1878 Derbyia informis Cooper and Grant, 1974 Derbyia keokuk Hall, 1858 Derbyia laqueata Cooper and Grant, 1974 Derbyia lotanggangensis Liang, 1982 Derbyia magnus Branson, 1930 Derbyia metzi Gauri, 1965 Derbyia mongolica Grabau, 1931 Derbyia multicostellatus Gauri, 1965 Derbyia multistriata Meek and Hayden, 1859 Derbyia mutabilis Liao, 1980 Derbyia nasuta Girty, 1909 Derbyia nigpi Chen and Liao, 2007 Derbyia nipponensis Nakamura, 1972 Derbyia otoeis Lee and Gu, 1980 Derbyia pannucia Cooper and Grant, 1974 Derbyia pannuciella Xu and Grant, 1994 Derbyia pararegularis Lee and Gu, 1980 Derbyia parasitica Kozlowski, 1914 Derbyia perplexus Waterhouse, 1981 Derbyia plicatella Waagen, 1884 Derbyia postplicatella Waterhouse and Gupta, 1983 Derbyia profunda Cooper and Grant, 1974 Derbyia regis Grant, 1995 Derbyia regularis Waagen, 1884 Derbyia robusta Hall, 1858 Derbyia rudicula Liang, 1990 Derbyia sakamotozawaensis Shintani, 2011 Derbyia schellwieni Frech, 1911 Derbyia scitula Cooper and Grant, 1974 Derbyia scobina Grant, 1976 Derbyia senbaensis Jin and Shi, 1985 Derbyia simplicis Lee and Gu, 1980 Derbyia speciosa Yang, 1984 Derbyia striolata Lee and Gu, 1980 Derbyia strophomenoidea Cooper and Grant, 1974 Derbyia subaurita Reed, 1944 Derbyia subsinuata Reed, 1944 Derbyia sulca Branson, 1930 Derbyia sulcata Walter, 1953 Derbyia sultanensis Reed, 1944 Derbyia texta Cooper and Grant, 1974 Derbyia vercherei Waagen, 1884 Derbyia waageni Schellwien, 1892 Derbyia wabaunseensis Dunbar and Condra, 1932 Derbyia yeerqiangensis Chen and Shi, 2006 Derbyia yongjiensis Lee and Gu, 1980 Derbyia yukisawensis Tazawa and Shintani, 2014

Extinct genus of derbyiid brachiopod

Derbyia is an extinct genus of derbyiid brachiopod that lived during the Carboniferous and Permian periods.

== Description ==
The protegulum of Derbyia was 275–450 μm in diameter. Slightly raised above the brephic shell, the protegulum was.
