= Admire Group =

Geologic group in Nebraska, U.S.

- Stratigraphic range: Carboniferous
- Type: Group
- Underlies: Council Grove Group
- Overlies: Wabaunsee Group

Location
- Region: Nebraska
- Country: United States

The Admire Group is a geologic group in Nebraska. It preserves fossils dating back to the Carboniferous period.

== See also ==
- List of fossiliferous stratigraphic units in Nebraska
- Paleontology in Nebraska
