= Paleontology in Kansas =

Paleontological research in the U.S. state of Kansas

The location of the state of Kansas

Paleontology in Kansas refers to paleontological research occurring within or conducted by people from the U.S. state of Kansas. Kansas has been the source of some of the most spectacular fossil discoveries in US history. The fossil record of Kansas spans from the Cambrian to the Pleistocene. From the Cambrian to the Devonian, Kansas was covered by a shallow sea. During the ensuing Carboniferous the local sea level began to rise and fall. When sea levels were low the state was home to richly vegetated deltaic swamps where early amphibians and reptiles lived. Seas expanded across most of the state again during the Permian, but on land the state was home to thousands of different insect species. The popular pterosaur Pteranodon is best known from this state. During the early part of the Cenozoic era Kansas became a savannah environment. Later, during the Ice Age, glaciers briefly entered the state, which was home to camels, mammoths, mastodons, and saber-teeth. Local fossils may have inspired Native Americans to regard some local hills as the homes of sacred spirit animals. Major scientific discoveries in Kansas included the pterosaur Pteranodon and a fossil of the fish Xiphactinus that died in the act of swallowing another fish.

== Prehistory ==
The Western Interior Seaway 95 million years ago.

No Precambrian fossils are known from Kansas, so the state's fossil record does not begin until the Paleozoic era. Kansas From the Cambrian to the Devonian, Kansas was covered by a shallow sea. The Cambrian life of Kansas left behind few fossils. The state's sea levels began to fluctuate during the Carboniferous period. While the state was still covered by the sea, it was home to a rich variety of marine invertebrates. During the later half of the Carboniferous, the Pennsylvanian, nautiloids could be found in Franklin County. Other kinds of marine invertebrates could be found in Anderson County. Paleoniscid fishes swam in the waterways of Douglas County. Some of their fossils have preserved the fishes' soft parts. Fish fossils of this age were also preserved in Anderson County. During the drier intervals Kansas was home to great coastal swamps with a rich flora included ferns and scale trees. These swamps were responsible for leaving behind great coal deposits. The local flora also left behind remains that would later fossilize in what are now southern Labette County and Montgomery County. The plant Walchia grew in Anderson County, although its fossils are rare. The contemporary terrestrial environments of Kansas were home to invertebrates like scorpions. They were also home to amphibians and early reptiles. Such contemporary tetrapods left behind footprints in Kansas that would later fossilize. Among these were tracks of the ichnogenus Limnopus. Other fossils from this time period include Wakarusopus tracks left behind in Douglas County by a colossal amphibian that would have weighed several hundred pounds in life. Pennsylvanian amphibian remains were also preserved in Anderson County. Primitive reptiles left behind remains that were preserved in Anderson County, near the town of Garnett.

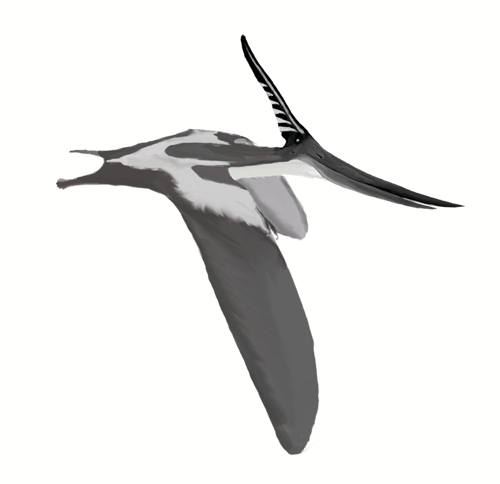
Pteranodon.

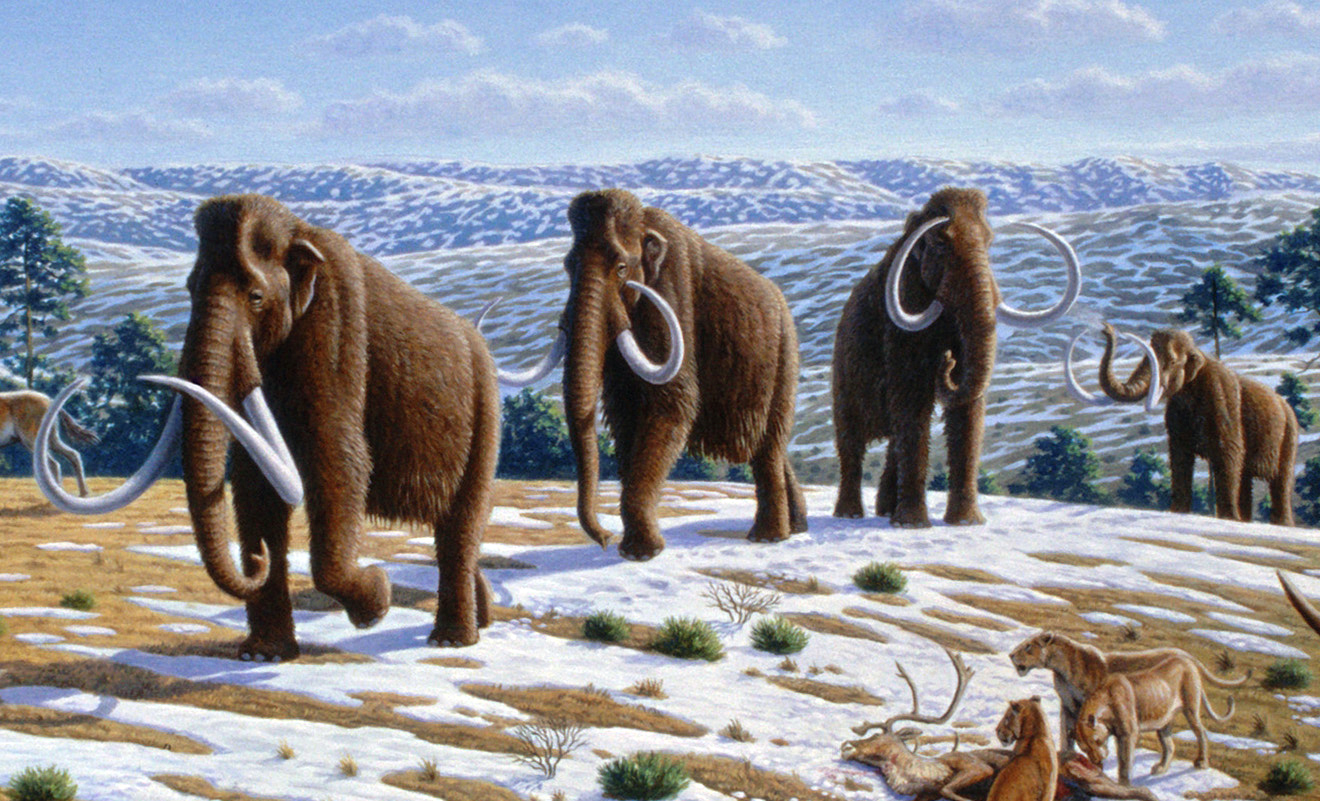
Restoration of a herd in a late Pleistocene landscape of northern Spain, by Mauricio Antón

Most of the Permian rocks in Kansas were deposited in marine environments. This setting was home to algae, brachiopods, bryozoans, fusulinids, ostracods, pelecypods, and trilobites. The brachiopod genus Chonotes was common here. On land, the area around Elmo in Dickinson County was home to more than ten thousand species of insects. These lived among a flora that included conifers which left behind fossils in the Garnett region.

For the last 70 million years of the Cretaceous period, Kansas was covered by a shallow sea. This body of water is known as the Western Interior Sea. The seafloor was smooth and probably never submerged by more than 600 feet of water. A great diversity of invertebrates flourished both on the bottom and in the water column. Examples include ammonites, giant clams, crinoids, rudists, and squid. Vertebrate life included bony fishes, mosasaurs, plesiosaurs, sharks, and turtles. Carcasses of dinosaurs like Niobrarasaurus coleii were occasionally preserved after drifting hundreds of miles out into the Seaway. Other dinosaurs endemic to Kansas include the hadrosauromorph Claosaurus, and nodosaurs like Hierosaurus, Silvisaurus, and the previously mentioned Niobrarasaurus. Cretaceous plants left behind fossil leaves in Ellsworth County. Flying above the waters of the Seaway was the great pterosaur Pteranodon, which may have migrated across the sea.

During the Tertiary, specifically during the Miocene, Kansas was a savannah subjected to greater rainfall and a more moderate climate, with fossilized crocodile remains being unearthed here as well as in the neighbouring states of Oklahoma and Nebraska. Fossils of Miocene era rhinos, mainly Teleoceras, the giant camel Titanotylopus, and tapirs have been unearthed in Kansas. Later in the Cenozoic, during the Quaternary, glaciers intruded southward into the northeastern part of the state, although they stayed only briefly. Much of Quaternary Kansas was covered in coniferous forests and savannahs. These environments were home to creatures like camels, saber-toothed cats, Ground Sloths, mammoths, and mastodons. Other examples of Pleistocene life in Kansas include bison, horses, and peccaries. These left behind fossils in the western half of the state.

== History ==
=== Indigenous interpretations ===
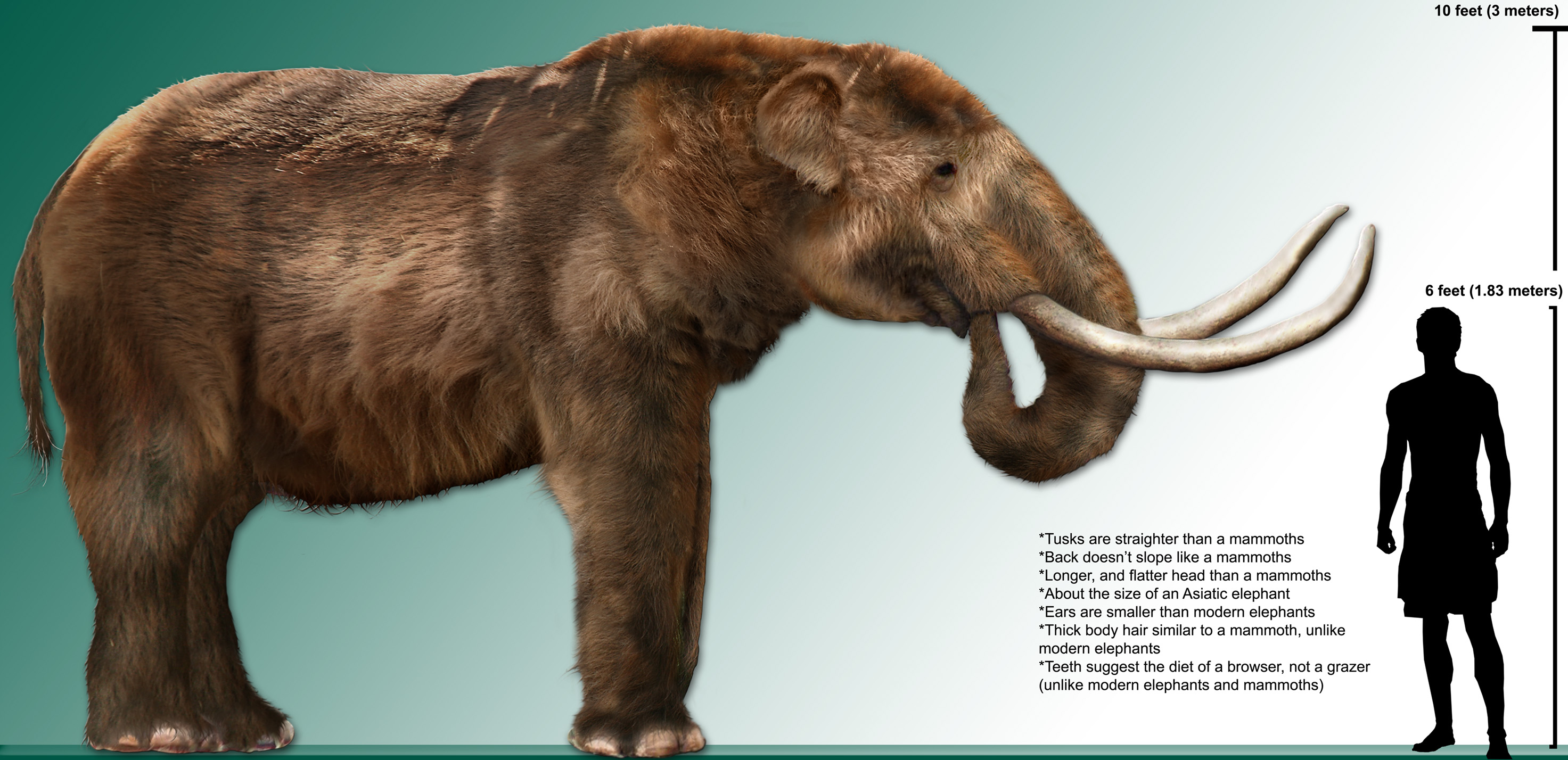
Life restoration of M. americanum

The Pawnee believed in nahurac, or spirit animals thought to inhabit some of the region's hills. In Kansas, the spirit mound Pahowa was located not far from Glen Elder on the Solomon River. Pahowa was a forty-foot limestone formation with a minor pool on top that was fed by a spring. Pahowa was regarded as sacred by several local tribes. Spirit mounds were likely designated as such on the basis that their sediments preserved the fossilized remains of unusual extinct animals.

Indigenous peoples in Kansas have ground fossil bones like mastodon remains for medicinal purposes. They attributed the fossils to the great buffalo who lived long ago when the Happy Hunting Ground was on earth, before the Great Spirit "removed [it] beyond the clouds" to punish people for immoral behavior. As white settlers advanced westward and the buffalo herds went in precipitous decline, the great buffalo known only from fossil remains became a "nostalgi[c]" symbol of the once vast herds the local Indigenous people hunted. This contrasts with similar interpretations of mastodon fossils as the remains of giant buffalo from the mythic past told among the Delaware and Iroquois people in the eastern United States. These eastern legends portrayed the destruction of the great buffalo as beneficial because the creature was a danger to humans and the wild game they depended on for food.

=== Scientific research ===
In 1859, Joseph Leidy reported two shark teeth and a dorsal fin spine left by three different kinds of shark from the Carboniferous of Kansas. These were the first vertebrate fossils in the state to be reported to the scientific literature. Later, in 1865, Judge E. P. West discovered a rich source of fossil plants in Ellsworth County. Each fossil was a leaf preserved in an individual ironstone concretion. After West's discovery Charles H. Sternberg performed several years of fieldwork in the area, turning up hundreds of the fossiliferous nodules.

In 1867 a United States Army surgeon named Dr. Theophilus Turner discovered a nearly complete plesiosaur skeleton in what is now Logan County while stationed at Fort Wallace. This was the first plesiosaur specimen of this caliber discovered in all of North America. Dr. Turner gave some of the vertebrae to a member of the Union Pacific railroad survey named John LeConte. He in turn gave the bones to paleontologist Edward Drinker Cope, who identified them as the remains of a very large plesiosaur. Cope wrote a letter to Dr. Turner requesting that he send him the rest of the skeleton. Turner obliged and in the middle of March, 1868 Cope received the remainder of the fossils. Within two weeks of receiving the specimen, Cope made a presentation at the March 24th meeting of the Academy of Natural Sciences in Philadelphia. He named the creature Elasmosaurus platyurus, although in his hasty work he mistakenly reconstructed it with its head at the end of the tail instead of its neck.

In 1870, O. C. Marsh led a paleontological expedition into the western United States on behalf of Yale University. Late in the November of that year they visited the area around Fort Wallace. They spent several days prospecting for fossils in modern Wallace and Logan Counties along the banks of the Smoky Hill River. Persevering against cold weather, they made several finds. One was the nearly complete skeleton of the mosasaur Clidastes that took four days to excavate. Among the fossils discovered by Marsh's crew in western Kansas were the far ends of two pterosaur wing metacarpals. These were the first scientifically documented fossils of the pterosaur that would later be named Pteranodon. This formal naming occurred six years later, in 1876.

In 1877 Benjamin Franklin Mudge became one of the first researcher to attest to the presence of fossil "shark mummies" of the Cretaceous shark Cretoxyrhina. One such specimen was discovered in Gove County at Hackberry Creek in 1891 by George Hazelius Sternberg. Later, his son George F. Sternberg discovered another shark mummy in the same general area as his father.

In 1894, Othniel Charles Marsh erected the ichnogenus Limnopus for fossil footprints discovered in a Carboniferous-aged coal deposit.

Early in the 20th century the sixth labyrinthodont amphibian discovery was made somewhere in Kansas. The remains included a partial skull and jaws with fourteen teeth for which the new genus and species Erpetosuchus kansensis was erected. The fossils were labeled as originating in Washington County but none of the local geology is of a suitable type from which the specimen could be expected to originate. The source of the fossils remains mysterious. Early in 1962 reports of two beds rich in fossil insects newly discovered in Kansas and Oklahoma began circulating in science periodicals. The older of these was called Wellington XVIII and was located in Sumner County. The younger one was Oklahoman.

In 1940 R. W. Brown first reported the presence of fossil pearls in the Niobrara and Benton Formations in Kansas. Many of these were originally collected by George F. Sternberg in the area west of Hays. The pearl fossils have lost the shiny outer coating, or nacre, leaving them dull grey or brown in color. 50 of these ended up being donated by Sternberg to the Smithsonian Institution.

In spring 1952 an American Museum of Natural History team was performing field work with George Sternberg in Gove County. A member of the AMNH team named Walter Sorenson discovered a fossil tail fin from the fish Xiphactinus audax eroding out of the rock. The Museum workers didn't have time to excavate the specimen, so they left it for Sternberg and his team. Sternberg and other excavators finished uncovering the Xiphactinus only to find that the specimen was one of the best preserved ever discovered. Further, the 13 feet (4.0 m) long Xiphactinus preserved an entire 6 feet (1.8 m) Gillicus arcuatus within its ribcage. The Gillicus was undigested so the Xiphactinus must have died quickly after swallowing its last meal. The cause of death may have been internal injuries due to the prey's large size or dying struggles. The specimen is now known as the "fish-in-a-fish" specimen and is catalogued by the Sternberg Museum of Natural History as FHSM VP-333 (Xiphactinus) and FHSM VP-334 (Gillicus).

In 1956 western Kansas field paleontologist Marion Charles Bonner donated a nearly complete specimen of the short-necked plesiosaur Dolichorhynchops osborni to the Sternberg Museum of Natural History catalogued as FHSM VP-404.

In 1963 George Sternberg discovered a fossil in Trego County to the northwest of WaKeeney. The specimen, catalogued as FHSM VP-401, is the most complete known skeleton of the mosasaur Ectenosaurus clidastoides. Only the tail and rear paddles were missing. Significantly, this specimen preserved actual impressions of the animal's skin.

== People ==
=== Births ===
- Barnum Brown was born in Carbondale on February 12, 1873.
- Carl Owen Dunbar was born in Hallowell on January 1, 1891 .
- Leo George Hertlein was born in Pratt County in 1898.
- Claude W. Hibbard was born in Toronto on March 21, 1905.
- Charles Mortram Sternberg was born in Lawrence in 1885.

=== Deaths ===
- Benjamin Franklin Mudge died in Manhattan on November 21, 1879 at age 62.
- Elmer S. Riggs died in Sedan on March 25, 1963 at age 94.

== Natural history museums ==
- Fick Fossil & History Museum, Oakley
- Johnston Geology Museum, Emporia
- Sternberg Museum of Natural History, Hays
- McPherson Museum, McPherson
- Museum at Prairiefire, Overland Park
- University of Kansas Natural History Museum, Lawrence

== See also ==
- Paleontology in Colorado
- Paleontology in Oklahoma
- Paleontology in Missouri
- Paleontology in Nebraska
