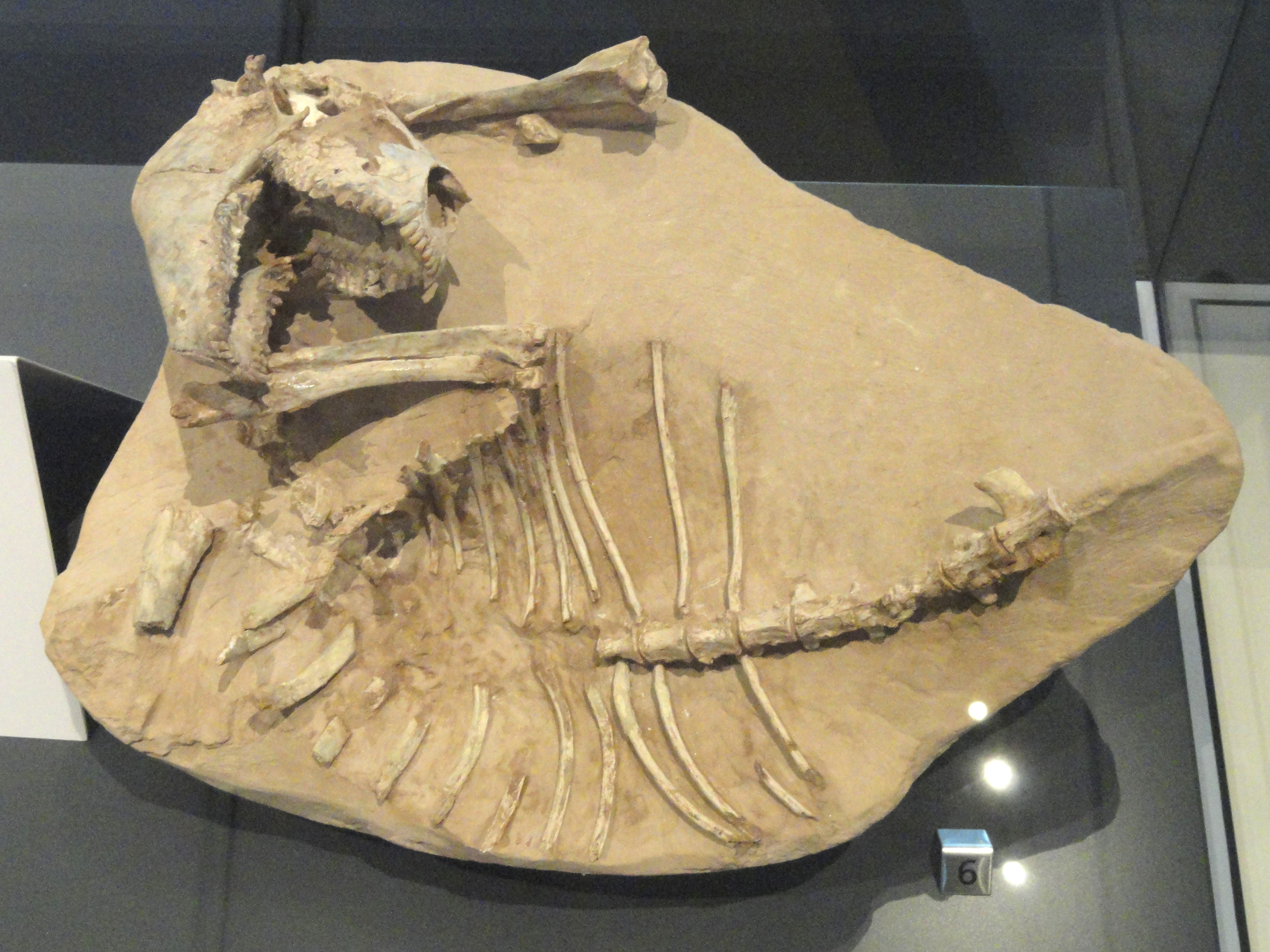
- M. elegans fossil, Royal Ontario Museum

Scientific classification
- Kingdom: Animalia
- Phylum: Chordata
- Class: Mammalia
- Order: Artiodactyla
- Family: †Merycoidodontidae
- Genus: †Merychyus; Leidy 1858

Type species
- †Merychyus elegans Leidy 1858

Species
- M. arenarum Cope, 1884; M. calaminthus Jahns, 1940; M. elegans Leidy, 1858 (type); M. minimus Peterson, 1907; M. relictus Matthew & Cook, 1909; M. verrucomalus Stevens, 1970

Synonyms
- Metoreodon Matthew & Cook, 1909

= Merychyus =

Merychyus Temporal range: Miocene (late Arikareean - early Barstovian) ~20.4–15 Ma

Extinct genus of mammals

Merychyus is an extinct genus of oreodont of the family Merycoidodontidae, endemic to North America. It lived during the Miocene, about 20.4–15 million years ago (late Arikareean to early Barstovian). Fossils are widespread through the central and western United States.

Merychyus was a herbivore with a short face, tusk-like canine teeth, heavy body, long tail, short feet, and four-toed hooves.

== Paleoecology ==
Fossils of Merychyus have been uncovered from Agate Fossil Beds National Monument. Merychyus was a common prey item for the beardog Daphoenodon, as over half of all herbivore remains uncovered from Daphoenodon burrows at Agate Fossil Beds belonged to Merychyus.

== Fossil distribution ==
Fossils of the genus have been found in:

Arikareean

- Chalk Canyon Formation, Arizona
- Diligencia, Sespe & Tick Canyon Formations, California
- Arikaree Formation, North Dakota
- John Day Formation, Oregon
- Delaho Formation, Texas
- Colter, Harrison & Marsland Formations, Wyoming

Harrisonian

- Hector Formation, California
- Agate Springs, Harrison, Marsland & Wildcat Hills Beds Formations, Nebraska
- Rosebud Formation, South Dakota
- Delaho Formation, Texas
- Harrison & Marsland Formations, Wyoming

Other Miocene

- Cypress Hills Formation, Hemingfordian Saskatchewan, Canada
- Suchilquitongo Formation, Mexico
- Barstow, Bopesta, Branch Canyon, Hector, Kramer Beds & Vaqueros Formations, California
- Browns Park & Pawnee Creek Formations, Colorado
- Railroad Canyon Beds Formation, Idaho
- Fleming Formation, Louisiana
- Runningwater, Sheep Creek, Olcott, Loop Fork, Box Butte, Valentine & Ash Hollow Formations, Nebraska
- Truckee & Monarch Mill Formations, Nevada
- Tesuque, Zia Sand & Abiquiu Formations, New Mexico
- Laverne Formation, Oklahoma
- Juntura & John Day Formations, Oregon
- Arikaree & Batesland Formations, South Dakota
- Goliad Formation, Texas
- Marsland, Colter, North Park, Arikaree & Carpenter Ranch Formations, Wyoming
