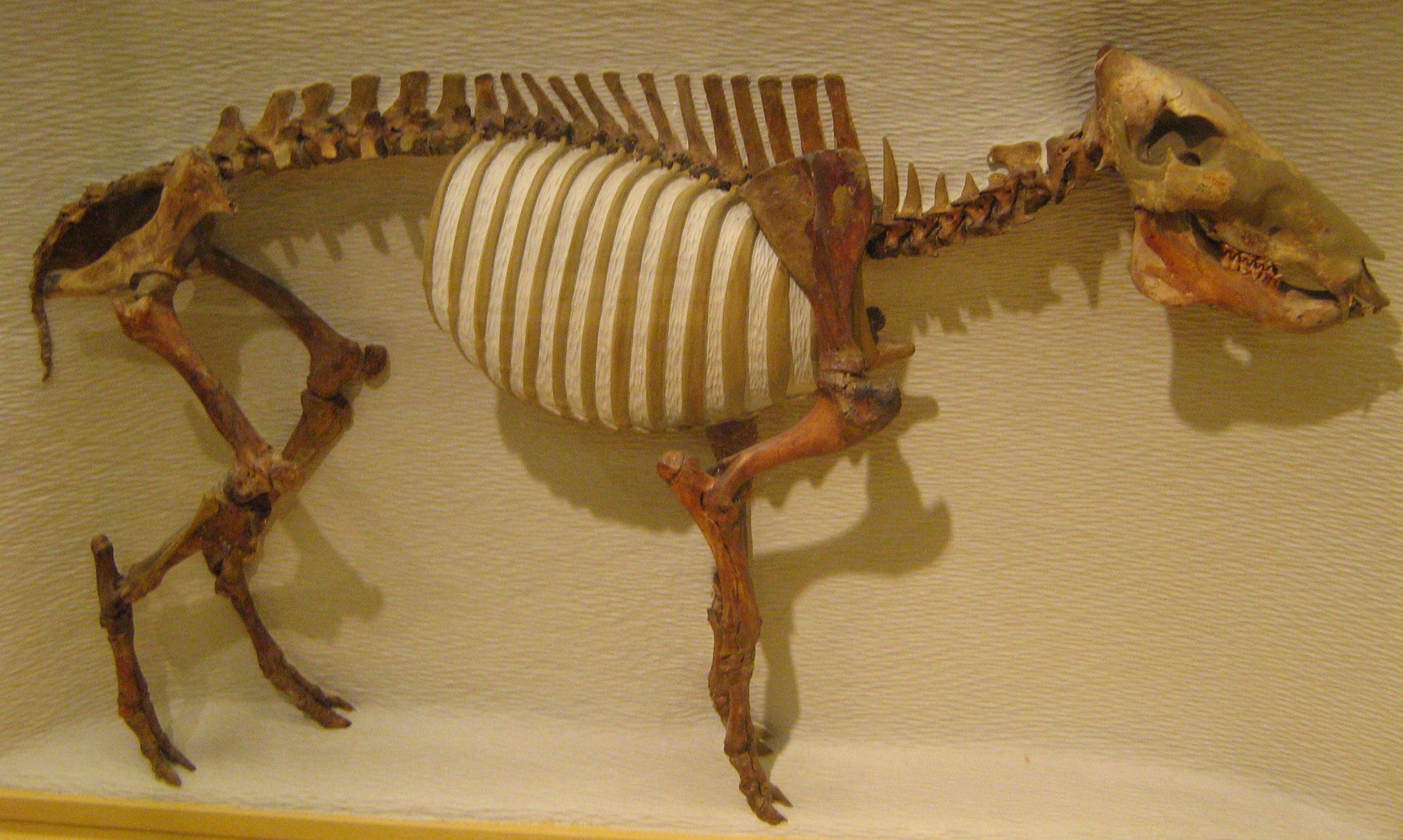
- Platygonus compressus skeleton at Harvard University

Scientific classification
- Kingdom: Animalia
- Phylum: Chordata
- Class: Mammalia
- Order: Artiodactyla
- Family: Tayassuidae
- Genus: †Platygonus; LeConte 1848

Type species
- †Platygonus compressus LeConte 1848

Species
- See text

Synonyms
- Euchoerus Leidy 1853; Hyops LeConte 1848; Protochoerus LeConte 1848; Selenogonus Stirton 1947

= Platygonus =

Platygonus Temporal range: Late Miocene-Late Pleistocene ~10.3–0.011 Ma

Extinct genus of mammals

Platygonus ("flat head" in reference to the straight shape of the forehead) is an extinct genus of herbivorous peccaries of the family Tayassuidae, endemic to North and South America from the Miocene through Pleistocene epochs (10.3 million to 11,000 years ago), existing for about 10.289 million years. P. compressus stood 2.5 feet (0.76 meters) tall.

== Taxonomy ==
While long thought to be the sister-lineage to the Chacoan peccary based on morphological similarities, a 2017 ancient DNA study which recovered mitochondrial DNA from Platygonus found that all living peccaries are more closely related to each other than they are to Platygonus. The estimated divergence between Platygonus and all living peccaries was placed in the Miocene, around 22 million years ago.

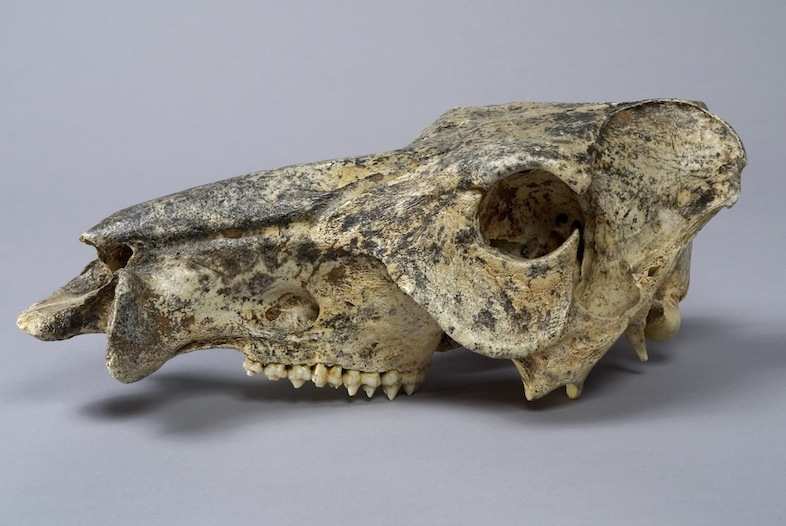
Platygonus compressus skull in The Children's Museum of Indianapolis

Platygonus was named by John Lawrence LeConte in 1848 for fossils found in Pleistocene karst deposits in Illinois, which are now preserved in the Academy of National Sciences in Philadelphia.

== Species ==
The following species of Platygonus have been described:

- P. bicalcaratus (nomen dubium)
- P. brachirostris
- P. chapadmalensis
- P. cinctus
- P. compressus (type)
- P. kraglievichi
- P. marplatensis
- P. narinoensis
- P. oregonensis
- P. pearcei
- P. pollenae
- P. scagliae
- P. setiger
- P. striatus
- P. texanus
- P. vetus

== Description ==
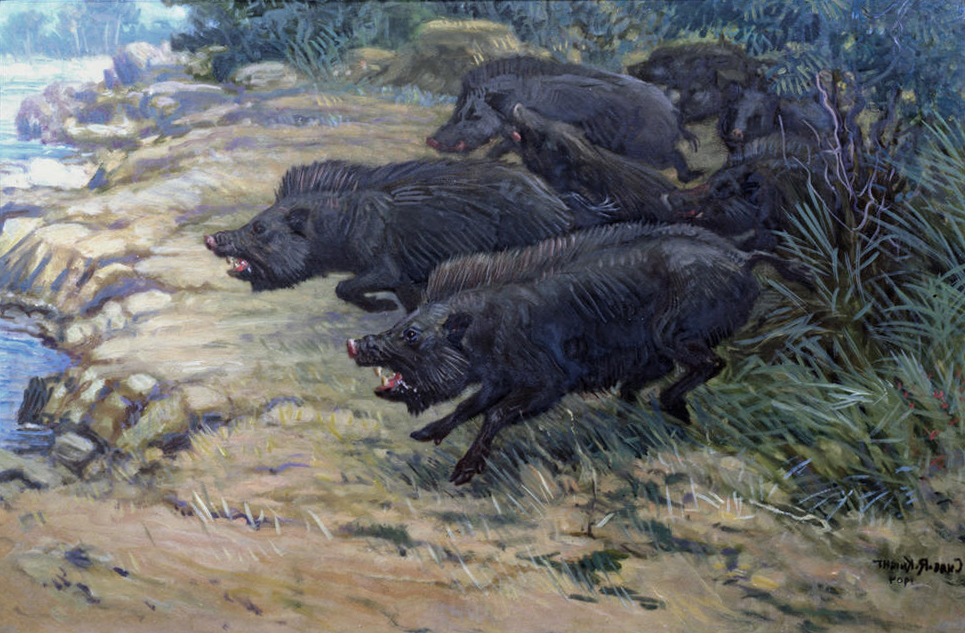
Restoration by Charles R. Knight

Most Platygonus species were similar in size to modern peccaries especially giant peccary, at around 1 m (3.3 ft) in body length, and had long legs, allowing them to run well. They also had a pig-like snout and long tusks that were probably used to fend off predators.

== Ecology ==
Like modern peccaries, Platygonus is thought to have lived in herds. Their remains are particularly abundant in caves, suggesting that they regularly used them. A study on the population structure of a population of P. compressus from Bat Cave, Missouri found that they had a similar demographic structure to modern peccaries, dominated by young adults, with a progressive attenuation of older adults due to predation and old-age, up to a maximum age of around 10 years. Platygonus is thought to have consumed tough foliage like leaves and grass. Platygonus preferred warm, temperate environments, and its presence at a site in areas like the Northeastern United States is used as an indicator of interglacial conditions.

== Distribution ==
During the Late Pleistocene, Platygonus was most common in Eastern North America, with records in the Great Plains and western North America being more sparse. In South America, Platygonus ranged from Colombia to Argentina.

== Fossil localities ==
Fossils of Platygonus have been found in:

Miocene

- Sheep Creek Formation, Nebraska

Chapadmalalan

- Chapadmalal Formation, Argentina

Hemphillian

- Beecher Island, Colorado
- Edson Beds, Kansas
- Rancho Viejo Beds, Mexico
- Devil's Nest Airstrip, Ogallala Group, Nebraska
- McKay and Rattlesnake Formations, Oregon
- Miami Quarry, Texas

Blancan

- Gila Conglomerate and St. David Formation, Arizona
- Palm Spring and San Diego Formations, California
- Tamiami Formation, Florida
- Glenns Ferry Formations, Idaho
- Ballard, Rexroad and Crooked Creek Formations, Kansas
- Rancho Viejo Beds, Mexico
- Tequixquiac, Mexico
- Panaca Formation, Nevada
- Camp Rice Formation, New Mexico
- Blanco and Love Formations, Texas
- Ringold Formation, Washington

Plio-Pleistocene

- Cocha Verde, Taminango, Colombia

Pleistocene

- Tarija Formation, Bolivia
- Palm Spring and Turlock Lake Formations, California
- Bermont and Wicomico Formations, Florida
- Yarbrough Cave, Georgia
- American Falls Lake Bed E Formation, Idaho
- Galena, Illinois (type locality)
- Harrodsburg Crevice, Indiana
- Turin Pit, Iowa
- Kingsdown and Crooked Creek Formations, Kansas
- Welch Cave, Kentucky
- Cumberland Bone Cave and Bushey Cavern, Maryland
- Tacubaya Formation, Mexico
- Geddes Lake barrow pit, Michigan
- Little Beaver Cave, Jacob's Cave, and Zoo Cave, Missouri
- Sappa Formation, Nebraska
- Dry Cave, New Mexico
- Sheriden Cave, Ohio
- Holloman Gravel Pit, Oklahoma
- Fossil Lake, Oregon
- Hanover Quarry and Platygonus vetus type locality, Pennsylvania
- Hot Springs Mammoth Site, South Dakota
- Laubach Cave, Seymour, Tule and Shuler Formations, Texas
- Early's Cave, Gardner's Cave, New Quarry Cave, Vickers Cave, Ruffners Cave, Virginia
- Hamilton Cave, Trout Cave, Poorfarm Cave, Patton Cave, West Virginia
- Hastings Highlands, Ontario
- Wellsch Valley, Saskatchewan
- Old Crow Flats, Yukon
