= Snake Creek Formation =

Geologic formation in Nebraska

- Stratigraphic range: Neogene (Clarendonian - Hemphillian)
- Type: Formation
- Unit of: Ogallala Group
- Sub-units: Murphy Member, Laucomer Member, Johnson Member
- Overlies: Sheep Creek Formation, Olcott Formation

Lithology
- Primary: sand
- Other: gravel, clay, volcanic ash

Location
- Region: Sioux County, Nebraska
- Country: United States

The Snake Creek Formation is a Neogene-age geological formation in Nebraska. It is the youngest formation exposed in south-central Sioux County, between Agate and Mitchell, as a remnant of an ancient deep river valley. The Snake Creek Formation is latest Middle Miocene to earliest Early Pliocene (Clarendonian to Hemphillian NALMAs) in age and represents further ancient stream cuts into the Sheep Creek and Olcott formations. The Snake Creek Formation is sometimes known as the Snake Creek beds, though it does not include the "lower Snake Creek beds" of the Olcott Formation. The Snake Creek Formation is part of the Ogallala Group.

== Geology ==
The Snake Creek Formation is mostly fluvial (river and stream) sand, though coarser gravel marks sharp erosional surfaces cut into underlying strata. The formation can be divided into three members:

- Murphy Member: Consolidated (compressed) pink-tan-grey sand found on Murphy Ranch around Olcott Hill, as well as ancient slumps on Johnson Ranch. This member cuts at least 16–32 ft (4.9–9.8 m) into the Sheep Creek and Olcott formations. Some older sources mistake the Murphy Member for the Sheep Creek Formation, complicating its study. The Murphy Member represents sediments from the early Clarendonian, though fossils are uncommon.
- Laucomer Member: Unconsolidated quartz sand found on Laucomer and Murphy ranches around Olcott Hill. This member cuts up to 47 ft (14 m) into the Murphy Member and corresponds to a more intense stream akin to the modern Niobrara River. The Laucomer Member represents sediments from the late Clarendonian. Fossils are mainly found as water-weathered fragments inside gravel-filled pockets of ancient stream potholes. A band of silvery-grey volcanic ash covers the Laucomber Member near the top of Olcott Hill.
- Johnson Member: A variety of sand and gravel facies on Johnson Ranch, cut into the Sheep Creek Formation or lying on top of Murphy Member slumps. Some cuts could reach 70 ft (21 m) deep. The deeper part of Johnson Member cuts are generally similar to the Laucomer Member, though with more red granite and pegmatite gravel and no ash layer. Layers of clay, bedded or unbedded sand, and point bar deposits occur further up in the cut. The Johnson Member represents sediments from the Hemphillian, including the fossil-rich Aphelops Draw local fauna (early Hemphillian) and the Pliohippus Draw or ZX Bar local fauna (late Hemphillian).

== Paleobiota ==
From Skinner et al. (1977) unless cited otherwise:

=== Birds ===
Birds of the Snake Creek Formation
Genus / Taxon	Species	NALMA	Strata	Notes	Images
Antigone	A. canadensis?	late Clarendonian	Laucomer Member	A crane, indistinguishable from the sandhill crane. Previously Megalornis pratensis or Grus canadensis.	
Aramus	A. sp.			A limpkin	
†Boreortalis	B. phengites	late Clarendonian	Laucomer Member	A chachalaca	
Geranoaetus (Buteo)	†G. (B.) conterminus	early Hemphillian	Johnson Member	A buteonine hawk	

=== Mammals ===
==== Artiodactyla ====
Artiodactyls of the Snake Creek Formation
Genus / Taxon	Species	NALMA	Strata	Notes	Images
†Aepycamelus	A. major	Hemphillian		The slender "giraffe camel", a lamine related to llamas	
†Cranioceras	C. unicornis	late Clarendonian - early Hemphillian	Laucomer Member, Johnson Member	A dromomerycid (deer-like horned mammal)	
†Longirostromeryx	L. wellsi	late Clarendonian - late Hemphillian	Laucomer Member, Johnson Member	A blastomerycine moschid (musk deer)	
†Megatylopus	M. gigas	late Hemphillian	Johnson Member	A giant camelin camel	
†Megatylopus	M. sp.	early Hemphillian	Johnson Member	A giant camelin camel	
†Neotragocerus	N. improvisus	Hemphillian	Johnson Member	A "boselaphin" (nilgai-like bovid), the earliest bovid in North America.	
†Pediomeryx	P. hemphillensis	late Hemphillian	Johnson Member	A dromomerycid (deer-like horned mammal)	
†Procamelus	P. occidentalis	early Clarendonian	Murphy Member	An early camelin camel	
†Procamelus	P. webbi	Hemphillian		An early camelin camel	
†Prosthennops	P. haroldcookii	late Clarendonian	Laucomer Member	An infamous worn peccary molar, previously known as "Hesperopithecus haroldcookii". Osborn (1922), who named it, mistakenly classified the fossil as a North American great ape.	
†Prosthennops	P. serus	late Hemphillian	Johnson Member	A peccary	
†Prosthennops	P. sp.	early Clarendonian	Murphy Member	A peccary	
†Texoceros	T. altidens	early Hemphillian	Johnson Member	An antilocaprid (pronghorn)	
†Ustatochoerus	U. major	early Clarendonian - early Hemphillian	Murphy Member, Johnson Member	One of the last surviving oreodonts	
†Ustatochoerus	U. cf. U. major	late Hemphillian	Johnson Member	One of the last surviving oreodonts	
†Ustatochoerus	U. profectus	late Clarendonian	Laucomer Member	One of the last surviving oreodonts	

==== Carnivora ====
Carnivorans of the Snake Creek Formation
Genus / Taxon	Species	NALMA	Strata	Notes	Images
†Aelurodon	A. taxoides	late Clarendonian - early Hemphillian?	Laucomer Member, Johnson Member?	A borophagine dog, previously known as Tomarctus propter. The Johnson Member fossils may have been reworked, as Aelurodon is not known from the Hemphillian elsewhere.	
†Arctonasua	A. eurybates	late Hemphillian	Johnson Member	A procyonid (coati relative)	
†Borophagus	B. secundus	Hemphillian	Johnson Member	A borophagine dog	
†Cynarctus	C. crucidens	late Clarendonian	Laucomer Member	A borophagine dog	
†Epicyon	E. haydeni	late Clarendonian - early Hemphillian	Laucomer Member, Johnson Member	A borophagine dog	
†Epicyon	E. saevus	late Clarendonian - early Hemphillian	Laucomer Member, Johnson Member	A borophagine dog	
†Huracan	H. coffeyi	late Hemphillian	Johnson Member	An agriotheriin bear	
†Ischyrocyon	I. sp.	late Clarendonian	Laucomer Member	An amphicyonid ("bear-dog")	
†Leptarctus	L. sp.	early Hemphillian	Johnson Member	A leptarctine mustelid similar to a badger or raccoon.	
†Leptocyon	L. matthewi	late Clarendonian	Laucomer Member	A fox-like early canine	
†Mionictis	M. pristina	late Clarendonian	Laucomer Member	An otter, previously considered a species of Brachypsaloides or Lutra.	
†Amphimachairodus	A. coloradensis	early Hemphillian	Johnson Member	A saber-toothed cat	
†Pliotaxidea	P. nevadensis	late Hemphillian	Johnson Member	A taxidiine (American badger).	
Vulpes	†V. stenognathus	early Hemphillian	Johnson Member	A true fox	

==== Eulipotyphla ====
Eulipotyphla of the Snake Creek Formation
Genus / Taxon	Species	NALMA	Strata	Notes	Images
†Gaillardia	G. thomsoni	late Hemphillian	Johnson Member	A desman	

==== Lagomorpha ====
Lagomorphs of the Snake Creek Formation
Genus / Taxon	Species	NALMA	Strata	Notes	Images
†Hypolagus	H. cf. vetus	early Clarendonian	Murphy Member	A rabbit	

==== Perissodactyla ====
Perissodactyls of the Snake Creek Formation
Genus / Taxon	Species	NALMA	Strata	Notes	Images
†Aphelops	A. mutilis	early Hemphillian	Johnson Member	A very large aceratheriine (short-legged hornless rhino)	
†Cormohipparion	C. occidentale	late Clarendonian	Laucomer Member	A common hipparionin horse	
†Dinohippus	D. leidyanus	Hemphillian	Johnson Member	An abundant equin horse, previously considered a species of Pliohippus	
†Nannippus	N. lenticularis	early Hemphillian	Johnson Member	A hipparionin horse	
†Neohipparion	N. affine	late Clarendonian	Laucomer Member	An uncommon hipparionin horse	
†Neohipparion	N. eurystyle	early Hemphillian	Johnson Member	An uncommon hipparionin horse	
†Teleoceras	T. major			An aceratheriine (short-legged hornless rhino)	

==== Proboscidea ====
Proboscideans of the Snake Creek Formation
Genus / Taxon	Species	NALMA	Strata	Notes	Images
†Mammut	M. matthewi	early Hemphillian	Johnson Member	A mastodon, previously known as Pliomastodon.	
†"Rhynchotherium"	"R." anguirivalis	late Clarendonian - early Hemphillian	Laucomer Member, Johnson Member	A dubious gomphothere	
†Stegomastodon	S. nebrascensis	late Clarendonian - early Hemphillian	Laucomer Member, Johnson Member	An advanced gomphothere	

==== Rodentia ====
Rodents of the Snake Creek Formation
Genus / Taxon	Species	NALMA	Strata	Notes	Images
Castor	†C. cf. californicus	early Hemphillian	Johnson Member	A beaver	
†Ceratogaulus	C. cornutasagma			A mylagaulid ("horned gopher")	
†Dipoides	D. sp.	early Hemphillian	Johnson Member	A beaver	
†Eucastor	E. cf. tortus	late Clarendonian - early Hemphillian	Laucomer Member, Johnson Member	A beaver	
†Monosaulax	M. pansus	late Clarendonian	Laucomer Member	A beaver	
†Mylagaulus	M. monodon	early Hemphillian	Johnson Member	A mylagaulid ("horned gopher")	
Otospermophilus	†O. matthewi	early Hemphillian	Johnson Member	A ground squirrel	
†Pliogeomys	P. russelli	late Hemphillian	Johnson Member	A gopher	
†Prodipodomys	P. coquorum	late Hemphillian	Johnson Member	A dipodomyine (kangaroo rat)	

==== Xenarthra ====
Xenarthrans of the Snake Creek Formation
Genus / Taxon	Species	NALMA	Strata	Notes	Images
†Megalonyx	M. curvidens	Hemphillian	Johnson Member	A megalonychid ground sloth.	
†Megalonychidae?		late Clarendonian?	Laucomer Member?	The sole supposed Laucomer Member ground sloth fossil is a navicular bone, which might actually be from the Johnson Member.	

=== Reptiles ===
Reptiles of the Snake Creek Formation
Genus / Taxon	Species	NALMA	Strata	Notes	Images
Testudo	T. sp.	early Clarendonian	Murphy Member	A tortoise	

== See also ==
- List of fossiliferous stratigraphic units in Nebraska
- Paleontology in Nebraska
