= Goliad Formation =

- Stratigraphic range: Clarendonian-Blancan; ~13.6–5.2 Ma
- Type: Formation
- Sub-units: Lapara, Lagarto Creek & Labahia Members
- Underlies: Pleistocene terrace deposits
- Overlies: Fleming Formation
- Thickness: 60–425 m (197–1,394 ft)

Lithology
- Primary: Sandstone, claystone
- Other: Marl, caliche, limestone, conglomerate

Location
- Coordinates: 28.6°N 97.7°W
- Approximate paleocoordinates: 29.0°N 95.3°W
- Region: Bee, Goliad, Hidalgo & Live Oak counties, Texas
- Country: United States
- Extent: Texas coastal plain

Type section
- Named for: Goliad County
- Named by: Plummer
- Year defined: 1932
- Goliad Formation (the United States) Goliad Formation (Texas)

The Goliad Formation (Tg) is a geologic formation in Texas. It preserves fossils dating back to the Serravallian to earliest Pliocene stages (Clarendonian, Hemphillian and earliest Blancan in the NALMA classification) of the Neogene period, including the gomphothere Blancotherium among many other fossil mammals, reptiles, birds and fish.

The formation hosts uranium deposits and forms the Evangeline aquifer underneath the city of Houston.

== Description ==
The Goliad Formation was described by Plummer in 1933, as consisting of three members; the Lapara Sand, overlain by the Lagarto Creek Beds, in turn overlain by the Labahia Beds with outcrop thicknesses ranging from 35 to 200 feet (11 to 61 m). The Goliad Formation comprises claystone, sand, sandstone, marl, caliche, limestone, and conglomerates and reaches in certain areas a thickness of 180 metres (590 ft). The formation overlies the Fleming Formation and dates from the Clarendonian to the earliest Blancan. In the southwest of its range, the formation overlies the Catahoula and Gueydan Formations. The Goliad Formation is recognized regionally across the Texas coastal plain as an interval of dominantly fluvial siliciclastic strata that overlies the Miocene Fleming Formation and underlies Pleistocene terrace deposits. The formation is now interpreted as a basinward-thickening progradational wedge of Middle and Late Miocene age. Stratigraphic thicknesses in outcrop range from 60 to 120 metres (200 to 390 ft), but offshore the interval thickens to as much as 365 to 425 metres (1,198 to 1,394 ft).

Together with the Catahoula, Fleming and Oakville Formation, the Goliad Formation is part of the Gulf Coast aquifer, an extensive artesian aquifer that produces water primarily for irrigation and municipalities. The Evangeline aquifer is hosted by the Goliad Formation underlying the city of Houston. The formation hosts uranium deposits in the South Texas Uranium Province and is mined for caliche in Hidalgo County, Texas.

== Fossil content ==
Tertiary mammal fossils from South Texas were first reported by Dumble (1894) as coming from the Lapara division, later the Lapara Beds (Dumble, 1903).

The following fossils have been reported from the formation:

Group	Taxa	Notes	Images
Mammals	Aelurodon taxoides		
Mammals	Blancotherium buckneri		
Mammals	Calippus martini		
Mammals	Calippus placidus		
Mammals	Calippus regulus		
Mammals	Ceratogaulus rhinocerus		
Mammals	Cormohipparion ingenuum		
Mammals	Cranioceras teres		
Mammals	Dinohippus subvenus		
Mammals	Hipparion tehonense		
Mammals	Hypohippus affine		
Mammals	Hypohippus affinis		
Mammals	Ischyrocyon gidleyi		
Mammals	Leptocyon vafer		
Mammals	Megatylopus primaevus		
Mammals	Neohipparion affine		
Mammals	Nothotylopus camptognathus		
Mammals	Pliohippus pernix		
Mammals	Procamelus grandis		
Mammals	Procamelus occidentalis		
Mammals	Prosthennops xiphidonticus		
Mammals	Protohippus supremus		
Mammals	Protolabis coartatus		
Mammals	Pseudhipparion curtivallum		
Mammals	Pseudoceras skinneri		
Mammals	Ramoceros ramosus		
Mammals	Synthetoceras tricornatus		
Mammals	Teleoceras major		
Mammals	Ustatochoerus medius novomexicanus		
Mammals	Protolabis cf. yavapaiensis		
Mammals	Ustatochoerus cf. medius		
Mammals	Aepycamelus sp.		
Mammals	Amphicyon sp.		
Mammals	Aphelops sp.		
Mammals	Bison sp.		
Mammals	Blastomeryx sp.		
Mammals	Calippus sp.		
Mammals	Glyptodon sp.		
Mammals	Hypohippus sp.		
Mammals	Hippotherium sp.		
Mammals	Hypolagus sp.		
Mammals	Megatylopus sp.		
Mammals	Merychippus sp.		
Mammals	Merychyus sp.		
Mammals	Merycodus sp.		
Mammals	Nannippus sp.		
Mammals	Neohipparion sp.		
Mammals	Pliauchenia sp.		
Mammals	Pliohippus sp.		
Mammals	Procamelus sp.		
Mammals	Prosthennops sp.		
Mammals	Protolabis sp.		
Mammals	Teleoceras sp.		
Mammals	cf. Domninoides sp.		
Mammals	cf. Eucyon sp.		
Mammals	cf. Gomphotherium sp.		
Mammals	Amphicyoninae indet.		
Mammals	Merycodontinae indet.		
Mammals	Protoceratinae indet.		
Mammals	Tayassuinae indet.		
Mammals	Antilocapridae indet.		
Mammals	Canidae indet.		
Mammals	Equini indet.		
Mammals	Palaeomerycidae indet.		
Mammals	Protoceratidae indet.		
Mammals	Rhinocerotidae indet.		
Mammals	Rodentia indet.		
Mammals	Ruminantia indet.		
Mammals	cf. Mustelidae indet.		
Birds	cf. Anserinae indet.		
Birds	Aves indet.		
Reptiles	Alligator cf. mississippiensis		
Reptiles	Apalone sp.		
Reptiles	Hesperotestudo sp.		
Reptiles	Testudo sp.		
Reptiles	Trionyx sp.		
Reptiles	cf. Gopherus sp.		
Reptiles	cf. Mycteria sp.		
Reptiles	cf. Terrapene sp.		
Reptiles	cf. Trachemys sp.		
Reptiles	Emydidae indet.		
Fish	Pylodictis olivaris		
Fish	Ictalurus cf. lambda		
Fish	Ameiurus sp.		
Fish	Lepisosteus sp.		

== See also ==
- List of fossiliferous stratigraphic units in Texas
- Paleontology in Texas
