= Silverdale =

Silverdale may refer to:

== Places ==
Australia

- Silverdale, New South Wales
- Silverdale, Queensland

Canada

- Silverdale, British Columbia

India

- Silverdale, Coonoor

New Zealand

- Silverdale, Auckland
- Silverdale, Hamilton

United Kingdom

- Silverdale, Lancashire
- Silverdale, Nottingham
- Silverdale, North Yorkshire, a dale
- Silverdale, Staffordshire

United States

- Silverdale, Indiana
- Silverdale, Kansas
- Silverdale Township, Cowley County, Kansas
- Silverdale, Minnesota
- Silverdale, Pennsylvania
- Silverdale, Washington

== Other ==
- Silverdale (limestone), commercial building and sculpture stone quarried from the Fort Riley Limestone, Kansas, USA
- Silverdale Formation, a Miocene geologic unit in North Carolina, USA
- Silverdale Detention Center, Tennessee, USA
- Silverdale School, Sheffield, United Kingdom
