= Ogallala Formation =

Geologic formation in the western United States

- Stratigraphic range: Miocene–Early Pliocene
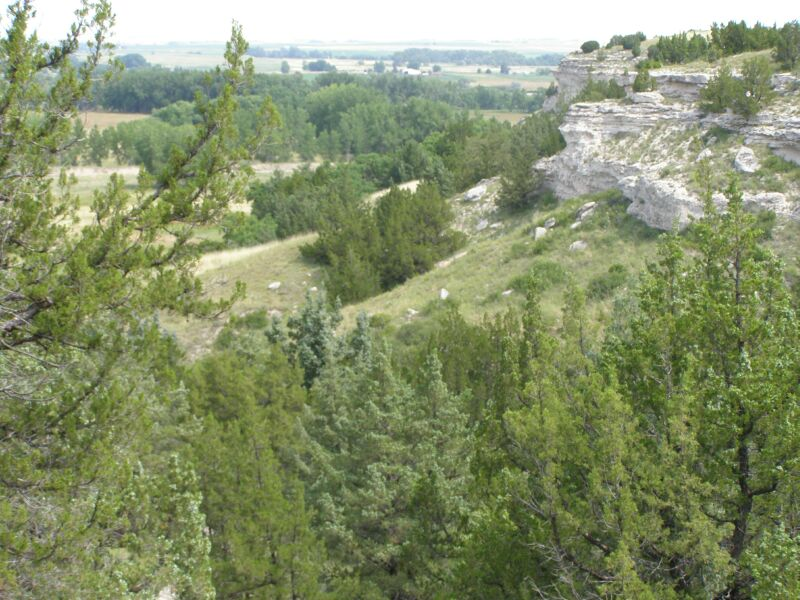
- Common appearance of the "caprock" caliche beds from the middle of the Ogallala at Ash Hollow, Nebraska
- Type: Formation / Group
- Sub-units: see text
- Underlies: Pleistocene loess
- Overlies: Weathered Cretaceous, Jurassic, Triassic, and Permian terrains

Lithology
- Primary: sand, gravel, caliche cementation
- Other: chert, agate, opaline sandstone, marl, limestone, ash

Location
- Region: High Plains
- Country: United States

Type section
- Named for: Ogallala, Nebraska

The Ogallala Formation is a Miocene to early Pliocene geologic formation in the central High Plains of the western United States and the location of the Ogallala Aquifer. In Nebraska and South Dakota it is also classified as the Ogallala Group. Notably, it records the North American Land Mammal Ages (NALMAs) Hemphillian, Clarendonian, and Barstovian. It also includes an excellent record of grass seeds and other plant seeds, which can be used for biostratigraphic dating within the formation. The Ogallala Formation outcrops of Lake Meredith National Recreation Area preserve fish fossils. Similar specimens from the same unit are found at Alibates Flint Quarries National Monument in Texas.

== Development ==
At the beginning of the Rocky Mountains uplift, the final floor of the Western Interior Seaway was elevated several thousand feet (thousands of meters) above sea level. The pattern of erosion of material from the northeast into the midcontinent was largely reversed from the previous drainage patterns of the Cretaceous and earlier periods so that material eroded from the Rocky Mountains was carried eastward on to expansive, geologically weathered plains. This material included quartz and feldspar from Precambrian granite, but also residue from the uplifted shale, limestone, and sandstone accumulated from the Paleozoic and Mesozoic periods, as well as igneous rock from Cenozoic volcanism.

Many rivers carried this material from the mountains to the east. What each river carried from different parts of the mountains varied, changing also as the geography of the Rocky Mountains evolved.

Owing to the low amount of sloping, vast quantities of sand and gravel were dumped on the plains in broad and overlapping alluvial fans rather than being carried into the Mississippi River.

Over this time, many volcanic ash falls occurred and have been identified to their source, including several from the Yellowstone Supervolcano and two from the Jemez Caldera.

== Lithostratigraphy ==
From bottom to top, the Ogallala was deposited as overlapping alluvial fans of sand and gravel, displaying bedding resulting from river flows and flooding. Much of this material remained unconsolidated; however, significant modification occurred as the material deepened, particularly with the cementation of the sand and gravel with calcium carbonate and silica.

The top of the Ogallala is defined by a thick cap rock of hard limestone or caliche, broadly called "algal limestone". Patterns of thin lines in the "limestone" suggested algal origin to frontier geologists (calcite and silica deposited within mats of algae under a shallow lake). However, the material is determined to be mostly caliche that formed after deposition of the sand and gravel from the mountain rivers was sharply reduced and the climate became arid or semiarid. This extensive and resistant material established the broad flat expanses of the High Plains. Most of the material that overlies this bed is wind-blown Pleistocene loess, while the Blanco Formation overlies the Ogallala in Texas and southwestern Kansas. Much of the underlying sand and gravel is unconsolidated or poorly consolidated such that it easily erodes away, leaving in western Kansas, Nebraska, and Texas a range of dramatic high bluffs that define the boundary of a "high plain".

The lowest, oldest deposits filled in the shallow valleys of the weathered rocks that were exposed at that time, which ranged in age from Cretaceous in Nebraska and Kansas to Permian in Texas. As the rivers built up the alluvial fans, subsurface water circulation varied, resulting in localized formation of caliche, and shallow lakes formed between natural levees, which deposited limestone. These consolidated lenses, distributed in within the middle portion, do not represent any particular horizon; but do cap intermediate bluffs below valley rims. Because of their bluff-forming nature and resemblance to concrete or mortar, these lenses are described as "caprock" or "mortar beds". Various ash falls were locally deposited, supplying silica for the formation of agate and chert in the upper portion and opal in the lowest portion.

Other than the lower opaline sandstone zone and the "Algal limestone", the Ogallala has no persistent lithological marker beds beyond the stated generalities of local chert beds in the upper zone and local caliche "mortar bed" lenses in the middle zone. It may be the case that consolidation of the caliche of the "Algal limestone" occurred broadly at the same time but in whatever material was at the local surface after deposition of the sand and gravel ceased. And, while the "Algal limestone" is a marker bed, it does not establish correlation of the specific beds in which the caliche formed.

== Biostratigraphy ==
Faced with particularly rich collections of terrestrial Neogene vertebrate fossils, Nebraska geologists recognized the distinct North American land mammal ages (NALMA) within the Ogallala; Clarendonian, Hemphillian, and Blancan sufficient to attempt definitions of formations on a biostratigraphic basis. The Ogallala's rich grass seed record was also used to develop biostratigraphic successions within the unit. Unfortunately, no correlation with any consistent rock bedding can be established over the Ogallala's range.

These Nebraskan biostratigraphic classifications elevated the Ogallala to group status with three members Kimball (youngest), Ash Hollow, and Valentine (oldest). Kansas geologists attempted to carry these classifications into the state; but, the state has since abandoned the three divisions. Like the remainder of High Plains states, Kansas considers the Ogallala to be a formation. However, it is convenient to informally divide the Ogallala into the three general zones with these names:

- Kimball - the upper zone with the "Algal limestone", agate, and chert beds
- Ash Hollow - the broad middle zone with the additional caprock "mortar beds" (middle Clarendonian - late Hemphillian)
- Valentine - the lowest zone with the opaline sandstone (late Barstovian - early Clarendonian)

Other subunits of the Ogallala Group found in northwest Nebraska include:

- Snake Creek Formation (Sioux County; Clarendonian - Hemphillian)
- Patton Creek Beds (Sheridan County)
- Wolf Creek Beds (Dawes and Sheridan counties)
- Olcott Formation / Lower Snake Creek Fauna (Sioux County; early Barstovian)
- Sand Canyon Beds (Dawes and Sheridan counties; early Barstovian)
- Sheep Creek Formation (Sioux County, late Hemingfordian)
- Box Butte Formation (late Hemingfordian)
- Runningwater Formation (early Hemingfordian)

== Gallery ==
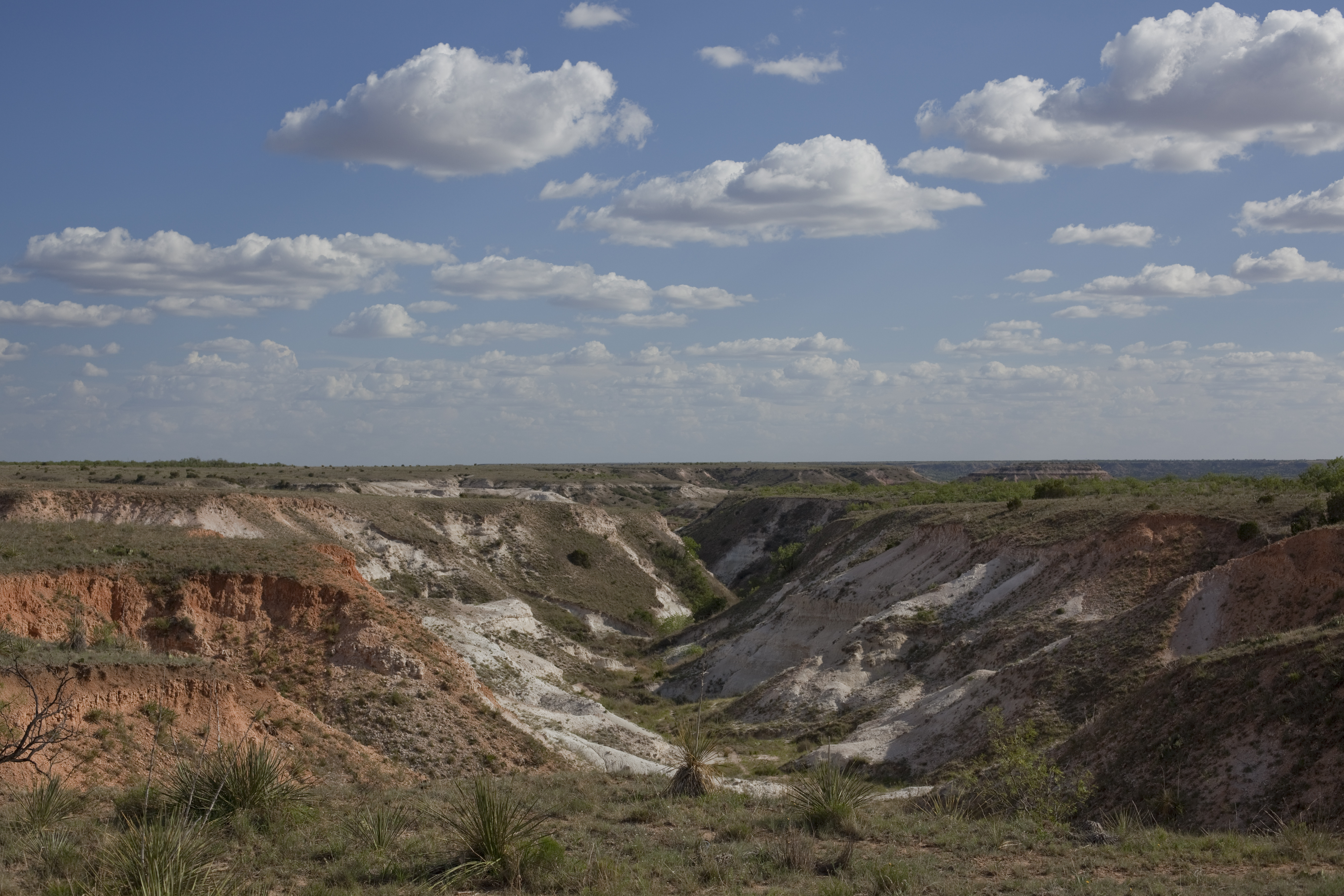
East side of Blanco Canyon, TX, showing the locally red-colored Ogallala Formation and the bright white color of the Blanco Formation.

== See also ==
- List of fossiliferous stratigraphic units in Nebraska
- Paleontology in Nebraska
- Blanco Canyon
