= Fort Riley Limestone =

- Stratigraphic range: Asselian (Gearyan stage)
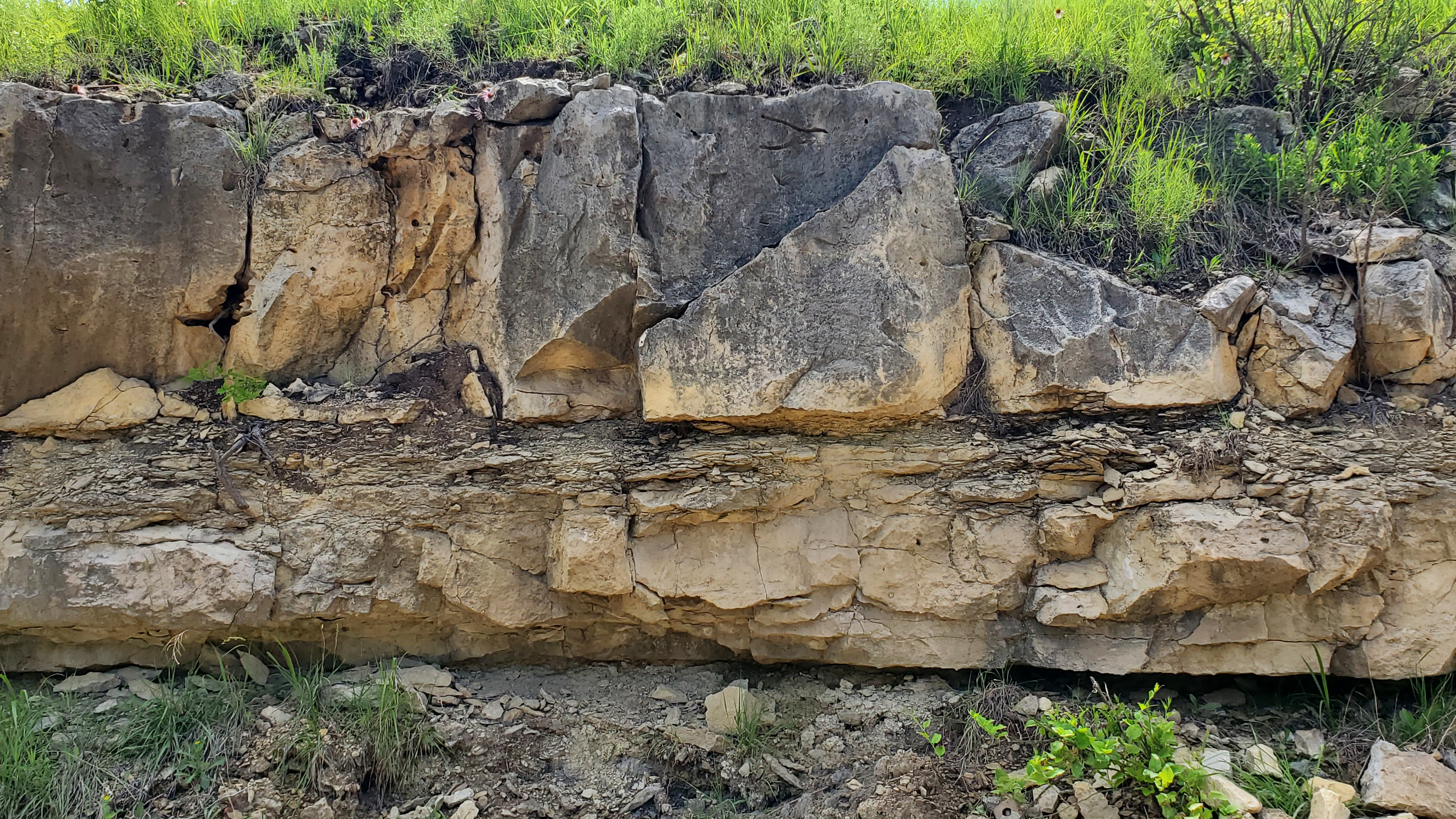
- Fort Riley Limestone, J Hill Road, Geary County, Kansas, near Fort Riley
- Type: Member
- Unit of: Barneston Limestone
- Underlies: Holmesville Shale member of the Doyle Shale formation
- Overlies: Oketo Shale member of the Barneston Limestone formation

Lithology
- Primary: Limestone

Location
- Region: Permian Midcontinent Seaway
- Country: United States

Type section
- Named for: Fort Riley, Kansas

The Fort Riley Limestone is a Kansas Permian stratigraphic unit of member rank and historic building stone, sold commercially as fine-grained Silverdale, having at one time been quarried at Silverdale, Kansas. This limestone outcrops in east-central Kansas, extending into northeast-central Oklahoma and southeastern Nebraska, in the Midwestern United States. Its conspicuous "rim rock" marker horizon outcrop caps the bluffs overlooking the original buildings of Fort Riley, as well as the Marshall Army Airfield opposite the Kansas River.

== See also ==
- List of fossiliferous stratigraphic units in Kansas
- List of fossiliferous stratigraphic units in Nebraska
- List of fossiliferous stratigraphic units in Oklahoma
- Paleontology in Kansas
- Paleontology in Nebraska
- Paleontology in Oklahoma
