= Stanton Formation =

Geologic formation in the United States

- Stratigraphic range: Late Pennsylvanian
- Type: Formation
- Unit of: Lansing Group
- Sub-units: Captain Creek Limestone, Eudora Shale, Rock Lake Shale, Stoner Limestone, Tyro Oolite
- Underlies: Weston Shale Member of the Stranger Formation
- Overlies: Vilas Shale

Lithology
- Primary: Limestone, shale
- Other: Mudstone

Location
- Coordinates: 38.3°N 95.3°W
- Approximate paleocoordinates: 3.6°S 28.5°W
- Region: Nebraska, Iowa, Missouri & Kansas
- Country: United States

Type section
- Named for: Stanton
- Stanton Formation (the United States) Stanton Formation (Kansas)

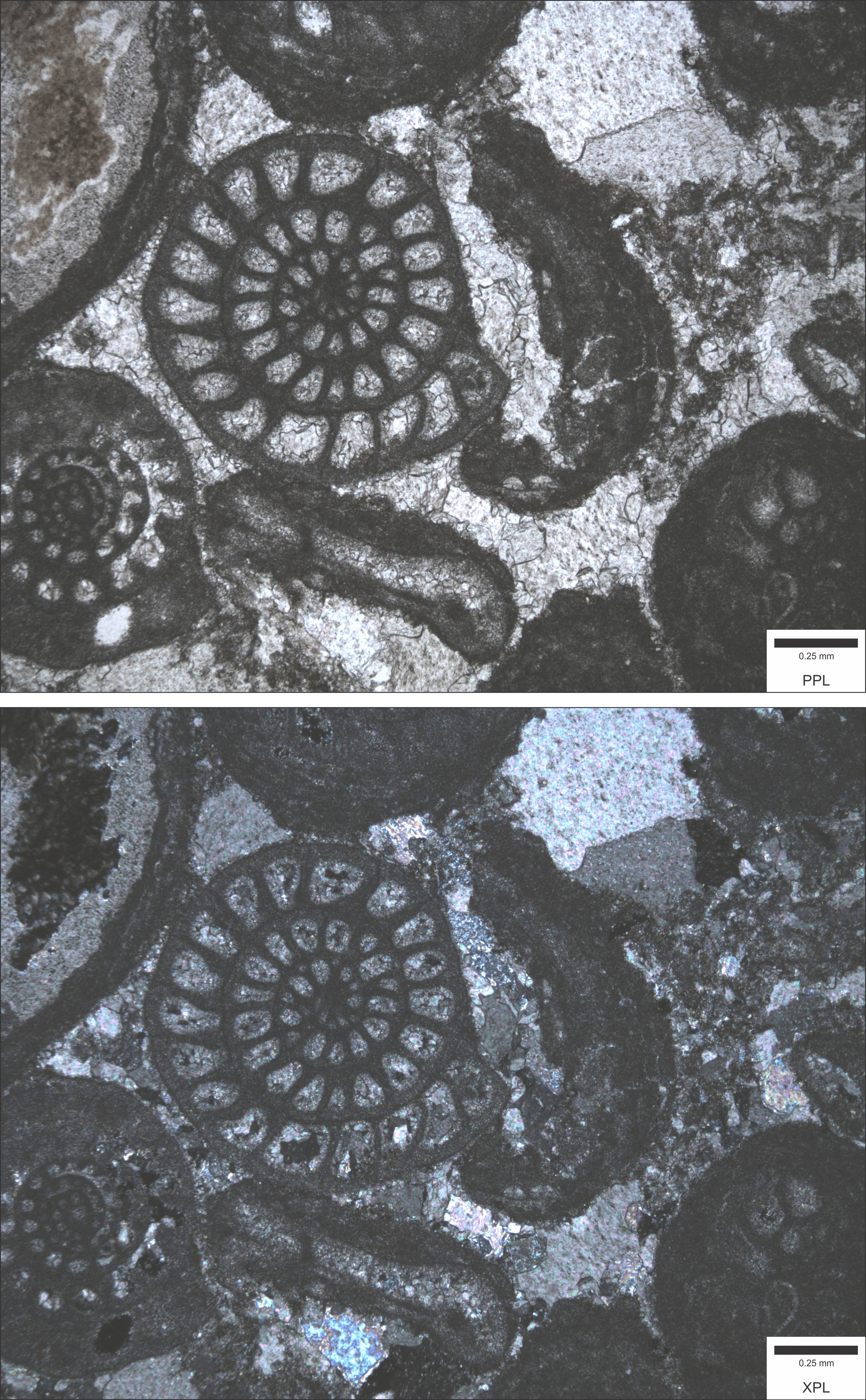
Fossils from the Stanton Formation

The Stanton Formation is a geologic formation of limestone in Iowa, Nebraska, Missouri and Kansas. It preserves fossils dating back to the Carboniferous period. It is in the Upper Pennsylvanian series, forming the top of the Lansing Group.

== Location ==
The Stanton Formation overlies and underlies the Vilas Shale and the Weston Shale Member of the Stranger Formation respectively. The Stanton Limestone outcrop is found between the Platte River Valley of eastern Nebraska to the Oklahoma border, traversing through Iowa, Missouri and eastern Kansas.

== See also ==
- List of fossiliferous stratigraphic units in Iowa
- List of fossiliferous stratigraphic units in Kansas
- List of fossiliferous stratigraphic units in Missouri
- List of fossiliferous stratigraphic units in Nebraska
- Paleontology in Iowa
- Paleontology in Kansas
- Paleontology in Missouri
- Paleontology in Nebraska
