= List of fossiliferous stratigraphic units in Nebraska =

This article contains a list of fossil-bearing stratigraphic units in the state of Nebraska, U.S.

== Sites ==
Group or Formation	Period	Notes
Admire Group/Falls City	Carboniferous	
Admire Group/Falls City Limestone	Carboniferous	
Admire Group/Janesville Shale	Carboniferous	
Admire Group/Onaga Shale	Carboniferous	
Admire Group/Towle Shale	Carboniferous	
Arikaree Group	Paleogene	
Arikaree Group/Coffee Mill Butte Beds	Paleogene	
Arikaree Group/Reunion Creek Beds	Paleogene	
Arikaree Group/Wildcat Hills Beds	Paleogene	
Ash Hollow Formation	Neogene	
Barneston Formation	Permian	
Box Butte Formation	Neogene	
Bronson Group/Dennis Formation	Carboniferous	
Brown Siltstone Beds	Cretaceous	
Brule Formation	Paleogene	
Carlise Shale	Cretaceous	
Chadron Formation	Paleogene	
Chase Formation	Carboniferous	
Council Grove Group/Beattie Formation	Permian	
Council Grove Group/Foraker Limestone	Carboniferous	
Dakota Formation	Cretaceous	
Fall River Sandstone	Cretaceous	
Foraker Formation	Carboniferous	
Fort Riley Formation	Permian	
Gering Formation	Paleogene	
Greenhorn Formation	Cretaceous	
Harrison Formation	Neogene	
Huntsman Shale	Cretaceous	
J Sandstone	Cretaceous	
Kansas City Group/Dennis Formation	Carboniferous	
Kansas City Group/Swope Formation	Carboniferous	
Kansas City Group/Swope Limestone	Carboniferous	
Kansas City Group/Westerville Formation	Carboniferous	
Kanwaka Formation	Carboniferous	
Kereford Formation	Carboniferous	
Lansing Group	Carboniferous	
Lansing Group/Plattsburg Formation	Carboniferous	
Lansing Group/Stanton Formation	Carboniferous	
Lavaca Flats Beds	Cretaceous	
Long Pine Formation	Neogene	
Loveland Loess		
Lower Harrison Beds		
Marmaton Group/Altamont Limestone	Carboniferous	
Marsland Formation	Neogene	
Monroe Creek Formation	Paleogene	
Montana Group/Pierre Shale	Cretaceous	
Neva Formation	Permian	
Niobrara Formation	Cretaceous	
Ogallala Formation	Neogene	
Ogallala Group/Valentine Formation	Neogene	
Olcott Formation	Neogene	
Onaga Formation	Carboniferous	
Oread Formation	Carboniferous	
Oreodon Beds	Paleogene	
Pierre Shale	Cretaceous	
Runningwater Formation	Neogene	
Sand Canyon Formation	Neogene	
Sappa Formation	Cretaceous	
Scotch Grove Formation	Silurian	
Severy Shale	Carboniferous	
Shawnee Group	Carboniferous	
Shawnee Group/Deer Creek Formation	Carboniferous	
Shawnee Group/Kanwaka Formation	Carboniferous	
Shawnee Group/Lecompton Formation	Carboniferous	
Shawnee Group/Oread Formation	Carboniferous	
Sheep Creek Formation	Neogene	
Skull Creek Shale	Cretaceous	
Snake Creek Formation	Neogene	
Stanton Formation	Carboniferous	
Titanotherium Beds	Paleogene	
Upper Harrison Beds		
Valentine Formation	Neogene	
Wabaunsee Group/Severy Shale	Carboniferous	
Wabaunsee Group/Stotler Formation	Carboniferous	
Wabaunsee Group/Wood Siding Formation	Carboniferous	
White River Group/Brule Formation	Paleogene	
White River Group/Chadron Formation	Paleogene	
Winfield Formation	Permian	

== See also ==
- Paleontology in Nebraska
