= Matfield Shale =

Geologic formation in Kansas, United States

Matfield Formation Matfield Shale
- Stratigraphic range: Permian
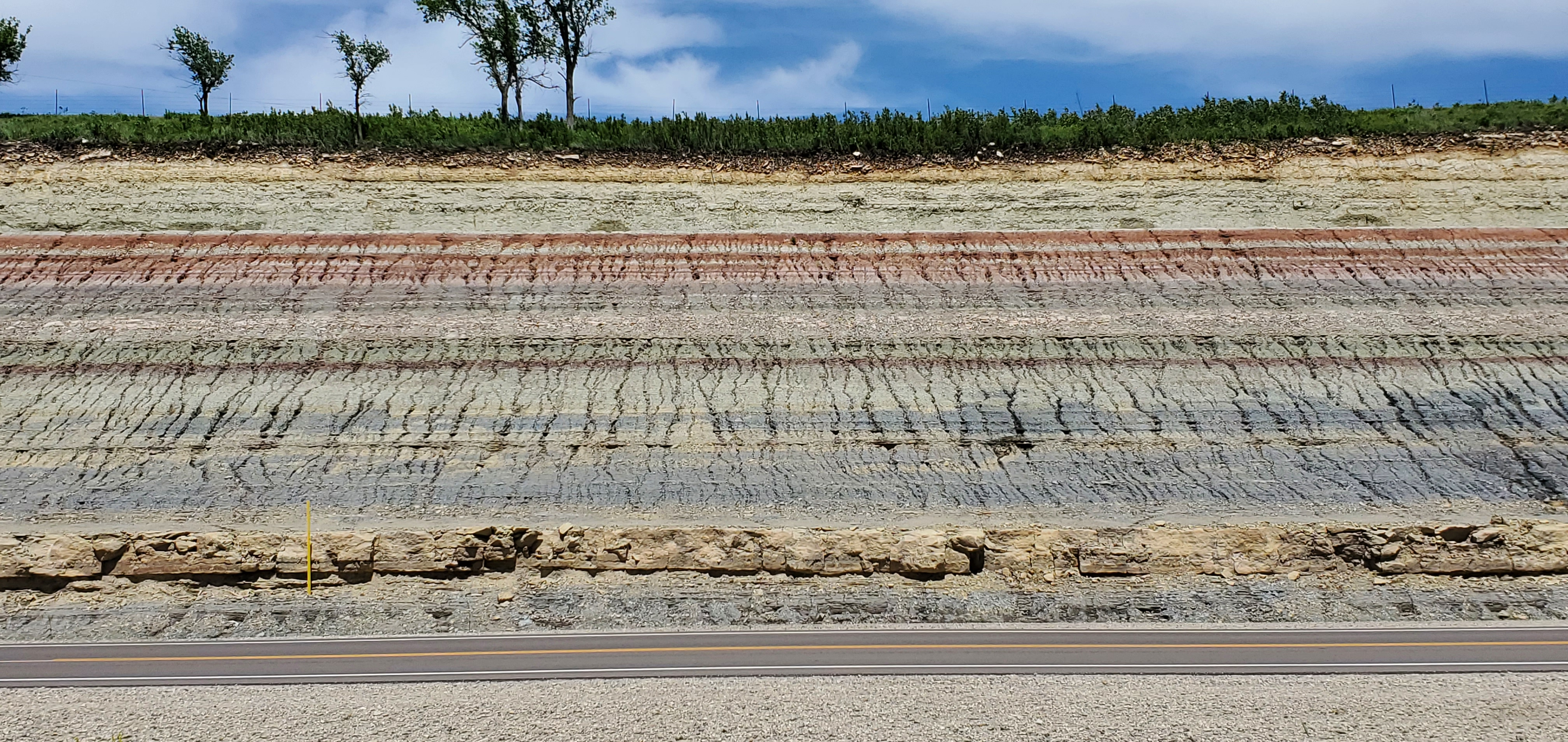
- Matfield Shale: Blue Springs Shale member with the Kinney Limestone member jutting out above the pavement with a bit of Wymore Shale showing below that. Geary County, Kansas, 2023-24 fresh road cut, Highway K-177, 5 miles South of Interstate 70
- Type: Formation
- Unit of: Chase Group
- Sub-units: Blue Springs Shale; Kinney Limestone; Wymore Shale
- Underlies: Flinty Florence Limestone member of the Barneston Formation
- Overlies: Flinty Wreford Limestone

Lithology
- Primary: Shale and mudstone
- Other: Limestone

Location
- Region: Kansas
- Country: United States

Type section
- Named for: Matfield Township, Chase County, Kansas
- Named by: Prosser, C.S.
- Year defined: 1902

The Matfield Shale is a geologic formation in Kansas from the Permian period. The unit is recognizable in several road cuts in the Flint Hills, especially in the vicinity of the Kansas River, by 4 or 5 beds of red/maroon shale.

== See also ==
- List of fossiliferous stratigraphic units in Kansas
- Paleontology in Kansas
