= Westerville Formation =

Geologic fossil formation in Nebraska, US

- Stratigraphic range: Carboniferous
- Type: Formation

Location
- Region: Nebraska
- Country: United States

The Westerville Formation is a geologic formation in Nebraska. It preserves fossils dating back to the Carboniferous period.

== See also ==
- List of fossiliferous stratigraphic units in Nebraska
- Paleontology in Nebraska
