= Gering Formation =

Geologic formation in Nebraska, United States

- Stratigraphic range: Paleogene
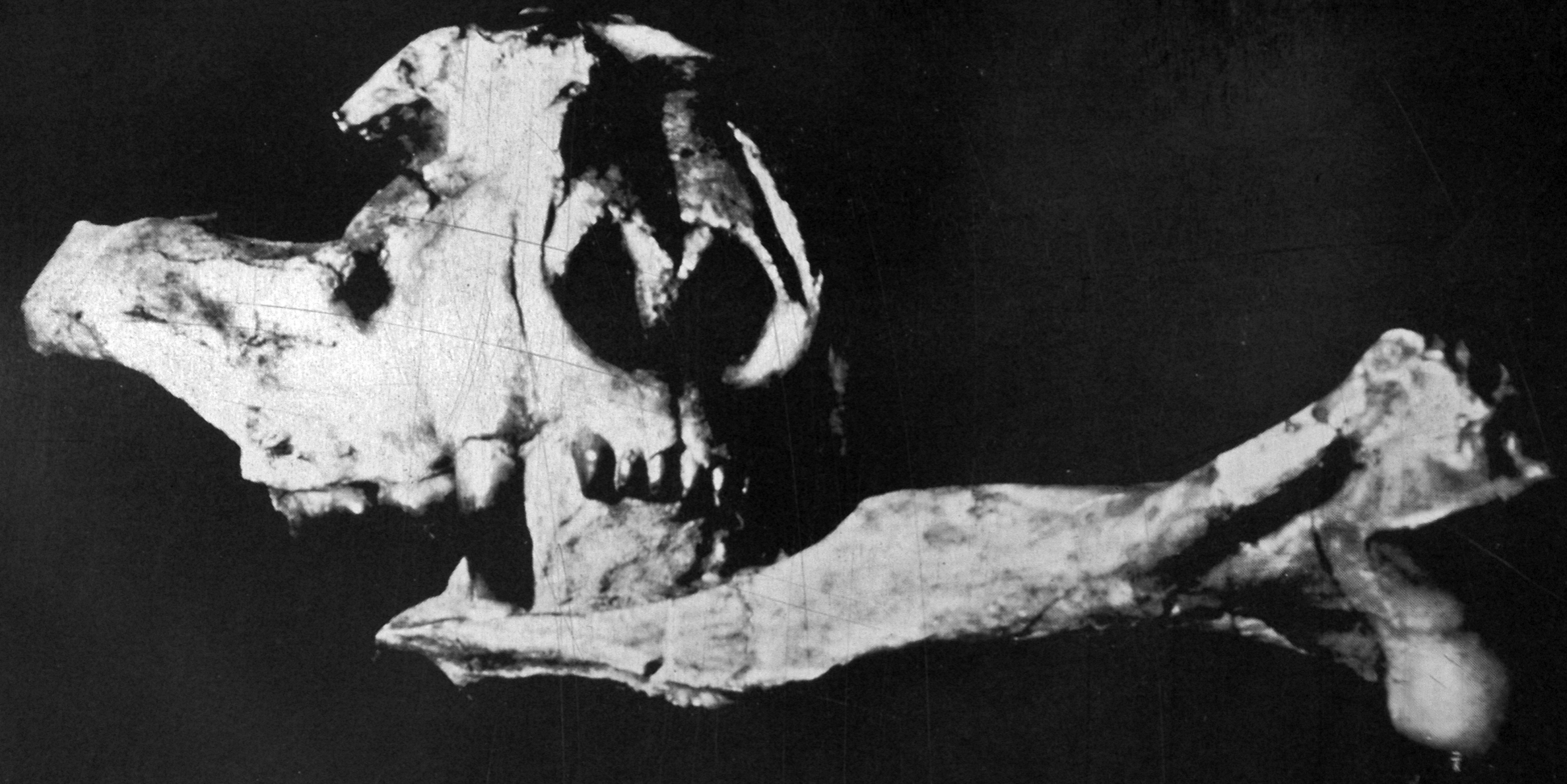
- Fossils from the Gering Formation (Oligocene; Nebraska)
- Type: Group

Location
- Region: Nebraska
- Country: United States

The Gering Formation is a geologic group in Nebraska. It preserves fossils dating back to the Paleogene period. The formation is made of layers of very fine-grained, volcaniclastic sandstone and thin, horizontally stratified pale-to-gray brown sandstone, as well as sand crystals and ash beds.

== See also ==
- List of fossiliferous stratigraphic units in Nebraska
- Paleontology in Nebraska
