= Onaga =

Onaga may refer to:

- Onaga (Mortal Kombat), a Mortal Kombat character
- Onaga, Kansas, a city in the United States
- Onaga, one of the Japanese names, used in Hawaii, for the fish Etelis coruscans also known as ʻulaʻula koaʻe or longtail red snapper
- Callistus Valentine Onaga (born 1958), Roman Catholic bishop
- Takeshi Onaga (1950–2018), Governor of Okinawa, Japan
- Hijiri Onaga (born 1995), Japanese football player
- Miki Onaga (born 1997), Japanese racing driver
- Onaga Shale, a fossil-bearing geologic formation in Onaga, Nebraska
