= Stotler Formation =

Geologic formation in Nebraska, United States

- Stratigraphic range: Carboniferous
- Type: Formation

Location
- Region: Nebraska
- Country: United States

The Stotler Formation is a geological formation in Nebraska. It preserves fossils dating back to the Carboniferous period.

== See also ==
- List of fossiliferous stratigraphic units in Nebraska
- Paleontology in Nebraska
- Paleontology
