= Long Pine (disambiguation) =

Long Pine or Long Pines may refer to:

- Long Pine, Nebraska, a city in Nebraska
- Long Pine Creek, a stream in Nebraska
- Long Pine Formation, a geologic formation in Nebraska
- Long Pine National Forest, a forest in Montana
- Long Pines, a mountain range in Montana
