= Sand Canyon Formation =

Geologic formation in Nebraska, United States

- Stratigraphic range: Neogene
- Type: Formation

Location
- Region: Nebraska
- Country: United States

The Sand Canyon Formation is a geologic formation in Nebraska. It preserves fossils dating back to the Neogene period.

== See also ==
- List of fossiliferous stratigraphic units in Nebraska
- Paleontology in Nebraska
