= Marsland Formation =

Geologic formation in Nebraska, United States

- Stratigraphic range: Neogene
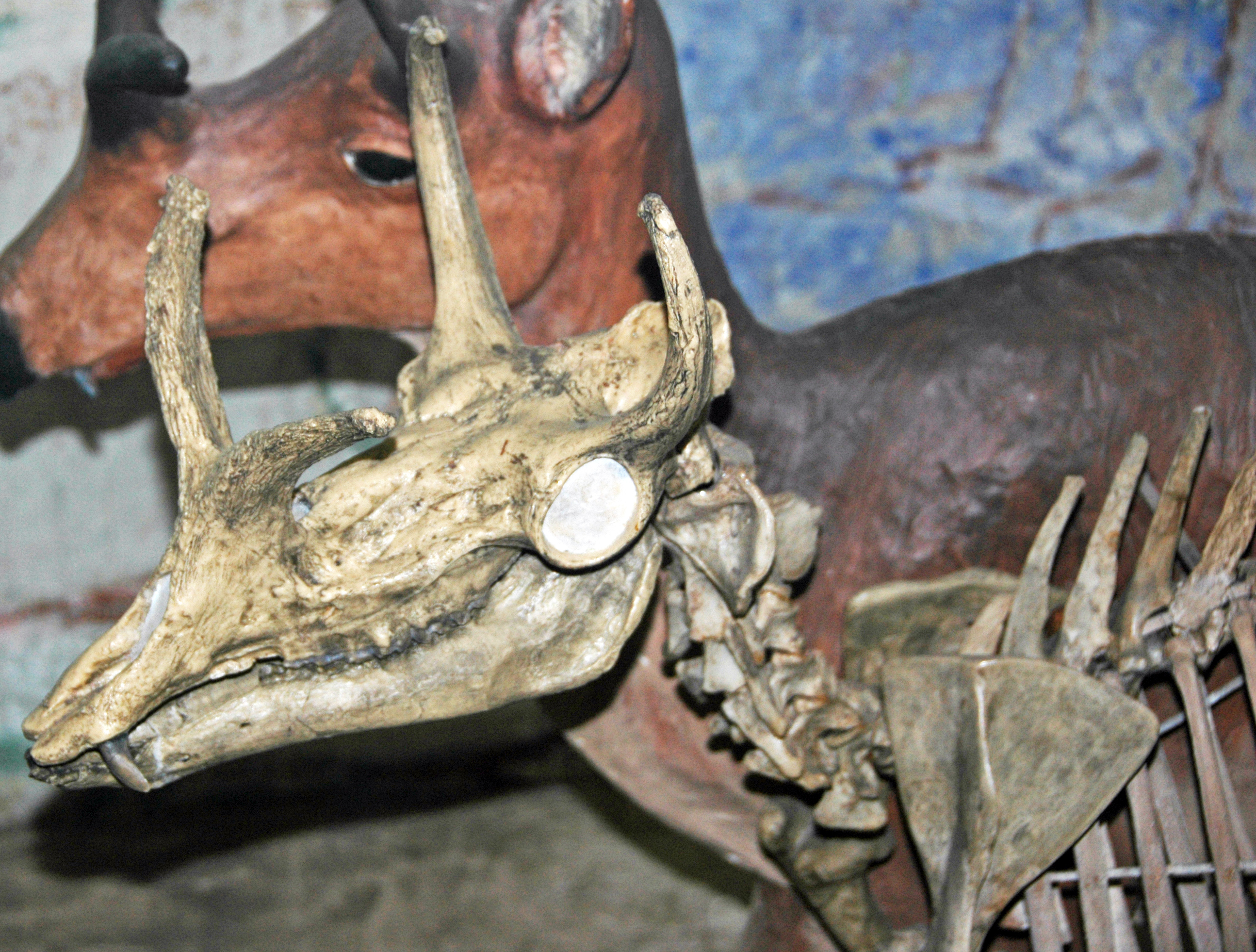
- Fossil mammal from the Marsland Formation (Middle Miocene; Nebraska)
- Type: Geological formation

Location
- Region: Nebraska
- Country: United States

Marsland Formation is a geologic formation in Nebraska preserving fossils dating back to the Neogene period.

== Fossil content ==
Color key: Taxon / Reclassified taxon / Taxon falsely reported as present / Dubious taxon or junior synonym / Ichnotaxon / Ootaxon / Morphotaxon	Notes; Uncertain or tentative taxa are in small text; ~~crossed out~~ taxa are discredited.

=== Mammals ===
==== Ungulates ====
Ungulates reported from the Marsland Formation
Genus	Species	Presence	Material	Notes	Images
Mediochoerus	M. johnsoni	Dawes County, Nebraska (upper part of the formation).	A skull	A merycoidodontid.	
Menoceras	M. barbouri	Morrill & Box Butte counties, Nebraska.	Skulls.	A rhinoceros.	
Menoceras	M. falkenbachi	Morrill County, Nebraska (lower part of the formation).	Skulls.	Synonymized with M. barbouri.	
Menoceras	M. marslandensis	Box Butte County, Nebraska (upper part of the formation).	Skulls.	Synonymized with M. barbouri.	

=== Reptiles ===
==== Testudines ====
Testudines reported from the Marsland Formation
Genus	Species	Presence	Material	Notes	Images
Macroclemys	M. schmidti	Box Butte County, Nebraska.	A fragmentary juvenile skull & an adult skull.	A snapping turtle.	

== See also ==
- List of fossiliferous stratigraphic units in Nebraska
- Paleontology in Nebraska
