= Dinogale =

Dinogale Temporal range: Early Miocene (late Hemingfordian)

Scientific classification
- Kingdom: Animalia
- Phylum: Chordata
- Class: Mammalia
- Order: Carnivora
- Family: Mustelidae
- Genus: †Dinogale; Cook & MacDonald, 1962
- Species: †D. siouxensis

Binomial name
- †Dinogale siouxensis Cook & MacDonald, 1962

Extinct genus of mustelid

Dinogale is an extinct genus of mustelid from the Early Miocene of Nebraska. It contains a single species, Dinogale siouxensis, from the lower Sheep Creek Formation (late Hemingfordian NALMA). The only fossil is a partial lower jaw, preserving a canine, four premolars, a molar, and empty sockets for a second molar. It was moderately large for an early mustelid, comparable to a tayra or marten. If this comparison reflects affinities, then Dinogale would be the oldest known gulonine mustelid, though it is more likely to be a stem-group mustelid instead.
