= Onaga Shale =

Geologic formation

- Stratigraphic range: Carboniferous
- Type: Formation
- Sub-units: Aspinwall Limestone

Location
- Region: Nebraska, Kansas
- Country: United States

The Onaga Shale is a geologic formation in Nebraska. It preserves fossils dating back to the Carboniferous period.

== See also ==
- List of fossiliferous stratigraphic units in Nebraska
- Paleontology in Nebraska
