= Long Pine Formation =

- Stratigraphic range: 4.75–1.8 Ma
- Type: Geologic formation
- Underlies: Duffy Formation
- Overlies: Keim Formation or Ash Hollow Formation

Location
- Region: Nebraska
- Country: United States

Type section
- Named for: Long Pine Creek
- Named by: Skinner and Hibbard
- Year defined: 1972
- Coordinates: 42.7°N 100.0°W
- Approximate paleocoordinates: 42.8°N 99.3°W
- Country: USA

The Long Pine Formation is a geologic formation in Nebraska. It preserves fossils.

== See also ==
- List of fossiliferous stratigraphic units in Nebraska
- Paleontology in Nebraska
