= Sheep Creek Formation =

Geologic formation in Nebraska, United States

- Stratigraphic range: Neogene
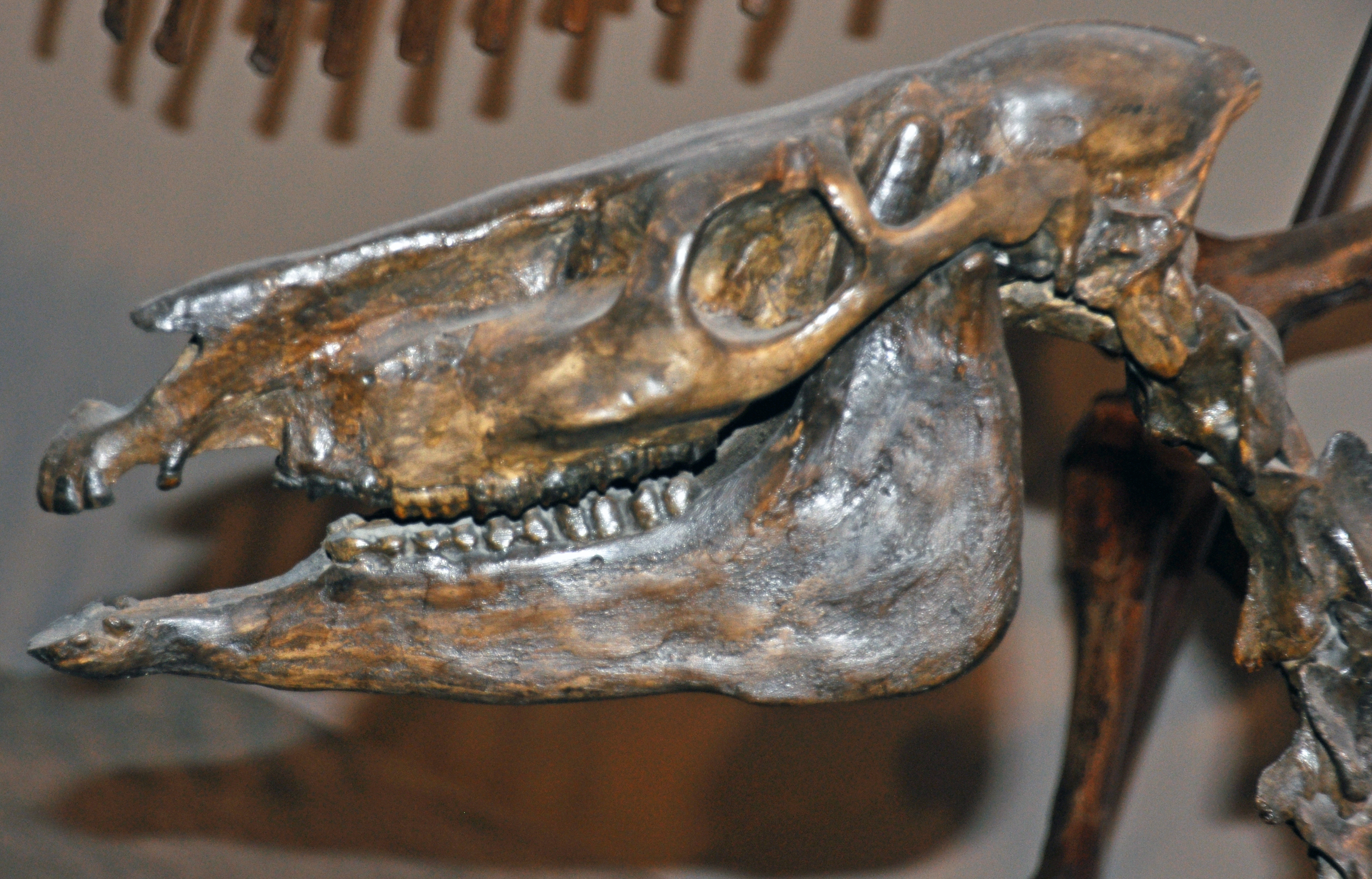
- Fossil horse head from the Sheep Creek Formation (Miocene; Nebraska)
- Type: Formation

Location
- Region: Nebraska
- Country: United States

The Sheep Creek Formation is a geologic formation in Nebraska. It preserves fossils dating back to the Neogene period.

== List of Fossil Species ==
=== Birds ===
==== Accipitriformes ====
Genus	Species	Family	Stratigraphic Position	Material	Notes	Images
Neophrontops	N. vetustus	Accipitridae	middle			
Urubitinga	U. enecta	Accipitridae	middle			

==== Charadriiformes ====
Genus	Species	Family	Stratigraphic Position	Material	Notes	Images
Burhinus	B. lucorum	Burhinidae	middle			

==== Falconiformes ====
Genus	Species	Family	Stratigraphic Position	Material	Notes	Images
Pediohierax	P. ramenta	Falconidae	middle			

==== Gruiformes ====
Genus	Species	Family	Stratigraphic Position	Material	Notes	Images
Aramornis	A. longurio	Aramidae	middle			

==== Psittaciformes ====
Genus	Species	Family	Stratigraphic Position	Material	Notes	Images
Conuropsis	C. fratercula	Psittacidae	middle			

=== Mammals ===
==== Artiodactyls ====
Genus	Species	Family	Stratigraphic Position	Material	Notes	Images
Merycodus	M. minor	Antilocapridae	middle			
Merycodus	M. sabulonis	Antilocapridae	lower			
Paracosoryx	P. wilsoni	Antilocapridae	lower			
Homocamelus	H. caninus	Camelidae				
Honeycamelus	H. priscus	Camelidae		Skull and postcrania	Close to the divergence of Lamini and Camelini	
Paramiolabis	P. tenuis	Camelidae	middle	Skulls and Jaws		
Protolabis	P. saxeus	Camelidae	middle	Skulls		
Pseudoparablastomeryx	P. scotti	Hypertragulidae	middle			
Brachycrus	B. buwaldi	Merycoidodontidae	middlelower			
Brachycrus	B. wilsoni	Merycoidodontidae	lower			
Merychyus	M. relictus	Merycoidodontidae	middlelower			
Blastomeryx	B. gemmifer	Moschidae	middlelower			
Blastomeryx	B. antilopinus	Moschidae	middlelower			
Bouromeryx	B. americanus	Palaeomerycidae	middlelower			
Bouromeryx	B. submilleri	Palaeomerycidae	lower			
Sinclairomeryx	S. riparius	Palaeomerycidae	middlelower			
Lambdoceras	L. sp	Protoceratidae	middle			
Hesperhys	H. vagrans	Tayassuidae	middle			
Platygonus	P. pollenae	Tayassuidae	middle			
Prosthennops	P. xiphodonticus	Tayassuidae	middle			

==== Carnivorans ====
Genus	Species	Family	Stratigraphic Position	Material	Notes	Images
Amphicyon	A. frendens	Amphicyonidae	middle			
Cynelos	C. idoneus	Amphicyonidae	middle			
Pliocyon	P. sp	Amphicyonidae	middle			
Cynarctoides	C. acridens	Canidae	middlelower			
Leptocyon	L. leidyi	Canidae	middlelower			
Osbornodon	O. fricki	Canidae	middlelower			
Protomarctus	P. optatus	Canidae	middlelower			
Pseudaelurus	P. intrepidus	Felidae	middle			
Pseudaelurus	P. validus	Felidae	middlelower			
Brachypsalis	B. matutinus	Mustelidae	middle			
Dinogale	D. siouxensis	Mustelidae	middle			
Mionictis	M. letifer	Mustelidae	middle			

==== Perissodactyla ====
Genus	Species	Family	Stratigraphic Position	Material	Notes	Images
Tylocephalonyx	T. skinneri	Chalicotheridae	middlelower			
Acritohippus	A. tertius	Equidae	middlelower			
Archaeohippus	A. penultimus	Equidae	middlelower			
Merychippus	M. primus	Equidae	middlelower			
Aphelops	A. megalodum	Rhinocerotidae	middlelower			
Peraceras	P. profectum	Rhinocerotidae	middle			
Teleoceras	T. americanum	Rhinocerotidae	middlelower			

==== Eulipotyphla ====
Genus	Species	Family	Stratigraphic Position	Material	Notes	Images
Scalopoides	S. isodens	Talpidae				
Mesoscalops	M. scopelotemos	Proscalopidae				
Brachyerix	B. macrotis	Erinaceidae	lower			

==== Chiroptera ====
Genus	Species	Family	Stratigraphic Position	Material	Notes	Images
Myotis	M. sp	Vespertilionidae				

==== Lagomorpha ====
Genus	Species	Family	Stratigraphic Position	Material	Notes	Images
Hypolagus	H. sp	Leporidae				
Oreolagus	O. nebrascensis	Ochotonidae				

==== Rodentia ====
Genus	Species	Family	Stratigraphic Position	Material	Notes	Images
Alphagaulus	A. vetus	Mylagaulidae	middle			
Galbreathia	G. novellus	Mylagaulidae	middle			
Harrymys	H. magnus	Heteromyidae				
Peridiomys	P. rusticus	Heteromyidae				
Miospermophilus	M. wyomingensis	Sciuridae				
Protospermophilus	P. kelloggi	Sciuridae				
Schaubeumys	S. sabrae	Zapodidae				

=== Reptiles ===
Testudines

Genus	Species	Family	Stratigraphic Position	Material	Notes	Images
Hesperotestudo	H. angusticeps	Testudinidae	middle			

== See also ==
- List of fossiliferous stratigraphic units in Nebraska
- Paleontology in Nebraska
