= Wreford Limestone =

Geologic formation in Kansas, United States

- Stratigraphic range: Permian
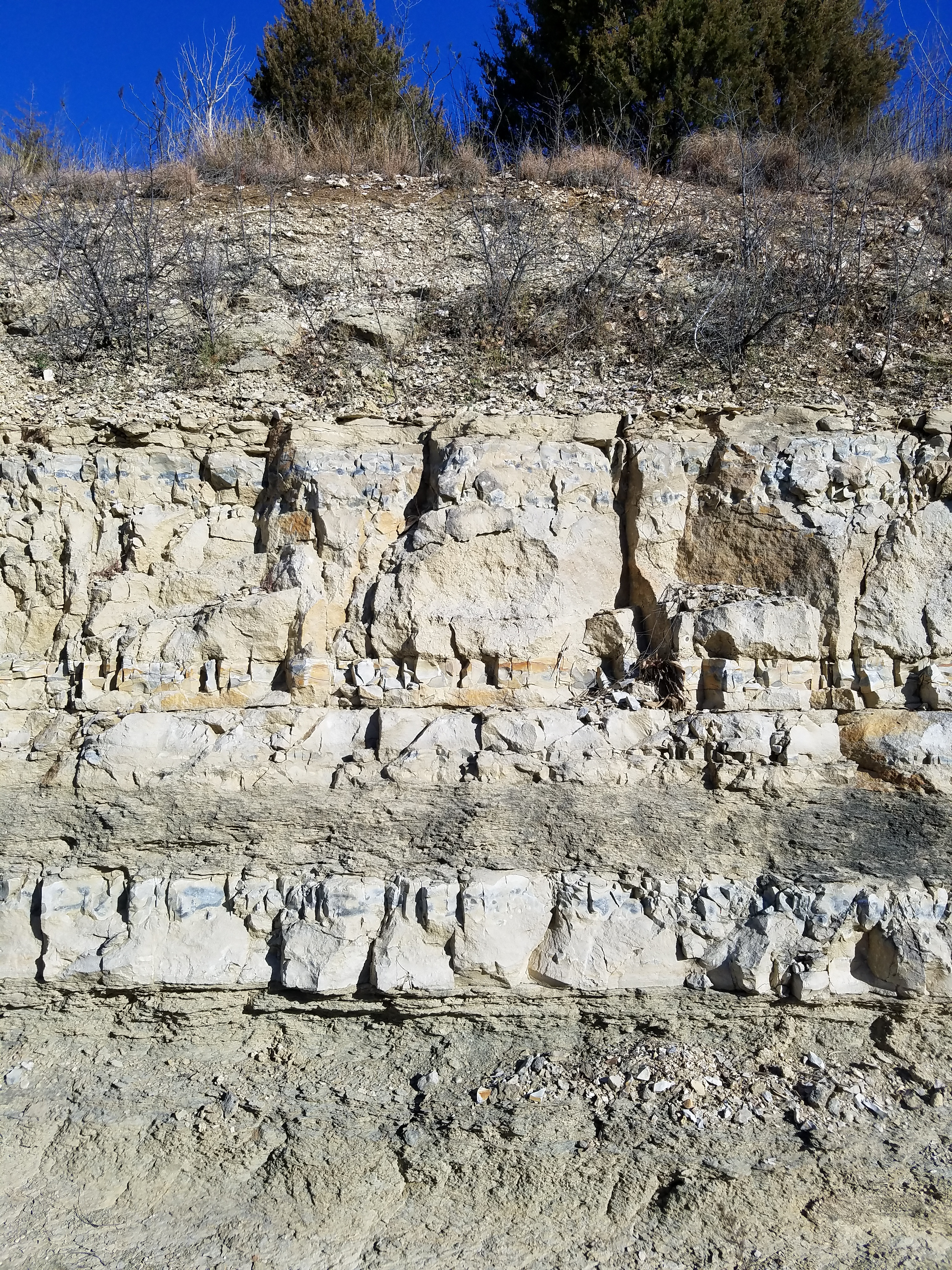
- The flinty Threemile Limestone Member of the Wreford Limestone Formation in Manhattan, Kansas.
- Type: Formation
- Unit of: Chase Group
- Sub-units: Schroyer Limestone; Havensville Shale; Threemile Limestone
- Underlies: Matfield Shale
- Overlies: Speiser Shale

Lithology
- Primary: Flinty limestone and shale

Location
- Location: Flint Hills, Kansas
- Region: Kansas
- Country: United States

Type section
- Named for: Wreford, Kansas

The Wreford Limestone is a geologic formation in Kansas. It preserves fossils dating back to the Permian period.

The Schroyer Limestone and Threemile Limestone members of the Wreford Limestone formation are the lowest of the flint-bearing rock layers of the Flint Hills.

== See also ==
- List of fossiliferous stratigraphic units in Kansas
- Paleontology in Kansas
