= Colter Formation =

Geologic formation in Wyoming, US

- Stratigraphic range: Neogene
- Type: Formation

Location
- Region: Wyoming
- Country: United States

The Colter Formation is a geologic formation in Wyoming. It preserves fossils dating back to the Neogene period.

== See also ==
- List of fossiliferous stratigraphic units in Wyoming
- Paleontology in Wyoming
