= Silverdale Township, Kansas =

Silverdale Township
- Township
- Location in Cowley County
- Coordinates: 37°03′48″N 96°52′37″W
- Country: United States
- State: Kansas
- County: Cowley

Area
  - Total: 52.71 sq mi (136.52 km^{2})
  - Land: 52.5 sq mi (136.1 km^{2})
  - Water: 0.16 sq mi (0.42 km^{2}) 0.31%
- Elevation: 1,148 ft (350 m)

Population (2020)
  - Total: 329
  - Density: 6.26/sq mi (2.42/km^{2})
- GNIS ID: 469088

Silverdale Township is a township in Cowley County, Kansas, United States. As of the 2020 census, its population was 329.

== Geography ==
Silverdale Township covers an area of 52.71 square miles (136.5 km^{2}) and contains no incorporated settlements. The streams of Grouse Creek, Otter Creek and Silver Creek run through this township.

== Communities ==
The township contains the unincorporated community of Silverdale.

== Cemeteries ==
According to the USGS, it contains two cemeteries: Liberty and Silverdale.
