= Delaho Formation =

Geologic formation in Texas, United States

- Stratigraphic range: Neogene
- Type: Formation

Location
- Region: Texas
- Country: United States

The Delaho Formation is a geologic formation dating from the Pliocene and Miocene in Texas. It preserves fossils.

== See also ==
- List of fossiliferous stratigraphic units in Texas
- Paleontology in Texas
