= Barneston Formation =

Geologic formation in the United States

- Stratigraphic range: Permian (Cisuralian)
- Type: Formation
- Unit of: Chase Group
- Underlies: Doyle shale
- Overlies: Matfield shale
- Thickness: 80 ft (24 m)

Location
- Region: Nebraska, Kansas, Oklahoma
- Country: United States

The Barneston Formation is a geologic formation in Kansas, extending into Oklahoma and Nebraska. It preserves fossils dating back to the Early Permian period.

== See also ==
- List of fossiliferous stratigraphic units in Nebraska
- Paleontology in Nebraska
