= Chase Group =

Sedimentary rock unit

- Stratigraphic range: Lower Permian
- Type: Group
- Sub-units: Nolans Limestone; Odell Shale; Winfield Limestone; Doyle Shale; Barneston Limestone; Matfield Shale; Wreford Limestone
- Underlies: Sumner Group
- Overlies: Council Grove Group

Lithology
- Primary: Limestone, shale, mudstone
- Other: Flint, paleosols

Location
- Region: Kansas with Oklahoma and Nebraska
- Country: United States

Type section
- Named for: Chase County, Kansas
- Named by: C.S. Prosser
- Year defined: 1895

The Chase Group is a sedimentary rock unit of Lower Permian age. It is defined in east-central Kansas and extends into Oklahoma and Nebraska as well as the Colorado subsurface where it is undivided. The unit was assigned geologic group rank around 1902.

== See also ==
- List of fossiliferous stratigraphic units in Kansas
- Paleontology in Kansas
