= Blanco Formation =

Geologic formation in Texas and Kansas, United States

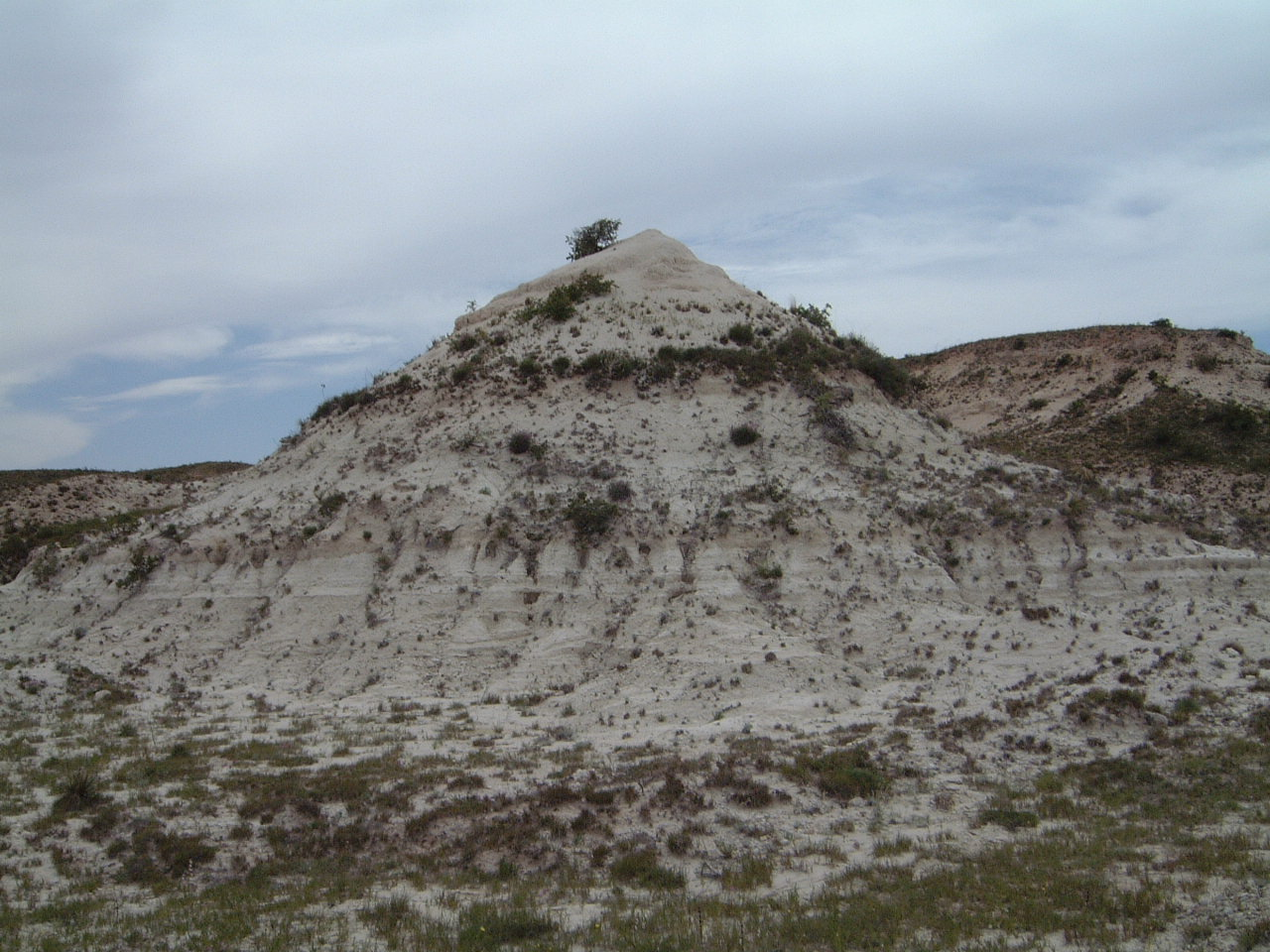
- Blanco Formation outcrops at Mount Blanco; note the minor resistant caliche bedding on the lower hill and the thicker caliche and limestone caprock on the higher bluff in the background.
- Type: Formation
- Sub-units: Kansas only: * Fullerton member * Holdredge member
- Underlies: Pleistocene loess and soil
- Overlies: Ogallala Formation

Lithology
- Primary: sand and gravel whitened by calcium carbonate

Location
- Region: Texas, Kansas
- Country: United States

Type section
- Named for: Blanco Canyon
- Named by: William F. Cummins
- Year defined: 1890

The Blanco Formation, originally named the Blanco Canyon Beds, is an early Pleistocene geologic formation of clay, sand, and gravel whitened by calcium carbonate cementation and is recognized in Texas and Kansas.

After the Ogallala had lain exposed for some time since the Neogene, developing a thick caliche petrocalcic horizon under the surface, deposition of sand and gravel by wind and east-flowing streams resumed to lesser extent during the early Pre-Illinoian glaciation cycles of the Pleistocene. As the weathering and erosion of the exposed Ogallala, rich in calcium carbonate, contributed heavily to the formation, the resulting material is white (blanco). This gave the name to Blanco Canyon, which in turn is the type locality for the Blanco Formation. In Texas, the unit covers the extent of the Llano Estacado, attaining a thickness of 70 feet (21 m). Exceptionally flat, it is conjectured that the limestone beds in the Texas region formed within broad, shallow lakes.

The Blanco Formation is recognized in Kansas where it attains a maximum thickness of over 250 feet (76 m). In much of its extent in Kansas, the Blanco is buried under deep Pleistocene loess and soil deposits and a certain amount of knowledge of the unit comes from well drilling. While the whole of the unit is clay, sand, and gravel, the lower part of the unit is coarser material and the upper part is finer and plastic, with enough distinction to identify two members. In Kansas, the upper member is named Fullerton and the lower is named Holdrege for their respective correspondence with the Fullerton Formation and Holdrege Formation that are identified in Nebraska. The Blanco is not recognized as a unit in Nebraska.

== See also ==
- List of fossiliferous stratigraphic units in Texas
- Paleontology in Texas
- List of fossiliferous stratigraphic units in Kansas
- Paleontology in Kansas
