= Silverdale, Kansas =

Unincorporated community in Cowley County, Kansas

- CDP
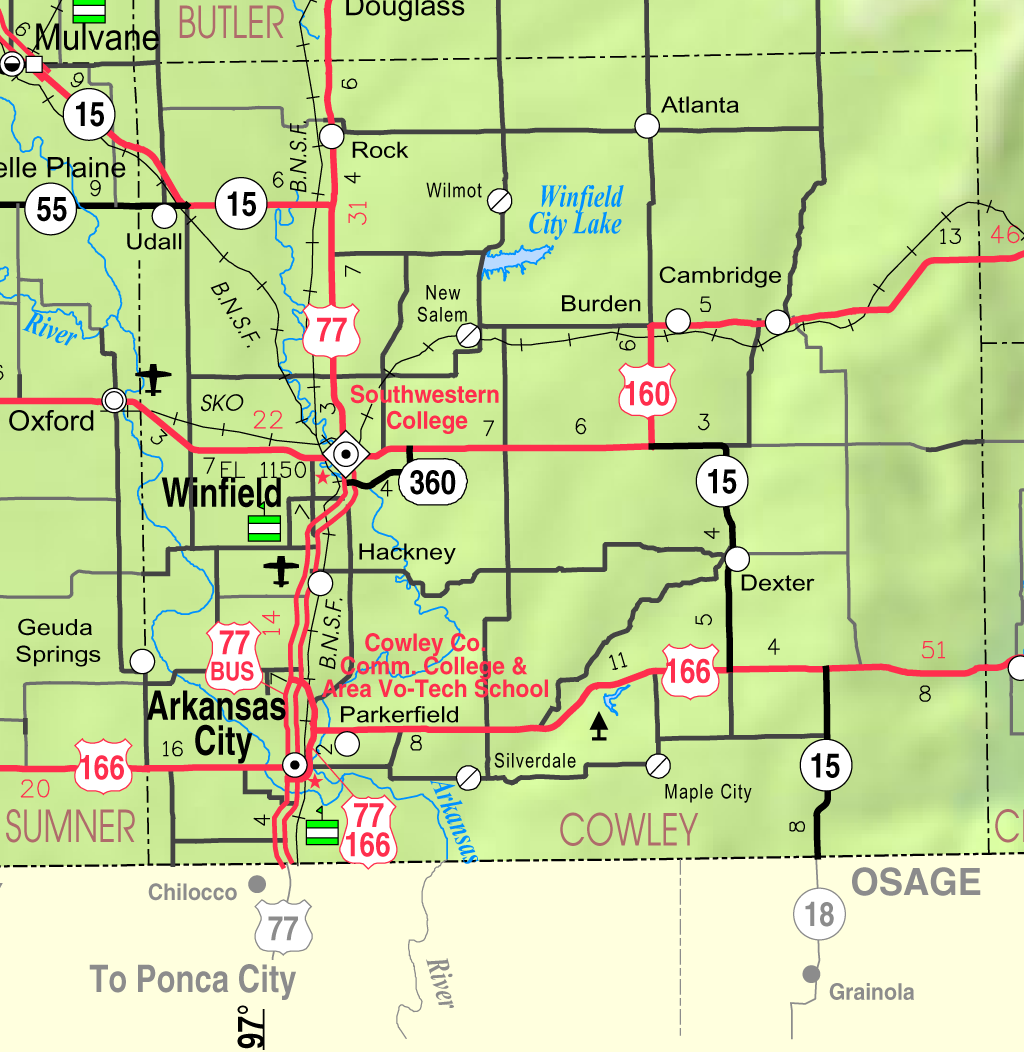
- KDOT map of Cowley County (legend)

- Location within Kansas Location within the United States
- Coordinates: 37°2′31″N 96°54′12″W
- Country: United States
- State: Kansas
- County: Cowley
- Township: Silverdale
- Elevation: 1,089 ft (332 m)

Population (2020)
  - Total: 61
- Time zone: UTC-6 (CST)
  - Summer (DST): UTC-5 (CDT)
- ZIP Code: 67005
- Area code: 620
- FIPS code: 20-65550
- GNIS ID: 469029

Silverdale is a census-designated place (CDP) in Silverdale Township, Cowley County, Kansas, United States. As of the 2020 census, the population was 61.

== History ==
The post office was established June 5, 1871, and temporarily closed October 19, 1883, before being reopened December 12, 1883. It was permanently closed on July 31, 1964.

In 1912, Silverdale was described as a hamlet with a hotel, general store, bank, and other businesses, and in 1910 the population was 100. Today only a church and limestone quarry remain with perhaps a dozen residences. The quarry specialized in fine cut, quality limestone.

== Geography ==
Silverdale is located in southern Kansas, between U.S. Route 166 and the Oklahoma state line. It is about 8 miles east of Arkansas City and is near the Arkansas River.

== Demographics ==
Historical population
Census	Pop.	Note	%±
2020	61		—
U.S. Decennial Census

== Economy ==
Silverdale Quality Stone is the only business in the community, which dates back to 1874.

== Education ==
The community is served by Arkansas City USD 470 public school district.
