= Ustatochoerus =

Ustatochoerus Temporal range: Arikareean-Hemphillian ~23.03–7.246 Ma

Scientific classification
- Kingdom: Animalia
- Phylum: Chordata
- Class: Mammalia
- Order: Artiodactyla
- Family: †Merycoidodontidae
- Genus: †Ustatochoerus; Schultz and Falkenbach, 1941

Species
- See text

Extinct genus of mammals

Ustatochoerus is an extinct genus of oreodont of the family Merycoidodontidae, endemic to North America. It lived during the late Oligocene to Miocene, 24–10.3 mya, existing for approximately 14 mya. Fossils are widespread through the central and western United States.

== Taxonomy ==
Species of Ustatochoerus include U. calaminthus, U. californicus, U. leptoscelus, U. major, U. medius, U. profundus, and U. tedfordi.

== Description ==
Ustatochoerus was a herbivore with a short face, tusk-like canine teeth, heavy body, long tail, short feet, and four-toed hooves.
