= Fleming Formation =

Geologic formation in Louisiana and Texas, United States

- Stratigraphic range: Neogene
- Type: Formation

Location
- Region: Louisiana
- Country: United States

The Fleming Formation is a geologic formation in East Texas and Louisiana. It preserves fossils dating back to the Neogene period.

== See also ==
- List of fossiliferous stratigraphic units in Louisiana
- Paleontology in Louisiana
