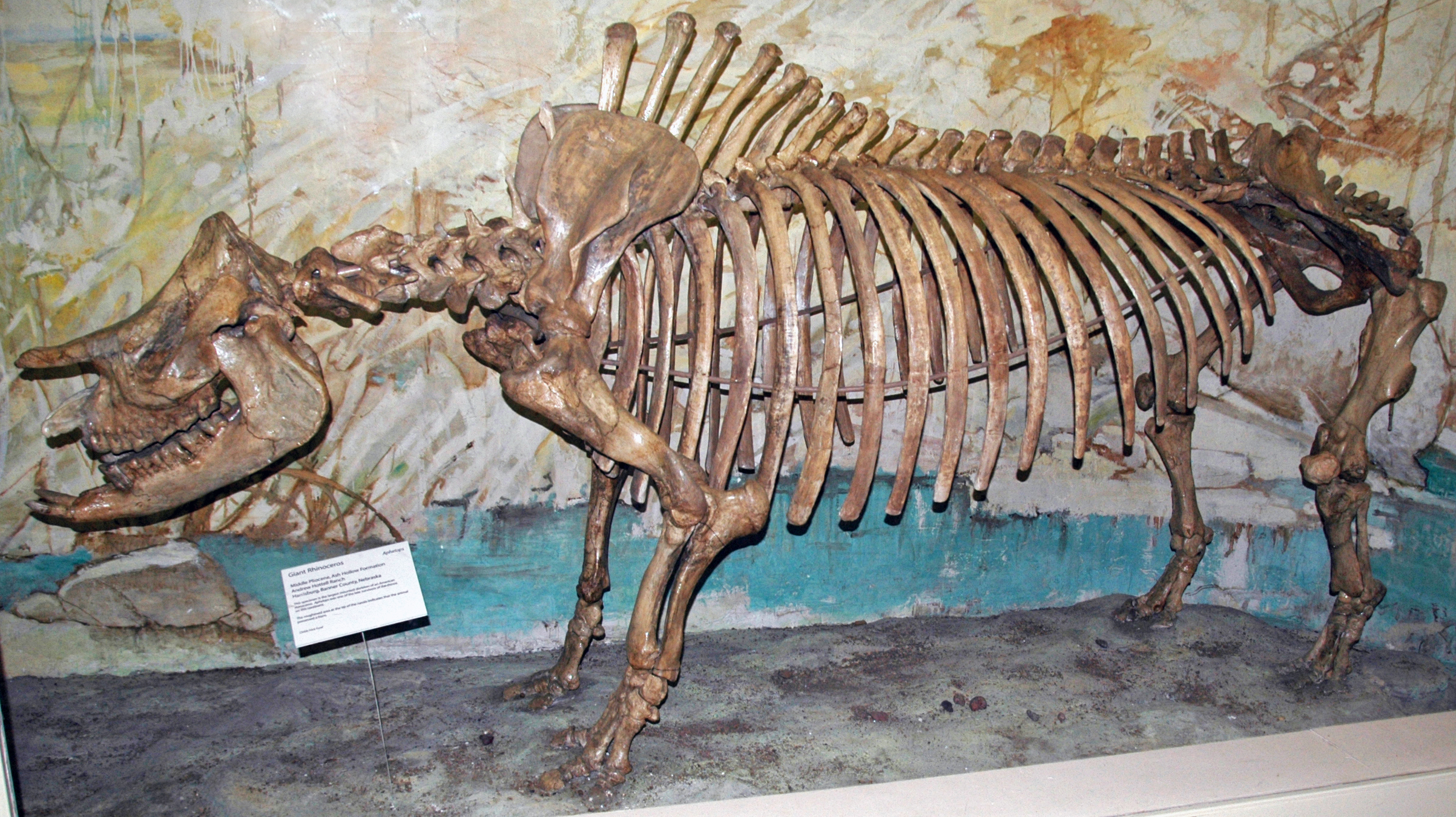
- Skeleton in Nebraska State Museum of Natural History

Scientific classification
- Kingdom: Animalia
- Phylum: Chordata
- Class: Mammalia
- Order: Perissodactyla
- Family: Rhinocerotidae
- Subfamily: †Aceratheriinae
- Genus: †Aphelops; Owen, 1845

Type species
- †Aphelops megalodus Cope, 1873 (as Aceratherium megalodum)

Species
- A. malacorhinus Cope, 1878; A. megalodus Cope, 1873; A. mutilus Matthew, 1924

= Aphelops =

Aphelops Temporal range: Middle Miocene – Early Pliocene, 17.5–4.5 Ma

Extinct genus of mammals

Aphelops (Greek: "smooth" (apheles), "face" (ops), in a reference of lacking a horn) is an extinct genus of hornless rhinocerotids endemic to North America. It lived from the Middle Miocene to the Early Pliocene, during which it was a common component of North American mammalian faunas along with Teleoceras.

== Description ==
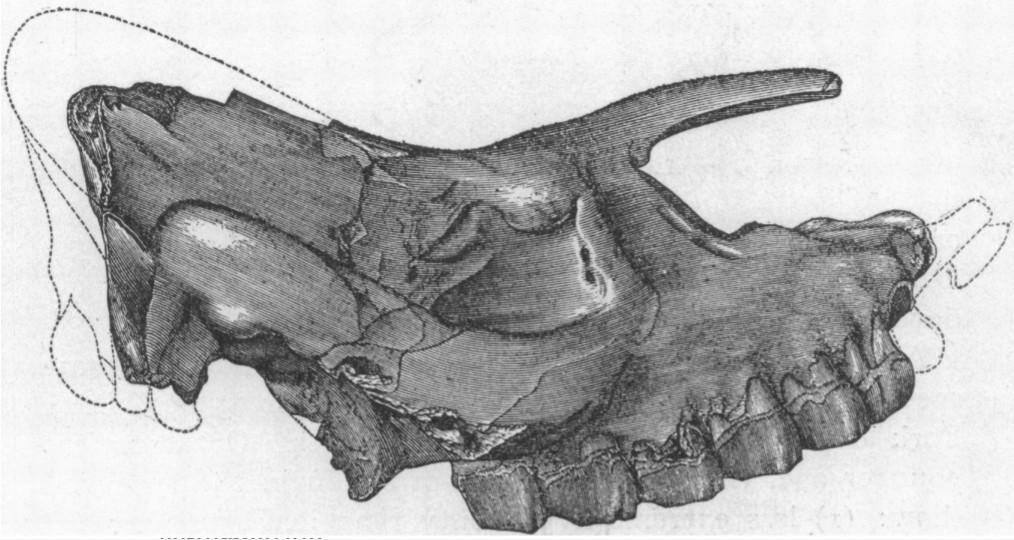
Skull of A. malacorhinus

On the basis of skull size, the largest species of Aphelops is A. mutilus (which is the largest North American rhinoceros) and the smallest is the type species A. megalodus. A. mutilus has been estimated to have weighed 764–1,762 kilograms (1,684–3,885 lb), and A. malacorhinus has been estimated at 889 kilograms (1,960 lb).

Aphelops can be distinguished by other members of the Aceratheriinae by two traits: the arched top of the skull, and the long diastema (gap) between the second incisor (lower tusk) and first premolar. Many other aspects of its anatomy are typical of aceratheriines, including: the absence of a horn on the broad, unfused nasal bones; the reduced premaxilla and lost first incisor; a nasal incision (or notch below the nasal bones) reaching at least the level of the fourth premolar; a triangular-shaped skull when viewed from the rear; narrow zygomatic arches; brachydont or low-crowned teeth without cement; upper molars bearing a fold of enamel known as an anterocrochet; and lower tusks that are subcircular in cross-section.

More derived (specialized) species have larger teeth and longer, more slender nasal bones (also producing a larger incision). The various species also differ in the depth of the nasal incision: in A. megalodus, it reaches the front of the fourth premolar; in A. malacorhinus, it reaches the rear of that tooth; and in A. mutilus, it reaches the first molar.

== Palaeobiology ==
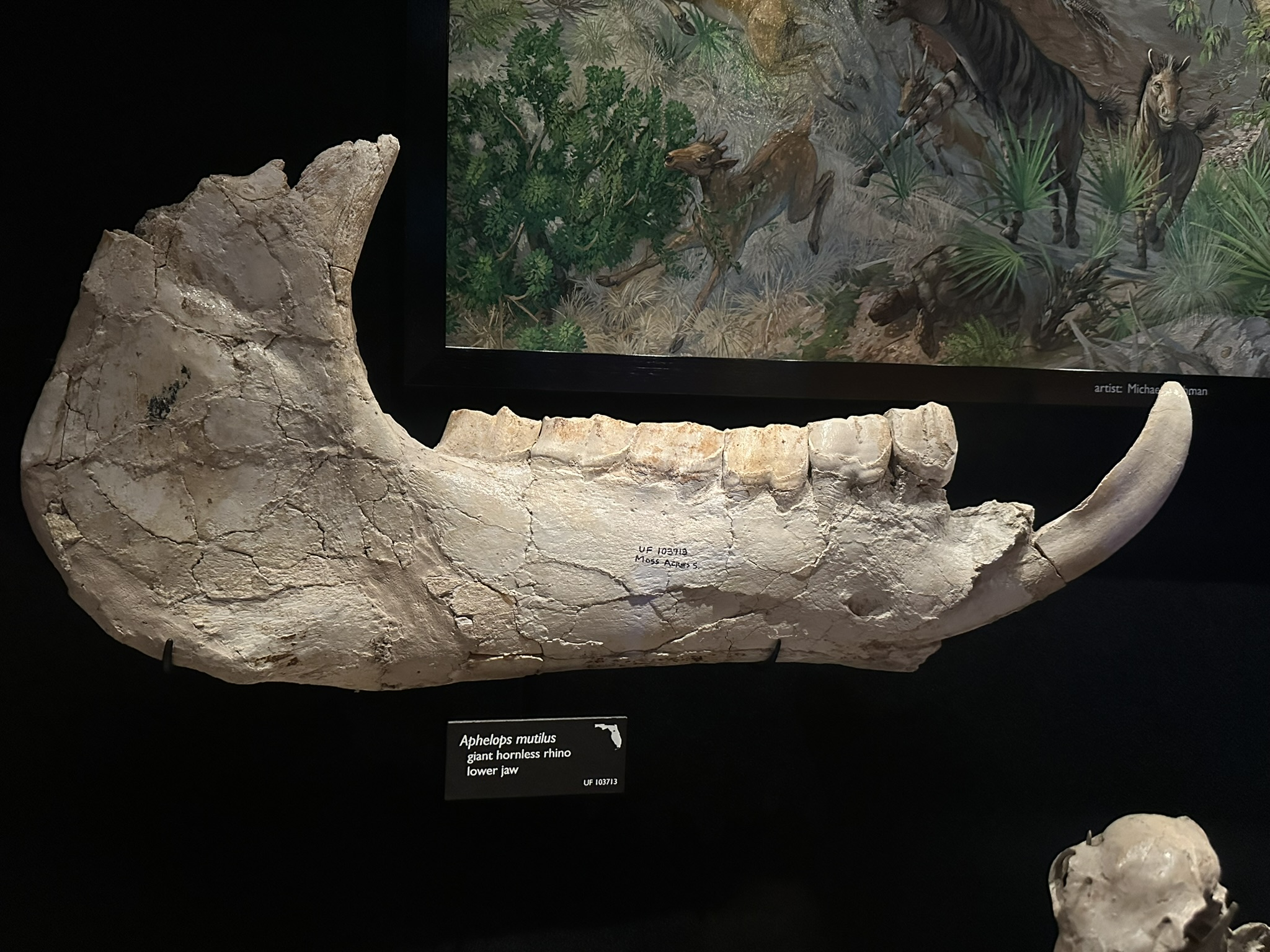
Jaw of A. mutilus, Florida Museum of Natural History

The lower tusks of Aphelops are informative about the sex and age of individuals, as in Teleoceras: males have much thicker tusks, while older individuals have more strongly erupted tusks showing more extensive wear patterns. The stages in the eruption of the molar-like cheek teeth were identical to living rhinos. These factors were used by Matthew Mihlbacher in 2003 to analyze a bone bed of Aphelops known as the Love Island bonebed; adults (between 35% and 68% of maximum lifespan) are most common, there appears to be no male bias, and young males are rare. This is unlike Teleoceras, where young males are disproportionately preserved in bone beds. Such a difference may imply different social behaviour: young male Aphelops perhaps died less frequently from fighting, and used different kinds of ritualistic displays. Aphelops were probably not completely monogamous, with the degree of sexual dimorphism being suggestive of polygyny.

== Palaeoecology ==
Aphelops is thought to have been a browser on C_{3} plants, like the modern black rhinoceros, with its longer limbs adapted to traversing open, brushy country. Isotopic evidence suggests that, in the Late Miocene, Teleoceras had limited intake on newly-emergent C_{4} grasses, but Aphelops continued to browse. Dental microwear evidence at some sites does however show that Aphelops at times consumed more abrasive foods such as grasses. This is believed to reflect short-term, seasonal shifts towards mixed feeding or perhaps major ecological disturbances causing the animals' diets to change drastically in the weeks before they died. The difference in feeding ecologies between Teleoceras and Aphelops explains how they could coexist sympatrically across many environments for 13 million years. Both went extinct at the end of the Hemphillian North American land mammal age, most likely due to rapid climate cooling, increased seasonality and expansion of C_{4} grasses.
