= Paleontology in Nebraska =

Paleontological research in the U.S. state of Nebraska

The location of the state of Nebraska

Paleontology in Nebraska refers to paleontological research occurring within or conducted by people from the U.S. state of Nebraska. Nebraska is world-famous as a source of fossils. During the early Paleozoic, Nebraska was covered by a shallow sea that was probably home to creatures like brachiopods, corals, and trilobites. During the Carboniferous, a swampy system of river deltas expanded westward across the state. During the Permian period, the state continued to be mostly dry land. The Triassic and Jurassic are missing from the local rock record, but evidence suggests that during the Cretaceous the state was covered by the Western Interior Seaway, where ammonites, fish, sea turtles, and plesiosaurs swam. The coasts of this sea were home to flowers and dinosaurs. During the early Cenozoic, the sea withdrew and the state was home to mammals like camels and rhinoceros. Ice Age Nebraska was subject to glacial activity and home to creatures like the giant bear Arctodus, horses, mammoths, mastodon, shovel-tusked proboscideans, and Saber-toothed cats. Local Native Americans devised mythical explanations for fossils like attributing them to water monsters killed by their enemies, the thunderbirds. After formally trained scientists began investigating local fossils, major finds like the Agate Springs mammal bone beds occurred. The Pleistocene mammoths Mammuthus primigenius, Mammuthus columbi, and Mammuthus imperator are the Nebraska state fossils.

== Prehistory ==
Map of North America during the mid-Cretaceous Period, illustrating the Western Interior Seaway

No Precambrian fossils are known from Nebraska, and the state's fossil record begins in the Paleozoic. From the Cambrian through the Devonian, Nebraska was covered by a shallow sea. None of the rocks deposited in this environment are exposed at the surface, so its fossil record is poorly known. Nevertheless, the fossil record of nearby states suggests that Nebraska was probably home to brachiopods, corals, and trilobites. During the Carboniferous, the sea retreated westward and was replaced by large swamps growing in river deltas. During the Carboniferous Period, local invertebrates included cephalopods, coral, crinoids and fusulinids. On land, the local flora also left behind fossils. During the Permian, most of Nebraska was a terrestrial environment, but both brackish and freshwater habitats were present. The latter were home to aquatic plants, amphibians, and fishes.

From the Triassic to Jurassic, Nebraskan sediments were being eroded rather than deposited although the Morrison formation can be seen. The Cretaceous Dakota Formation of the eastern part of the state preserved fossils of local dinosaurs. Later in the Cretaceous, Nebraska was covered by seawater. This sea was called the Western Interior Seaway. Ammonites, fish, sea turtles, and plesiosaurs swam in these waters. The plesiosaurs could reach lengths of up to forty feet. The Cretaceous sharks of Nebraska were very similar to their contemporaries in neighboring Kansas. On land, flowering plants were becoming abundant and the state's coastal plains were home to dinosaurs. Dinosaur fossils unearthed in Nebraska, while rare but not uneard off, include the footprints of ornithopods, and indeterminate hadrosaur remains assigned to the dubious genus Trachodon which were unearthed back in the early 1930s.

The Western Interior Seaway was gone from Nebraska by the early portion of the Cenozoic. It was replaced by a terrestrial environment dotted with lakes and rivers. The contemporary local wildlife were similar to modern forms. On occasion during the Cenozoic, volcanic activity in the Rocky Mountains covered regions of the state in ash. Rhinoceroses first appeared in Nebraska during the Eocene epoch. They would continue to thrive on the plains for the next 35 million years. In fact, more Tertiary-aged rhinoceros remains have been found in Nebraska than any other state.

Rhinoceroses remained and were a prominent member of Oligocene Nebraska's fauna. Camels were a new arrival to Nebraska during the Oligocene. The earliest known example was Poebrotherium. The Oligocene wildlife of Scotts Bluff National Monument left behind footprints that would later fossilize in the sediments of the Arikaree beds. This is one of only seven known Oligocene fossil tracksites in the western United States. About 25 million years ago a stream ran roughly parallel to the modern course of the Niobrara River.

During the Miocene, Nebraska was likely home to massive herds of the small rhinoceras Diceratherium cooki. It composed about one quarter of the remains in the Miocene Agate Springs beds. Other Agate Springs fossils included bears, the pig-like Dinohyus, horses, the chimerical looking perissodactyl Moropus, rhinos, and tapirs. Later in the Miocene, Nebraska was home to the rhino Teleoceras.

During the middle Pliocene, Nebraska was home to Aphelops and Diceratherium, the latter being preserved in Banner County. Roughly 70% of Nebraska's large mammals went extinct during a major extinction episode late in the Pliocene.

During the ensuing Pleistocene, glaciers deposited sediments responsible for preserving local life forms. Early in the ensuing Pleistocene epoch, Nebraska was home to Giganticamelus fricki, a gigantic camel more than eleven feet tall. Large mammalian wildlife thrived generally in Nebraska during the Ice Age. Ice Age wildlife of Nebraska included the giant bear Arctodus, horses, jaguars, mammoths, mastodons, shovel-tusked proboscideans, saber-toothed cats, and tapirs. The largest Nebraskan Arctodus specimens have come from Sheridan and Cass Counties. Mastodon and mammoth fossils have been found in all 93 counties of Nebraska. Woolly mammoth remains were preserved most abundantly in the western half of the state in areas like Dawes and Sioux Counties.

Post-Kansan glaciation Nebraska was home to bear, giant bears, giant bison, caribou, wild cats, wild cattle, cougars, deer, jaguars, true moose, animals resembling musk oxen, actual musk oxen, mountain sheep, and giant stag-moose. Archidiskodon imperator maibeni left remains in Lincoln County. Platycerabos dodsoni was a wild cow known from Cass County. Other Late Pleistocene mammals included Amebelodon fricki, extinct bison species, modern bison, modern coyotes, and a saber-toothed cat unrelated to Smilodon. The camel Camelops appeared during the later Pleistocene. Some Nebraskan fossil-bearing deposits of Late Pleistocene age preserve animal remains associated with humans.

== History ==
=== Indigenous interpretations ===
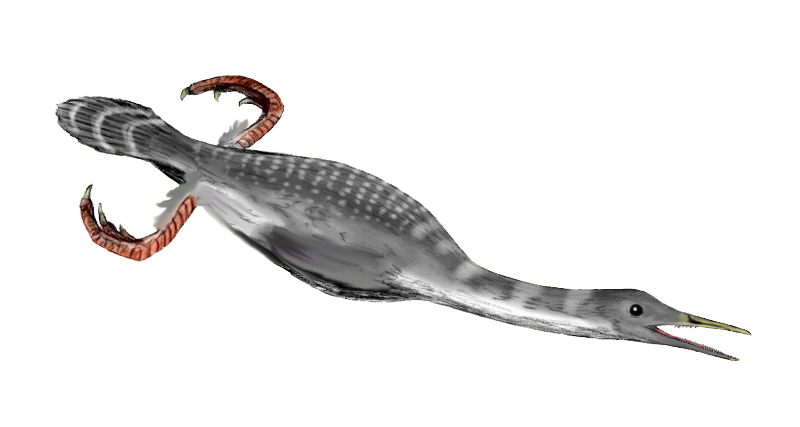
Hesperornis.

Local indigenous people devised legends to explain the fossils they encountered. The Cheyenne people of Nebraska believed in mythical thunderbirds and water monsters that were in endless conflict with each other. The thunderbirds were said to resemble giant eagles and killed both people and animals with arrows made of lightning. People occasionally discovered stony arrowheads thought to come from the thunderbirds' arrows. According to folklorist Adrienne Mayor, these supposed arrowheads were likely fossil belemnites, which were compared to missiles by other indigenous American cultures, like the Zuni people.

The fossils of the Niobrara chalk may have been influential on these stories. The pterosaur Pteranodon and marine reptiles like mosasaurs are preserved in Niobrara Chalk deposits and associated remains may have been interpreted as evidence for antagonism between immense flying animals and serpentine aquatic reptiles. Fossils of the large toothed diving bird Hesperornis are also found in the Niobrara chalk, sometimes preserves inside specimens of large predatory marine reptiles. Observations of similar fossils in the past may have been seen as further evidence for thunderbird-water monster conflict.

The Cheyenne believe that there were many different kinds of water monsters that lived not only in lakes, rivers, and springs but also high bluffs and hills. The locations given as water monster habitat are similar to the locations where local marine fossils can be found as fossils often erode out of hillsides or stream banks. The Cheyennes feared the water monsters, because they could be dangerous predators or capsize their canoes. Even in modern times, tradition-minded Cheyenne sometimes take pains to avoid sleeping to close to springs due to fears of water monsters.

=== Scientific research ===
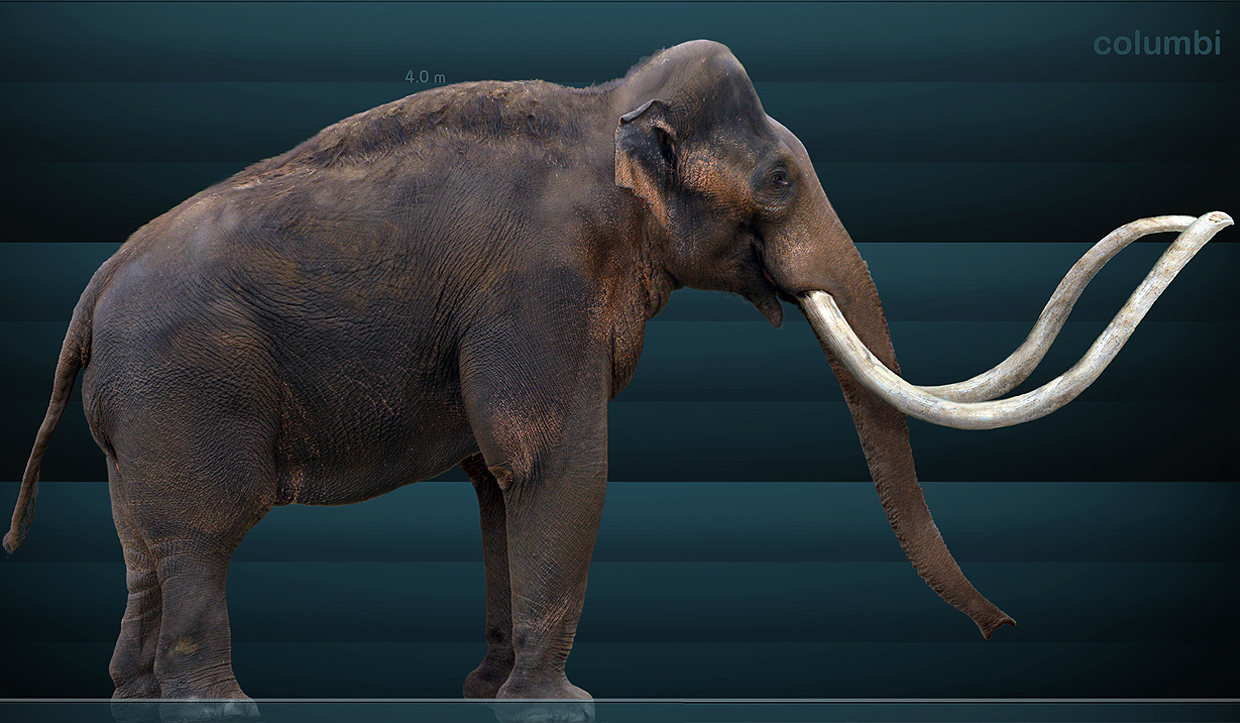
Restoration of a Columbian mammoth (Mammuthus columbi)

The Tertiary mammal fossils of Nebraska have been a major subject of study among American vertebrate paleontologists. In 1867, a government survey led by Ferdinand Vandeveer Hayden discovered mammoth and mastodon fossils in Sheridan County. Ten years later, in 1877, a scout and rancher named Captain James H. Cook discovered a Miocene bone bed in Sioux County now known as the Agate Springs Quarries or Agate Bone Beds. These rich deposits are so dense with bones that a single forty foot slab of sandstone preserved more than 4,300 bones from at least 1,700 individual animals. The total number of fossils preserved here may number in the millions. The tiny rhinoceros Diceratherium cooki composed about one quarter of the remains in the Agate Springs beds. This was the first paleontological discovery to attract public attention to the state's fossils. In 1891, the University of Nebraska began its fieldwork in the western half of the state.

Only a few miles away from the Agate Springs deposits, F. B. Loomis made another major discovery. In 1907, he found a fossil camel. Only a single year later, five major institutions had already dispatched field workers to the region. That year, the excavators uncovered 21 prehistoric camel skeletons. The following year, the American Museum of Natural History successfully recovered nine additional camel skeletons from the site Loomis discovered. Most of the skeletons uncovered throughout the excavations were articulated. It is uncertain how so many camels came to be preserved at this one location with one possible interpretation suggesting that the camels were all victims of a single disaster. During the construction of the Medicine Creek Dam in Frontier County, a collaboration between the University of Nebraska and other institutions spearheaded an effort to study the local fossils and archaeological relics of seven different locations before they were submerged by the reservoir created by the dam. By 1949, the dam was completed and several fossil sites lost.

In 1961, the University of Nebraska opened the Trailside Museum of Natural History at Fort Robinson State Park, which was converted from the Post Theater. The museum houses many fossils and its creation has been regarded as one of the University of Nebraska's most significant contributions to local paleontology. Two years later, in 1963, the University of Nebraska reopened its Mastodon Quarry at Red Cloud in the southern part of the state, and important finds were made during the ensuing field work. One was a relatively complete skeleton of a relative of the mastodon, but bearing four tusks. The skeleton was mounted and turned into a museum exhibit. On May 24, 1965, the Agate Fossil Beds became a national monument. The land was owned by Harold J. Cook, son of the James H. Cook who discovered them. Cook donated the land for the monument.

== Protected areas ==
- Agate Fossil Beds National Monument
- Ashfall State Historical Park
- Hudson-Meng Bison Bonebed
- Toadstool Geologic Park

== Natural history museums ==
- Hastings Museum of Natural and Cultural History, Hastings, Nebraska
- Trailside Museum of Natural History at Fort Robinson State Park, Crawford, Nebraska
- University of Nebraska State Museum, Lincoln, Nebraska
