= Cottonwood Limestone =

Historic stone resource in the Midwestern United States

- Stratigraphic range: Asselian (Gearyan stage)
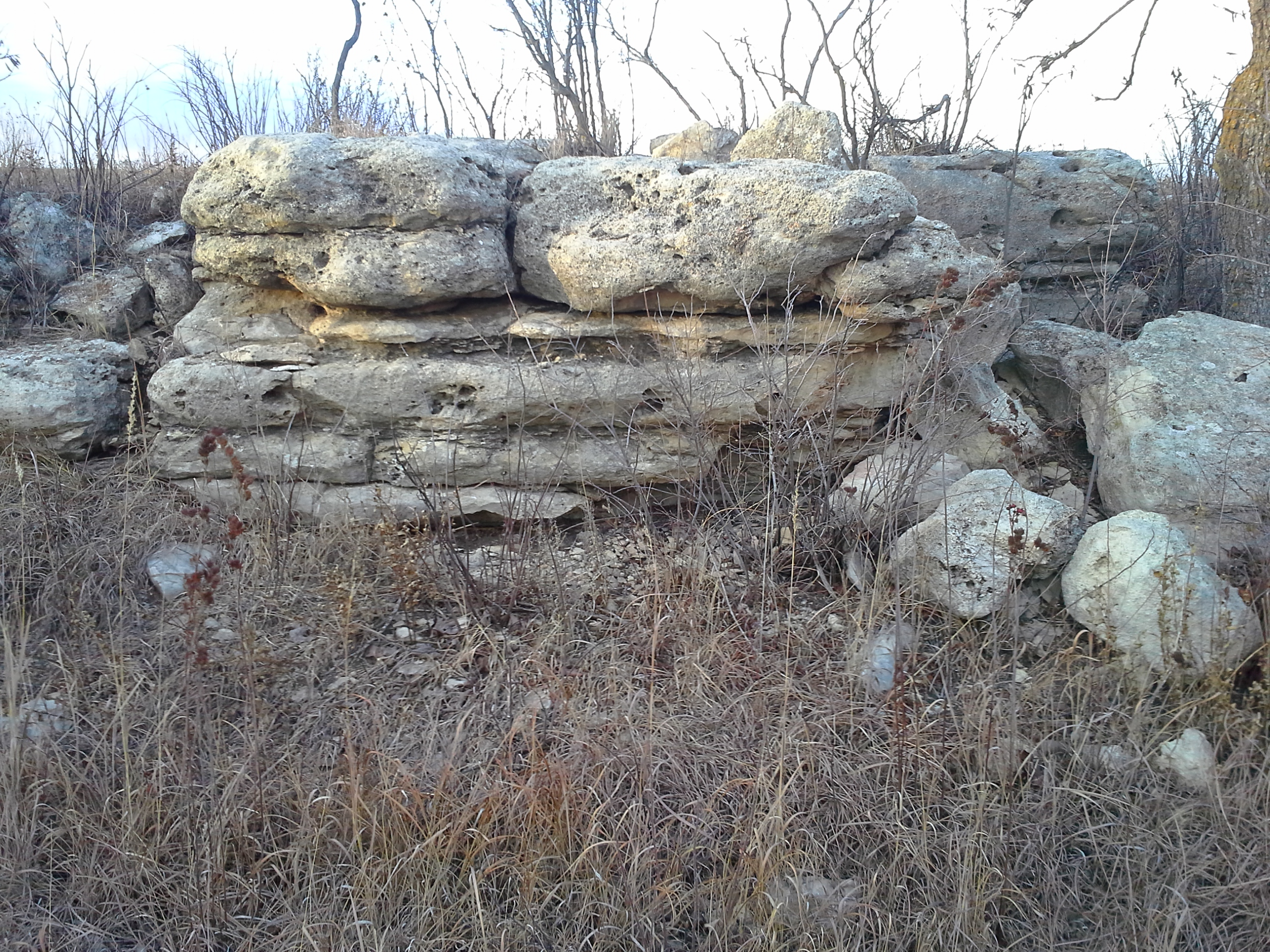
- Well-exposed natural outcrop of the Cottonwood Limestone alongside the Konza Prairie Nature Trail
- Type: Formation Member
- Unit of: Beattie Limestone
- Sub-units: Top Ledge, Bottom Ledge
- Underlies: Florena Shale member of the Beattie Limestone formation
- Overlies: Eskridge Shale
- Thickness: 3–7 ft (0.91–2.13 m) often ~6 ft (1.8 m)

Lithology
- Primary: Limestone
- Other: Calcareous shale Siliceous materials

Location
- Region: Mid-continental
- Country: United States
- Extent: Outcrops from southeast Nebraska to northeast-central Oklahoma

Type section
- Named for: Cottonwood Falls, Kansas
- Named by: Prosser, C. S.
- Year defined: 1894-5

Cottonwood Limestone, or simply the Cottonwood, is a stratigraphic unit and a historic stone resource in east-central Kansas, northeast-central Oklahoma, and southeastern Nebraska in the Midwestern United States. It is the lowest member of the Beattie Limestone formation and commonly outcrops within the deep valleys and on top of the scenic residual ridges of the Flint Hills.

This important building stone, quarried in the Cottonwood River valley, had been used under the names "Cottonwood stone" or "Cottonwood Falls limestone" many years before the name Cottonwood Limestone appeared in scientific publications late in the 19th century. Similarly, "Manhattan stone" was the commercial name used for the same limestone when quarried in the vicinity of Manhattan, Kansas. It was also called "Alma Limestone" when first quarried at Alma, Kansas.

The Cottonwood Limestone is one of the most persistent and easily recognizable horizons in Kansas. This limestone is usually light gray or buff in color, massively bedded, and has an average thickness of about six feet. The upper part of the member in particular is recognizable for being almost entirely made up of the small wheat-grain shaped foraminifera Fusulinida, with few other animal remains. The line of outcrop of the Cottonwood is generally marked by a line of massive rectangular blocks of light gray or bleached, bone-colored limestone, often supporting a line of shrubs. Because of its resistance to weathering, it often forms a prominent escarpment. The Cottonwood Limestone is noteworthy for the persistence of this lithologic character across its range.

== Resources ==
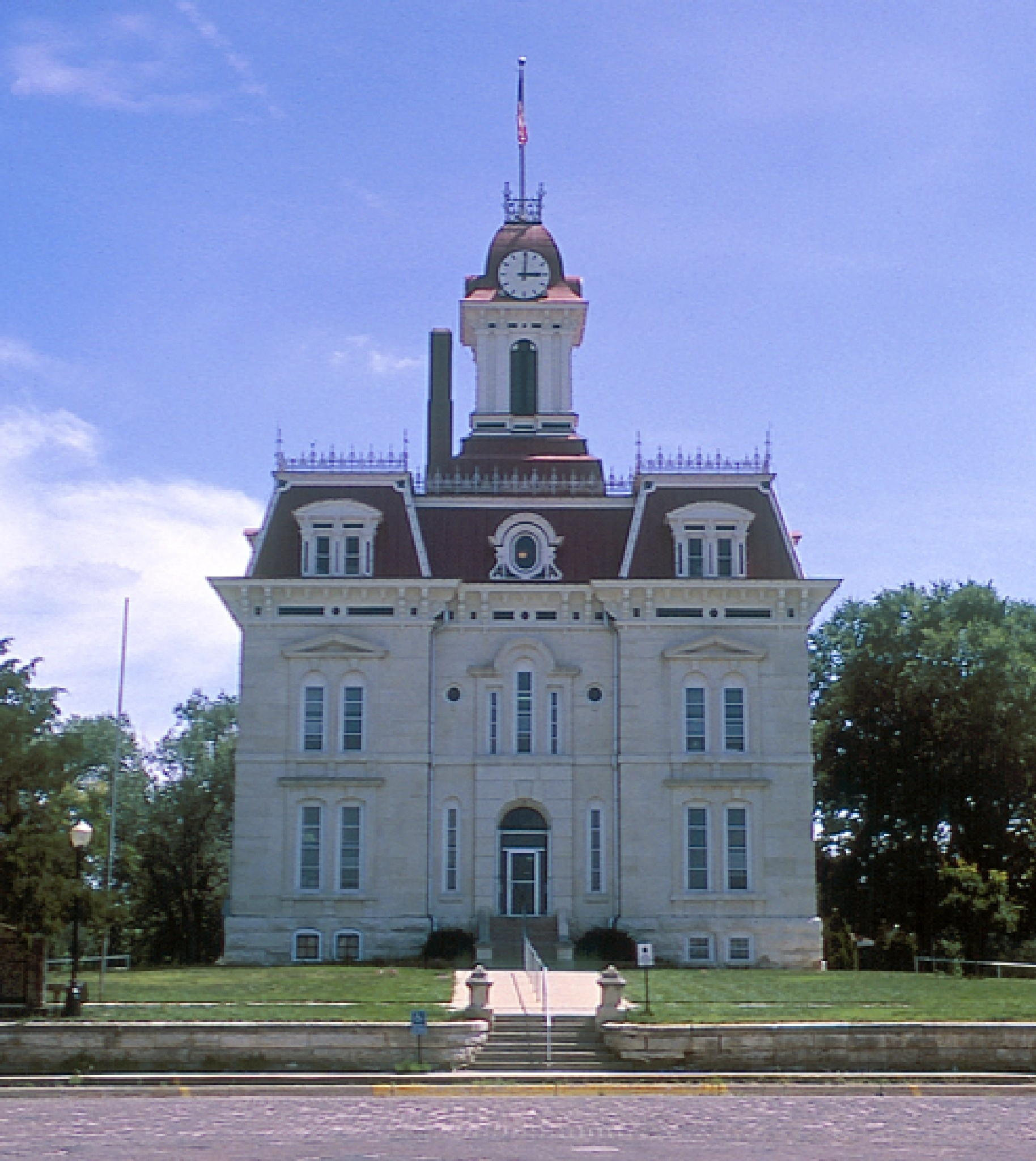
The Chase County Courthouse located in Cottonwood Falls, Kansas, is an example of the many landmark buildings within the Flint Hills that are constructed of Cottonwood Limestone.

Aside from shaping the landscapes of the communities within the Flint Hills, this limestone is most notable for its influence on the building architectures of the communities in its region. Near the surface, Cottonwood Limestone is a useful aquifer, while deeper subsurface Cottonwood Limestone is associated with oil and gas producing formations.

=== Construction stone ===
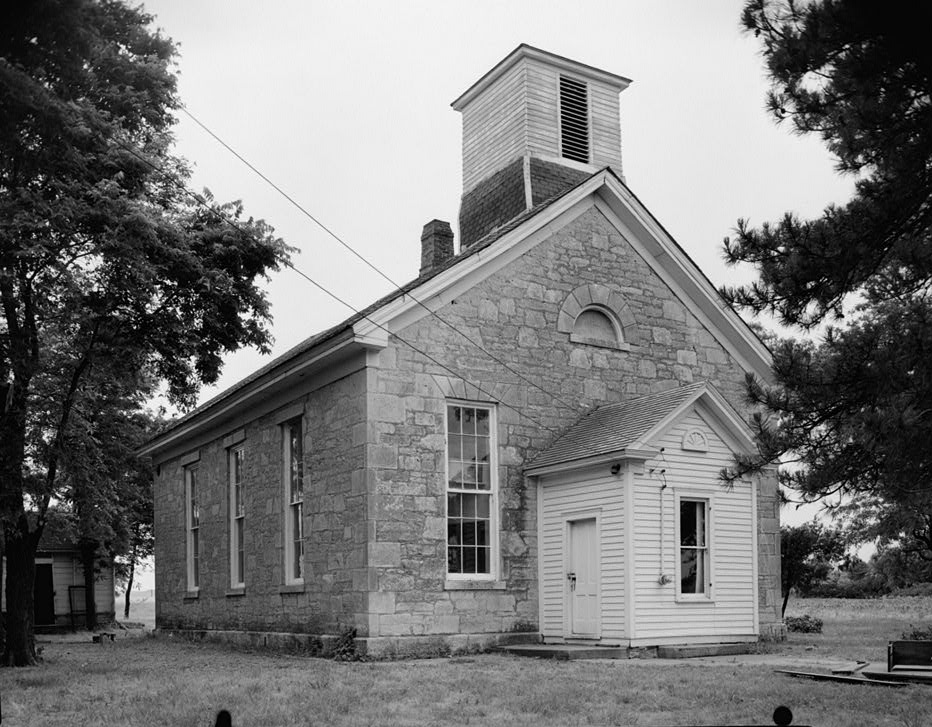
Beecher Bible and Rifle Church, completed in 1862 shortly after the founding of Wabaunsee, Kansas, is an early building constructed of Cottonwood Limestone.

A regionally famous construction material, Cottonwood Limestone is yellowish, buff, to nearly white in color, even-textured, durable, and very suitable for cutting into dimensional stone for masonry. Moreover, its beds of usable stone are particularly massive for the region; blocks of stone three or more feet thick and several feet in length and width can be taken from a ledge. While many other limestone formations are found in the region and have been widely used in local construction, most (excepting most notably the Fort Riley Limestone) weather poorly, lie with much thinner parting beds, or are generally much higher in the typical Permian silica or flint content and so are much more difficult to cut or sculpt. As such, the lithologic characteristics of Cottonwood Limestone has made it one of the best building stones in the state and many past quarries, large and small, may be found on nearly every hill capped by this resource.

Large, cut blocks of Cottonwood Limestone were famously used in historic, monumental buildings in the region, including churches, courthouses, and educational buildings; while rough stones of other limestones are more common in older, smaller homes and buildings. Its use in a building within its region can often be recognized by the use of large cut blocks, near-white or buff color, and showing abundant fossils or molds of “wheat-grain” shaped fusulinids coupled with general absence of spalling, splotchy black coloring from mold that find portions of the stone particularly favorable, and sculptured or protruding rough faces. Especially in older buildings close to a source, Cottonwood Limestone is sometimes paired with the Neva Limestone that is commonly exposed only 35 feet lower in the hills. In this combination, the softer, massive Cottonwood is used for carved trim while the Neva is used, cut or rough, for the general fill and facing, the latter showing a whiter face with smoother glass-like fracture in contrast to the more buff-colored Cottonwood Limestone showing a rougher earthy fracture.

The Cottonwood is the main facing material for the campus buildings of Kansas State University. The Topeka Performing Arts Center as well as much of the Kansas State Capitol and the Great Overland Station in Topeka, Kansas are constructed with Cottonwood Limestone. The iconic Campanile in Lawrence, Kansas, is also built from the once-named “Manhattan stone”. Cottonwood Limestone continues to be popular in constructions, and was recently (2014) used to construct the West Side Stadium Center of the Bill Snyder Family Football Stadium.

Cottonwood Limestone Constructions
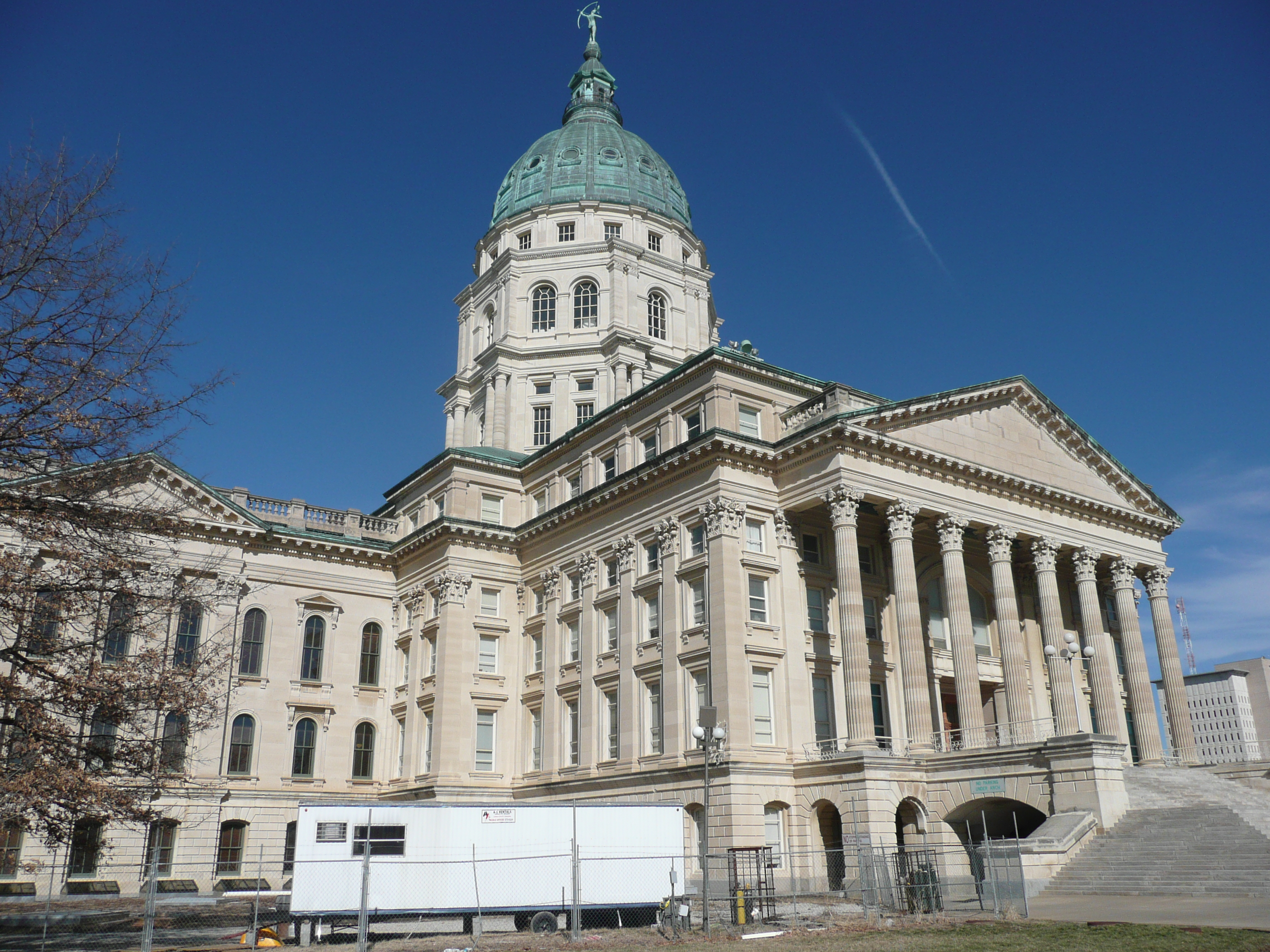
Kansas State Capitol,
Topeka, Kansas

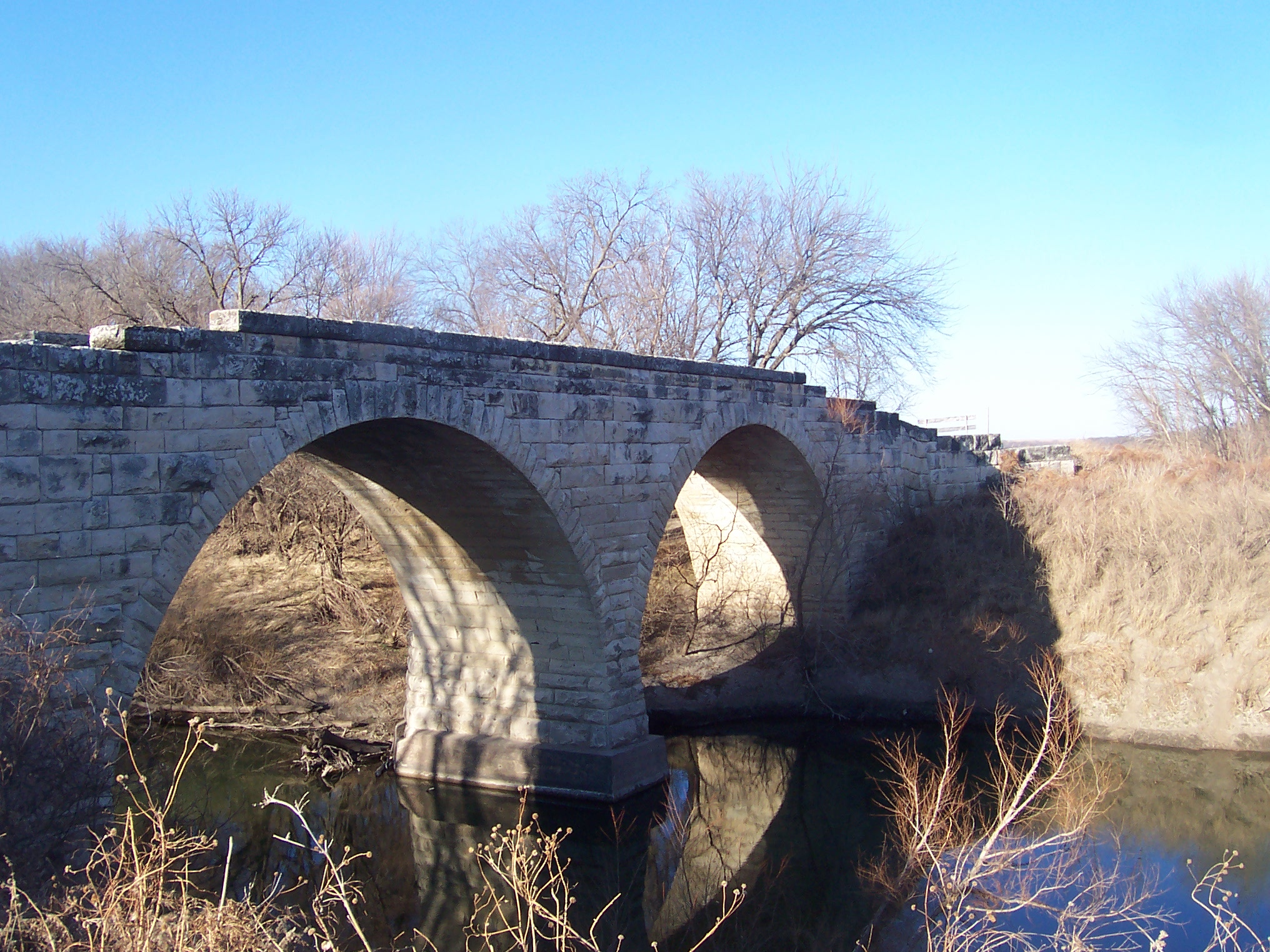
Clements Stone Arch Bridge over the Cottonwood River

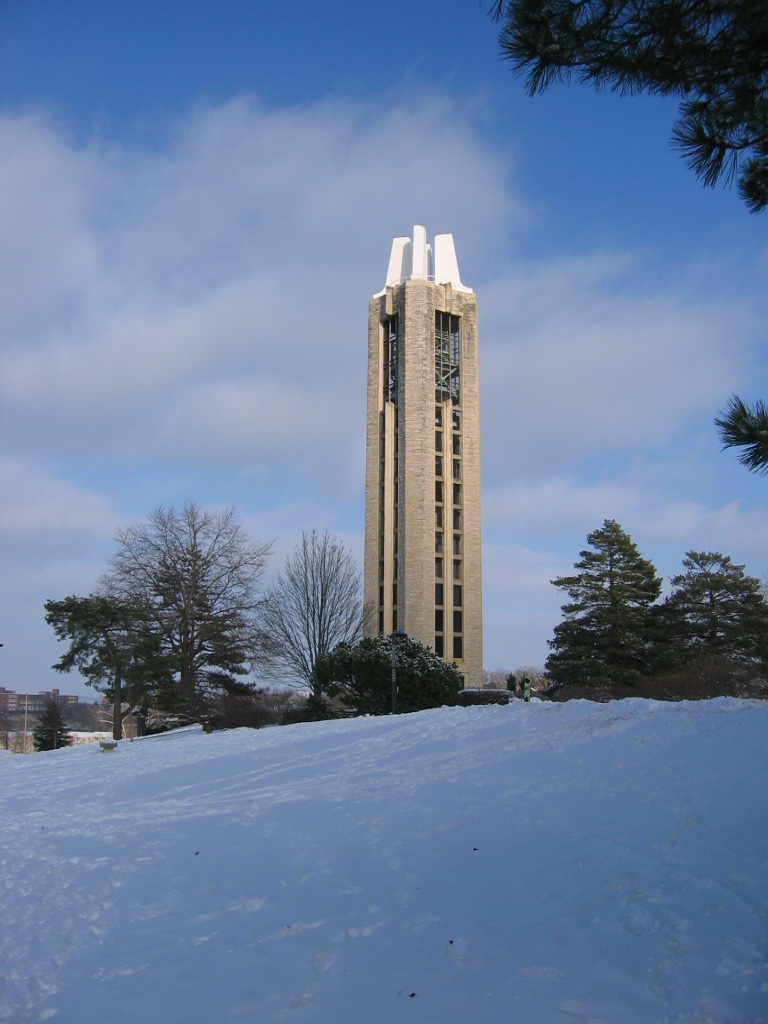
University of Kansas Memorial Campanile,
Lawrence, Kansas

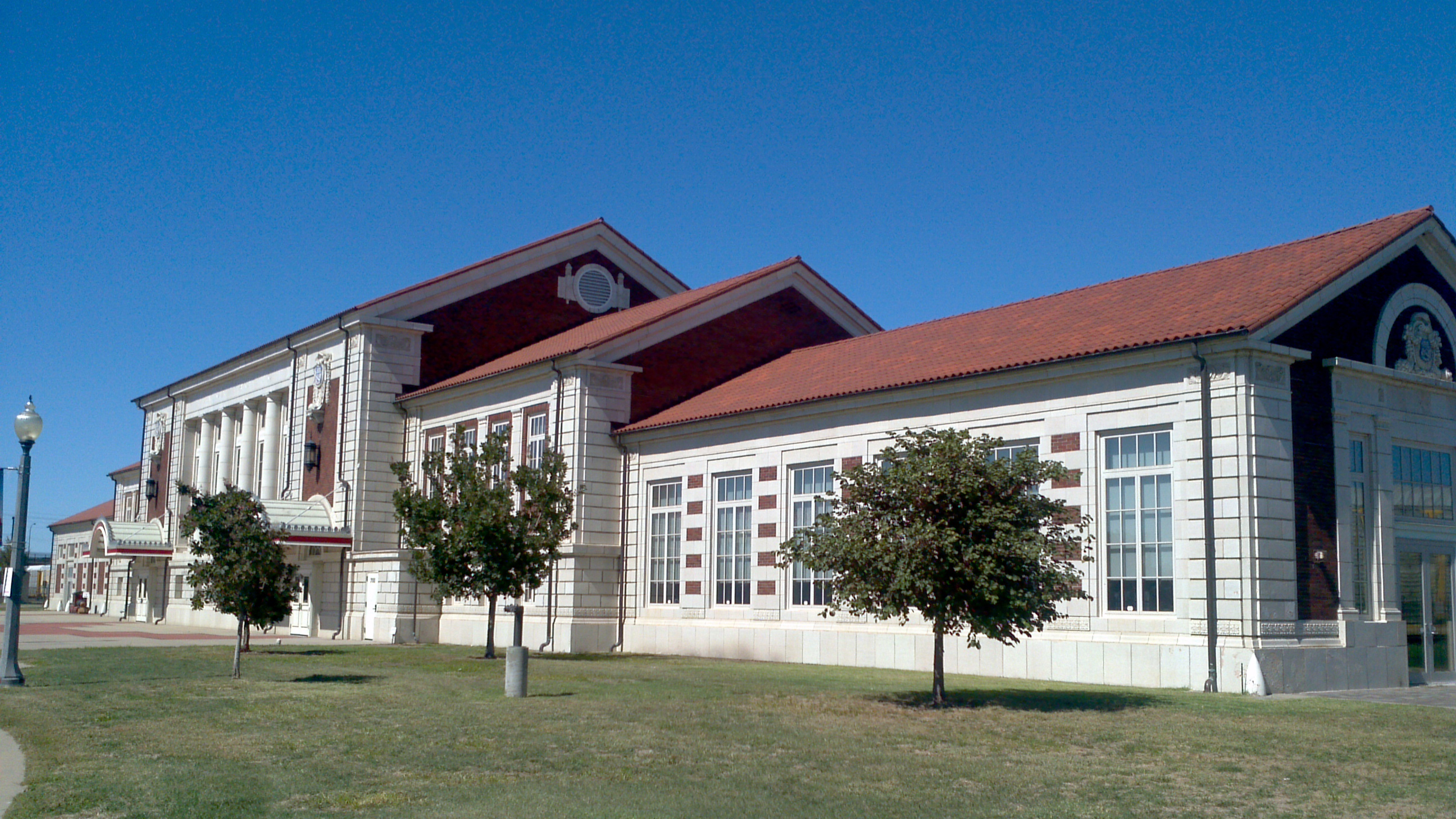
Great Overland Station,
Topeka, Kansas

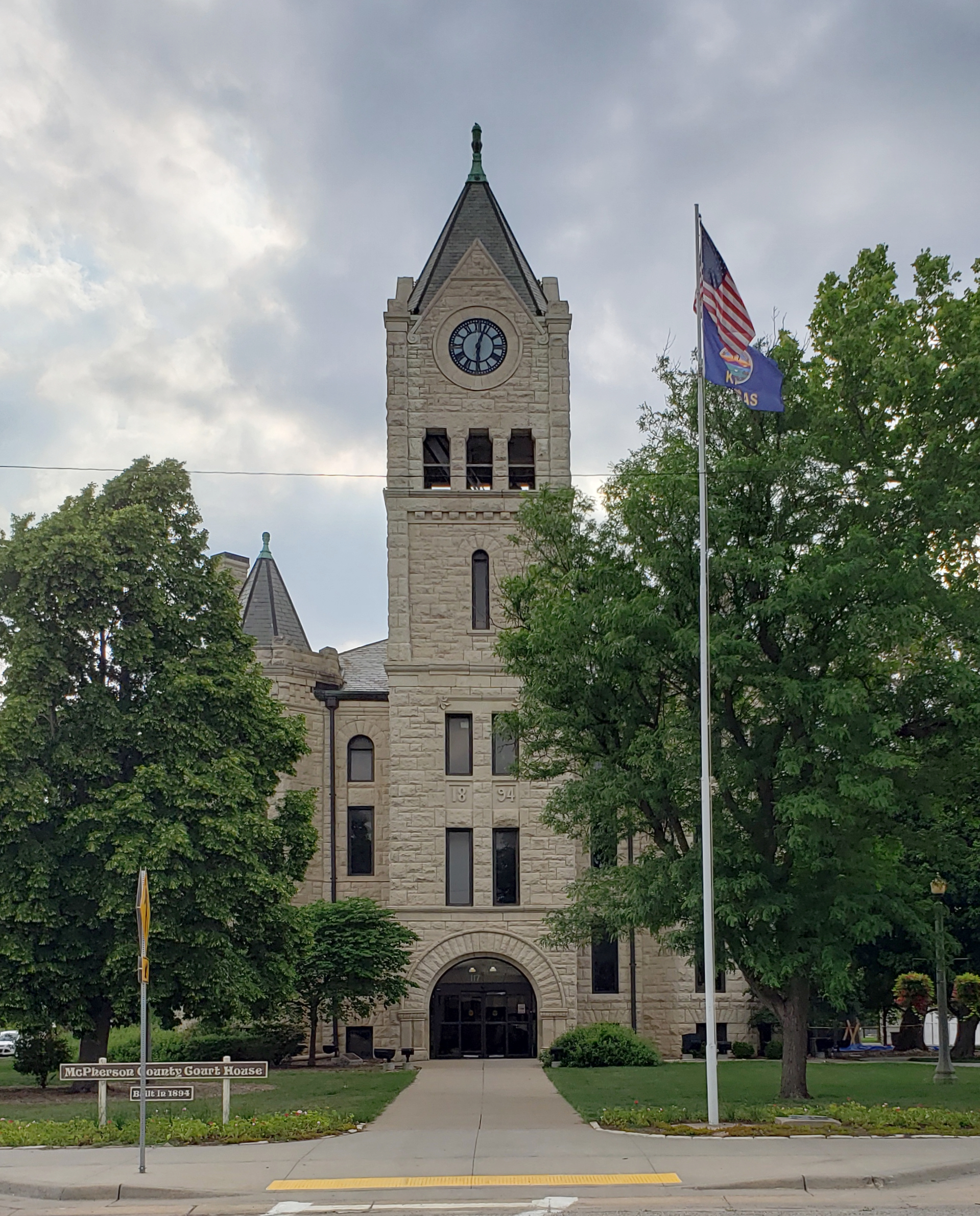
McPherson County Courthouse,
McPherson, Kansas

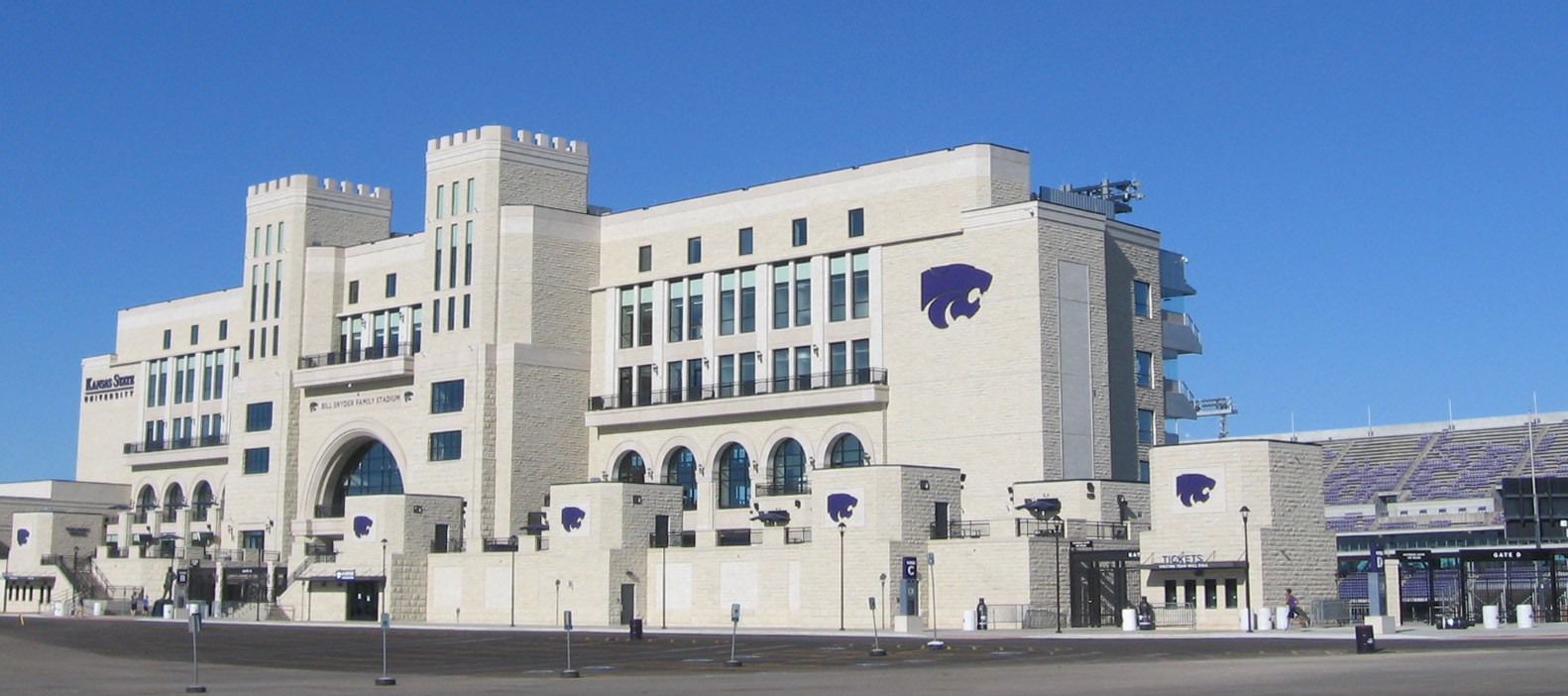
Bill Snyder Family Football Stadium,
Manhattan, Kansas

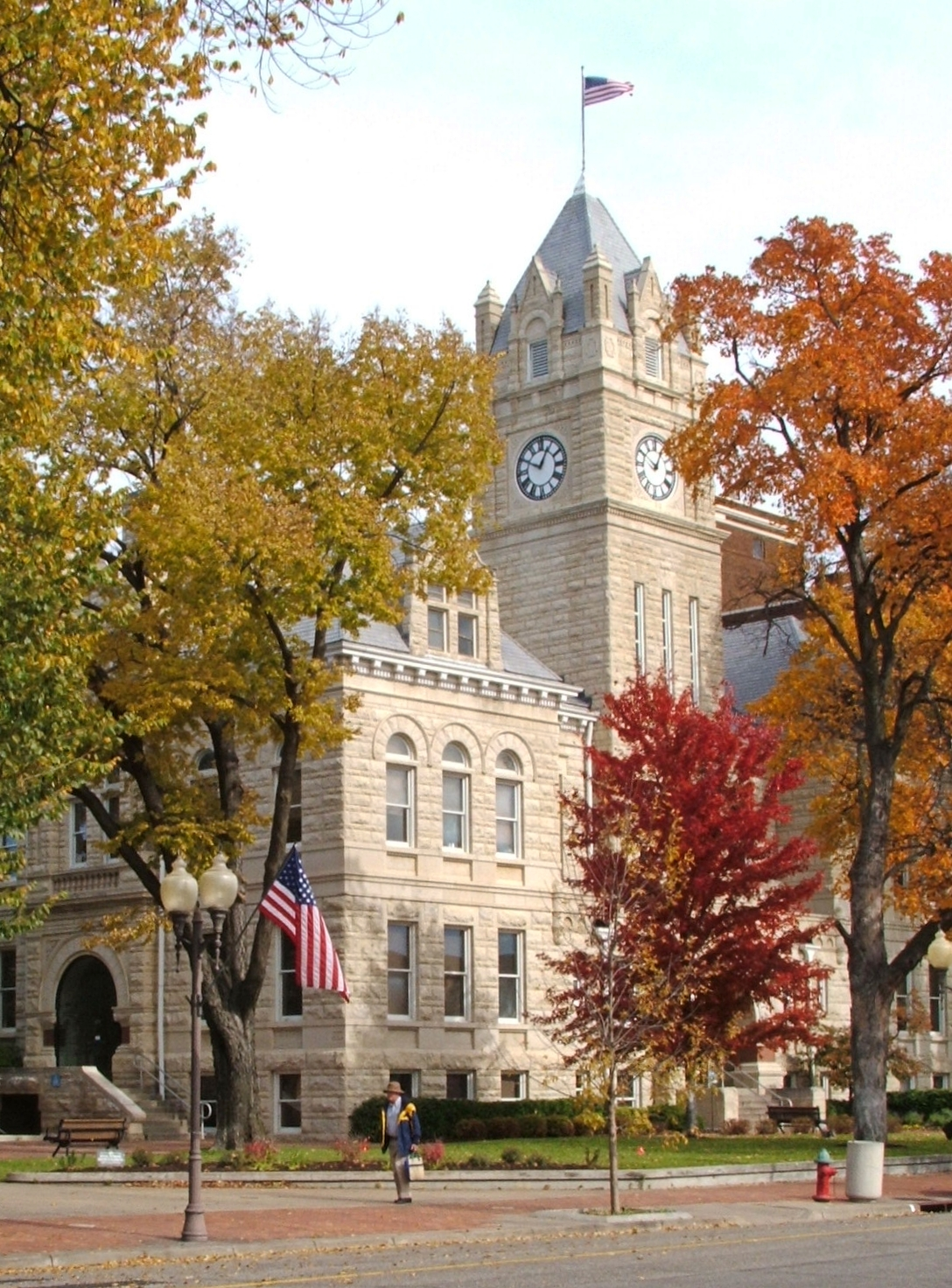
Riley County Courthouse,
Manhattan, Kansas

=== Sculpture ===
The massive, fine-grained, bright-white character of this limestone makes it a practical stone for large sculptures:

- Dyche Hall Grotesques, University of Kansas, Sculptors: Joseph Robaldo Frazee and Vitruvius Frazee
- Prairie Passage, Lyon County Fair Grounds, Emporia, Kansas, Sculptors: 1992 Kansas Sculptors Association Team Carve
- Tonantzin, Elder Center, Prairie Band of Potawatomi Nation Reservation, Sculptors: James Wahwassuck

=== Aquifer ===
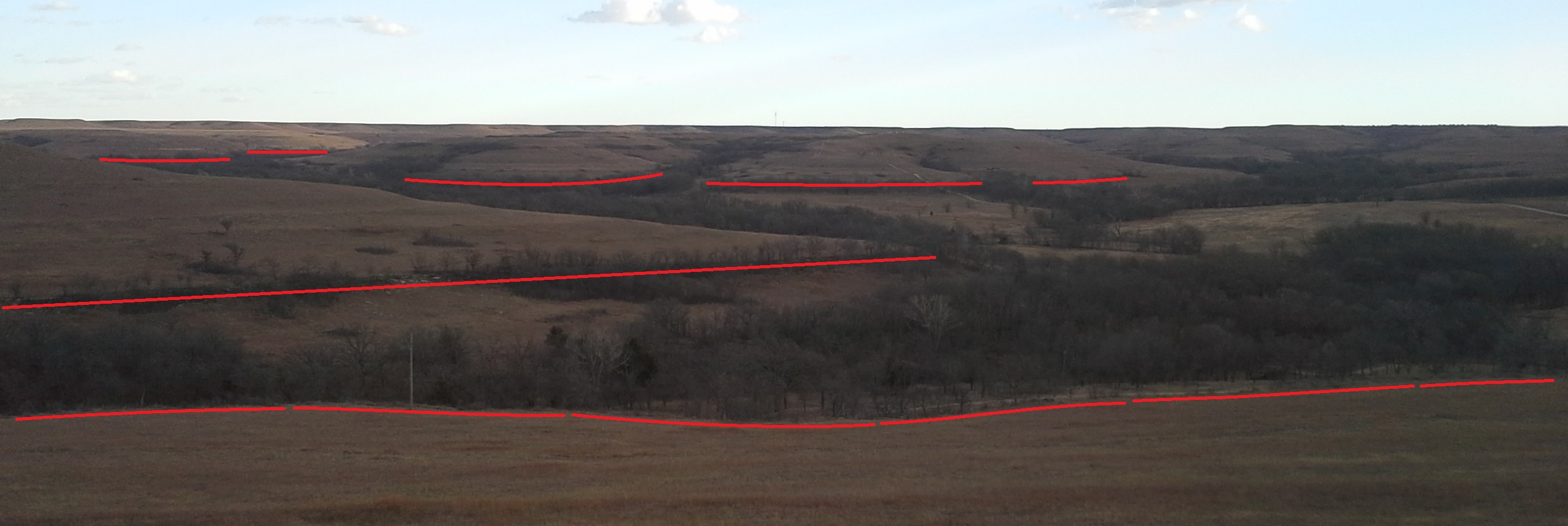
Highlighted here with red lines, the boulders and moisture-seeking shrubs make the Cottonwood Limestone easy to identify and trace along the valleys within the Konza Prairie.

The Cottonwood is a reliable surface limestone aquifer in the region. The brush line seen on many hillsides at the base of this member indicates the moisture it provides. Many springs issue from beneath the massive ledge, especially the west-facing exposures—many of which serve as a source of water for livestock. In many places, springs or shallow wells from the Cottonwood provide large supplies of water for domestic home and farm use. This is especially true along westward-facing hillsides, as strata generally dip to the northwest.

=== Natural gas ===
Natural gas has been produced in the Cottonwood Limestone in southwestern Kansas and northwestern Oklahoma. The member made an impact on gas production in the region in the 1960s and 1970s, particularly in the discovery of additional reserves in previously established and even abandoned fields.

== Distribution ==
As the prominent member of the Beattie Limestone formation, Cottonwood Limestone can be traced on the outcrop from Nemaha County, Nebraska, southward to Osage County, Oklahoma, and followed in the subsurface westward to the vicinity of the Colorado-Kansas line as well as into northwestern Oklahoma.

The surface outcropping of the Cottonwood Limestone is easily traced in the Flint Hills south of the Kansas River and east of Manhattan, Kansas. In Manhattan, it forms the scenic ridges surrounding the old downtown in the southeast of the city. From there, the line of outcrop is a tortuous one extending several miles north and west along the Kansas and Big Blue rivers and their tributaries.

This limestone forms extensive outcrops in the Cottonwood River valley that shares its name; outcrops can be followed several miles up every tributary valley around Cottonwood Falls.

== Lithologic character and thickness ==
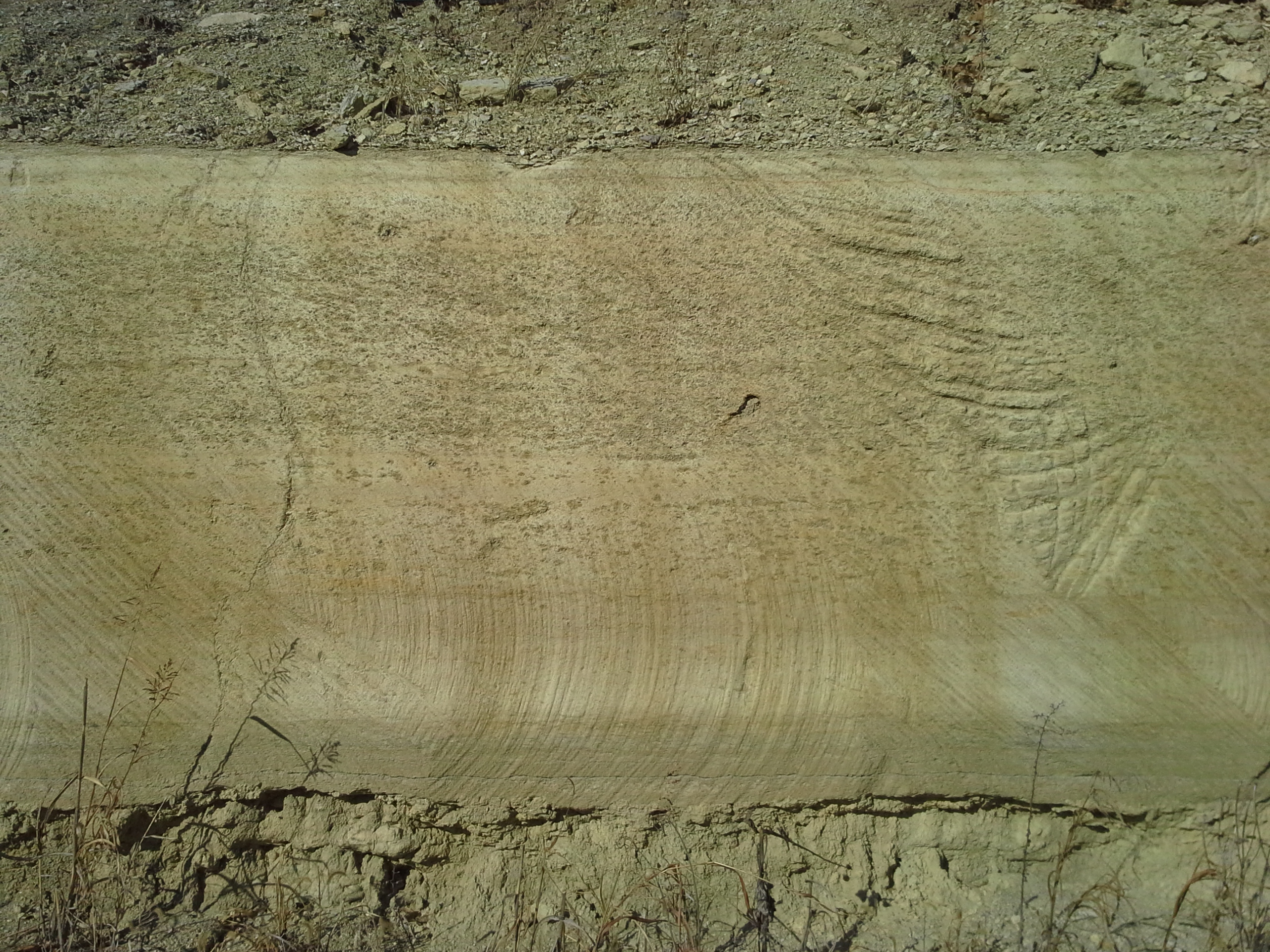
A recent (2006) trench-sawn, 6 foot thick exposure of Cottonwood Limestone, K-18 highway in west Manhattan, Kansas, showing the yellowish-gray or buff of fresh fractures. Just visible is the subtle variations in color, texture, and siliceous nodules between the upper and lower ledges

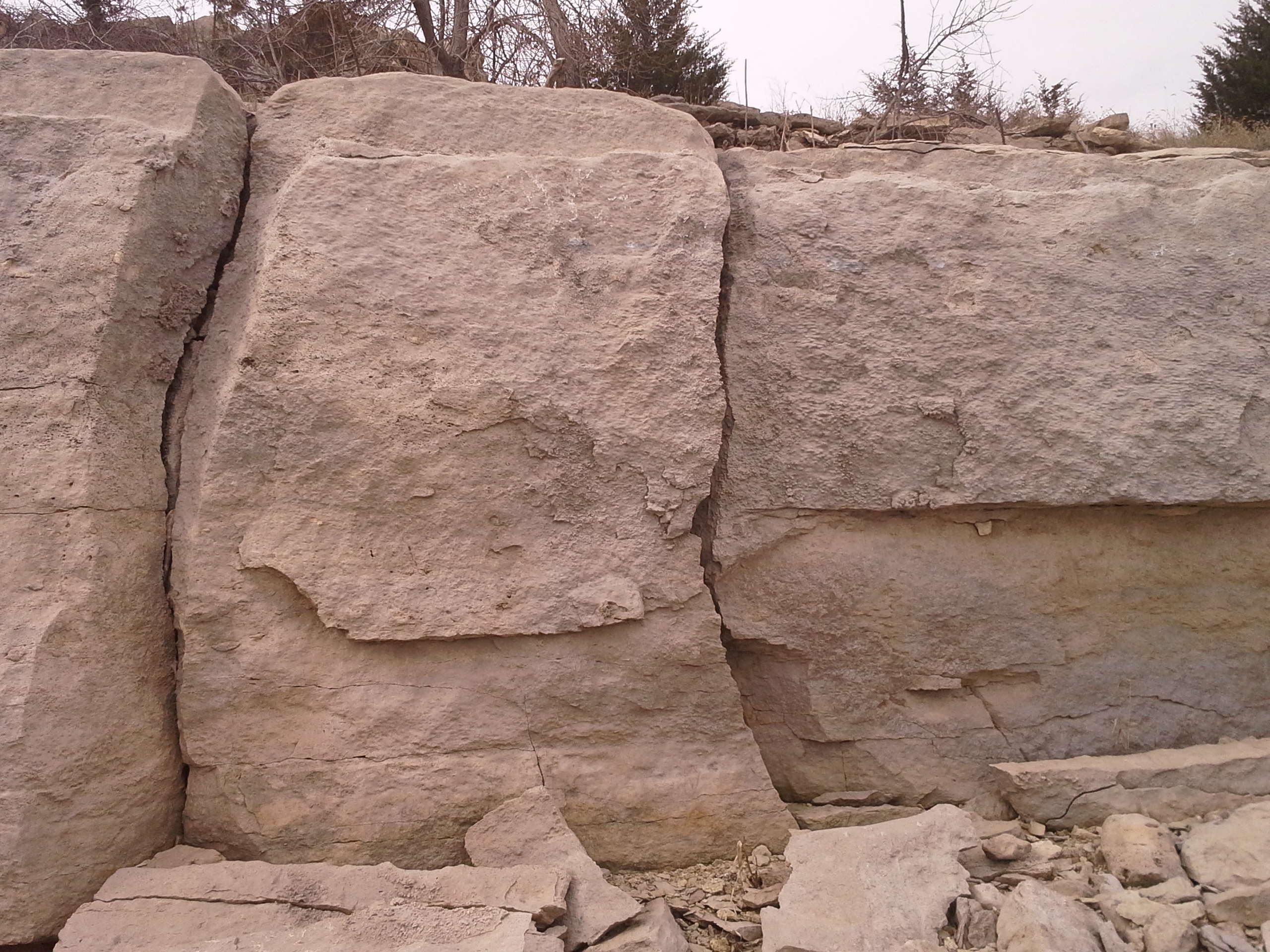
6 foot thick Cottonwood Limestone near the entrance to Tuttle Creek Cove campground, undercut by wave actions, fractured and exposed since the construction of the Tuttle Creek Lake. Note the visible line of parting between the top and bottom "ledges", and the subtle change in tone and texture.

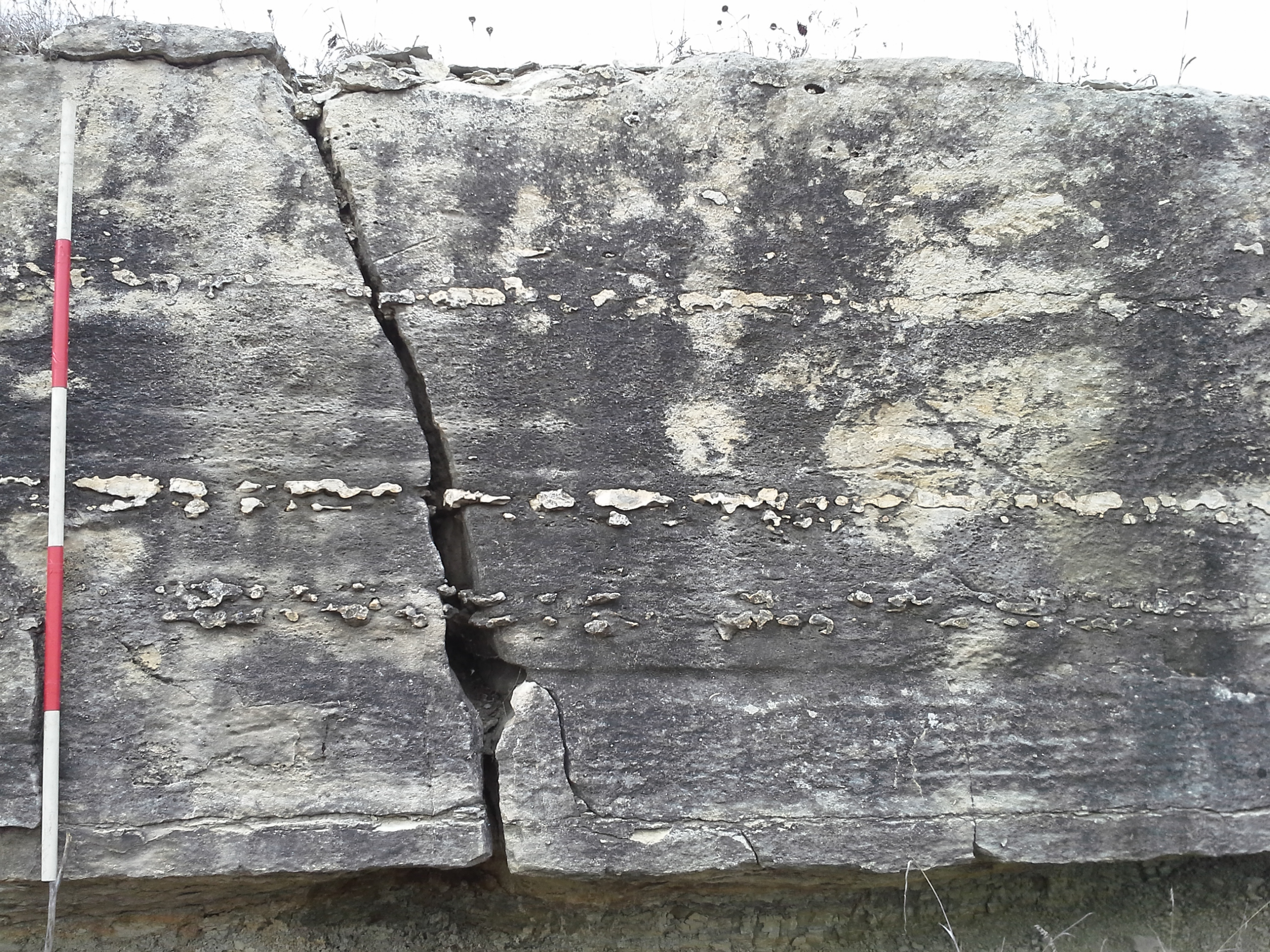
Cottonwood Limestone seen less than a mile east of Tuttle Creek Lake dam on K-113; showing the white to gray weathering and a history of subterranean dissolution along joints, highlighting the more resistant siliceous nodules.

The Cottonwood Limestone is a marine limestone and calcareous shale, laterally persistent, bench-forming, and notably and consistently showing abundant fossils. An outstanding example of uniformity of thickness over considerable areas, the outcrop of the Cottonwood Limestone over a distance of 150 miles from Nebraska to central Kansas is nowhere less than 5.5 nor more than 6.5 feet. The notable consistency of these characteristics within its range serves to make it a distinctive marker bed. Even so, there are some changes in lithologic character that can be seen from north to south.

In the central and north range, the limestone is recognized to have distinct the upper and lower beds, long known as Top Ledge and Bottom Ledge, which commonly part when weathered. This boundary between the upper and lower Cottonwood is evidenced by a sharp textural contrast, porosity difference, and changes in the opaque mineral content. In this range, the whole member is fine-grained limestone, but the Top Ledge has a yellower tint or a creamy gray with open grain while the Bottom Ledge is whiter with tight grain. With respect to fossil content, the upper weathering bed is characterized by the abundant Fusulinid assemblage, while the lower bed is composed of minute particles of various fragmented fossils, especially Osagia, echinoderms, and bryozoans.

In northern east-central Kansas, Cottonwood Limestone forms particularly prominent outcroppings in the Flint Hills, especially in the Cottonwood River valley in Chase County, Neosho River valley in Morris County, and the Kansas River and Big Blue River valleys of Riley County. There, it often forms a very conspicuous hillside bench characterized by massive light-gray rounded limestone blocks. The presence of the Cottonwood Limestone in a hillside here is often marked by a persistent line of shrubs that can be seen for many miles. Wherever seen in these and nearby valleys, the Cottonwood Limestone member is almost uniformly six feet thick. It is everywhere massive and commonly seems to consist of only one or two beds. The limestone on a fresh fracture is yellowish gray to buff in color, weathering to light gray. Fusulinids are common, especially in the upper part, and siliceous nodules project from weathered surfaces. Close observation removes any likelihood of confusing the Cottonwood Limestone with any other layer in this part of Kansas; its distinguishing characters are the massive ledge of uniform thickness, the silicified nodules, and the abundance of fusulinids, chiefly in the resistant upper part. The Cottonwood is not a flinty limestone such as those seen higher on the surrounding hilltops; however, nodules, concretions, and trace fossils (filled-in burrows) of partly to fully silicified material that weather more slowly than the rest of the member can give the limestone an appearance of containing flint.

While the abundance of fusulinids remains a characteristic of the top of the Cottonwood through to Osage County, Oklahoma, south of Chase County, Kansas the member has lost its massive limestone characteristic and does not form the conspicuous outcrops seen farther north. In Greenwood County, Kansas, the unit appears as light-gray limestone crowded with horizontal thin leaves of platy algae, attaining a maximum observed thickness of 8 feet. The Cottonwood in southern Kansas and northern Oklahoma is an interbedded limestone and calcareous shale with a very diverse, abundant, and well-preserved fossil fauna, especially brachiopods, mollusks, and ammodiscid foraminifera (shelly facies). At the southern limit of its outcrop the Cottonwood Limestone is a medium crystalline limestone with thin, shelly layers. Mollusks, Osagia, and quartz silt are common (silty Osagia facies).

A Range of Siliceous Nodules in the Cottonwood Limestone's Top Ledge
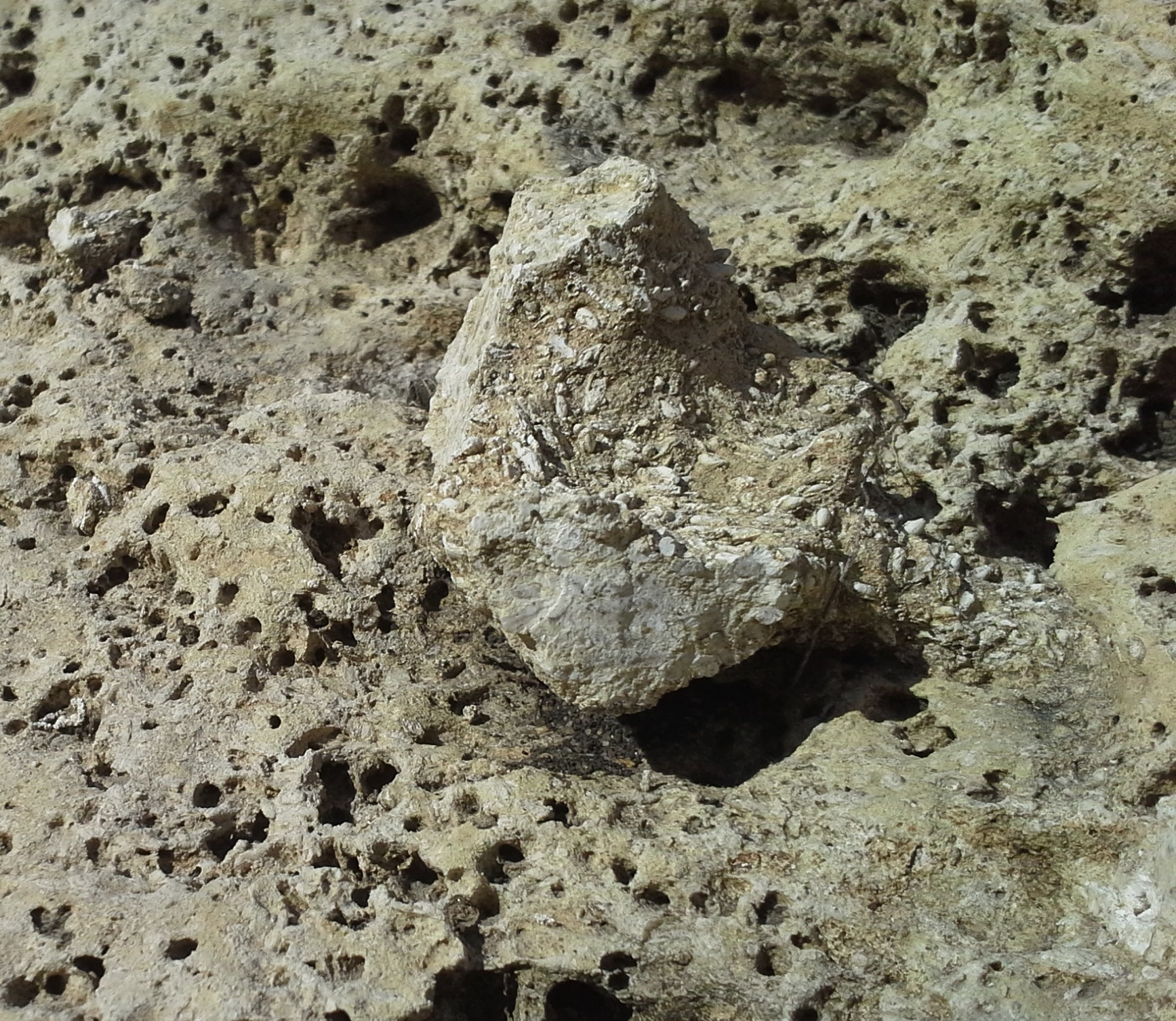
A protruding siliceous nodule, showing typical abundance of fusulinids.

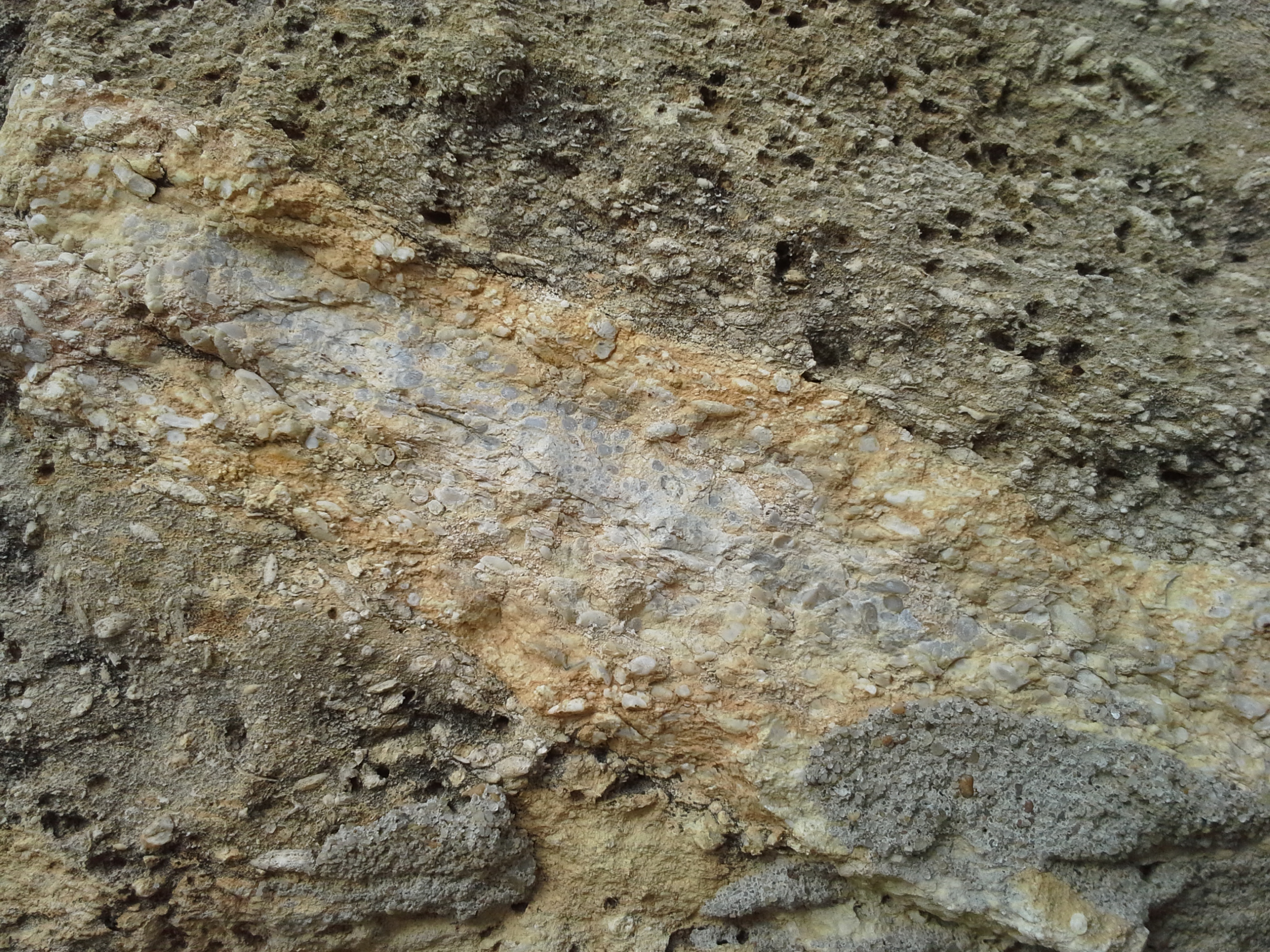
A longitudinal-section of siliceous nodule seen in split face blocks.

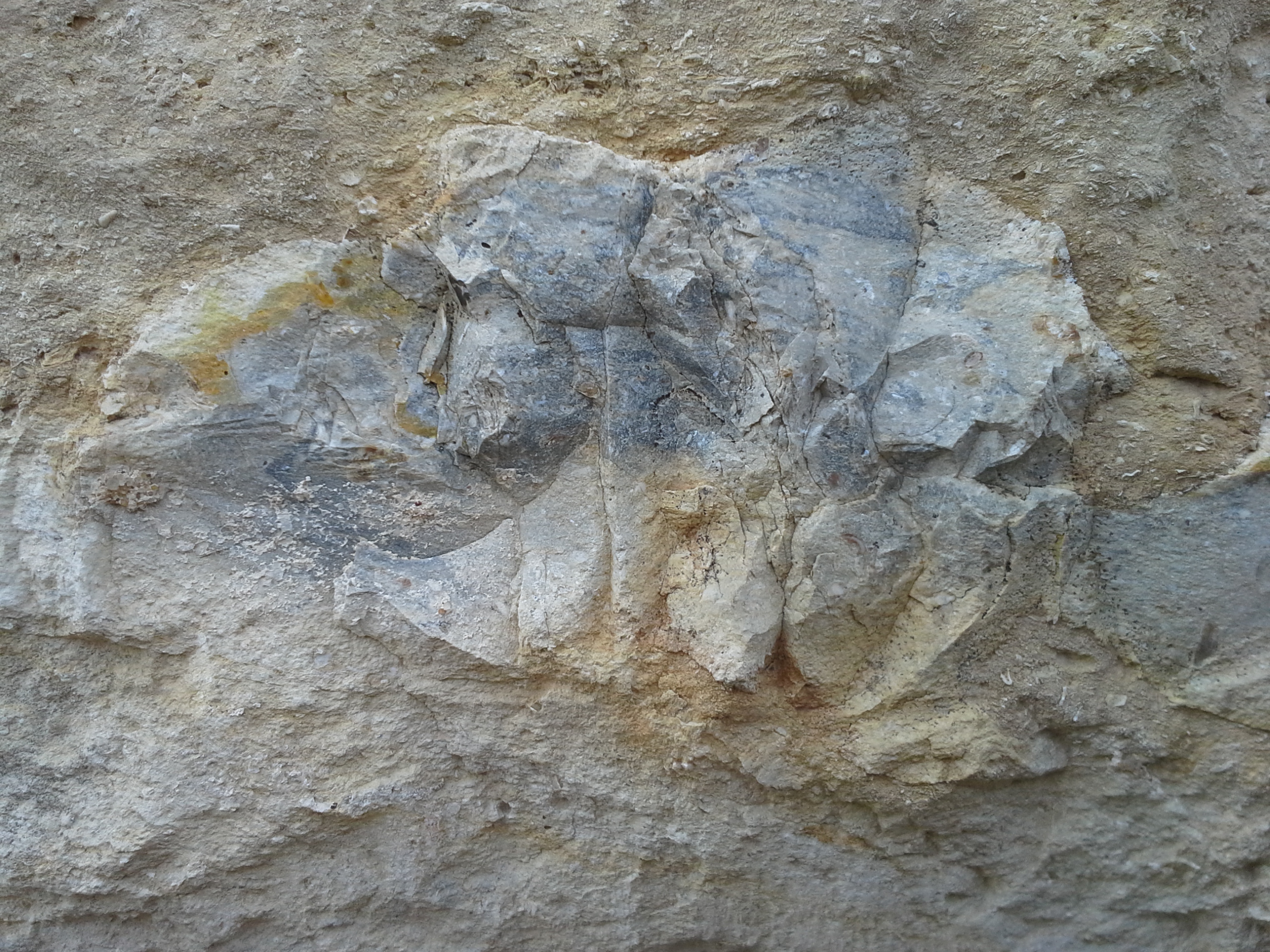
A cross-section of siliceous nodule (chalcedony), resembling the chalcedony flint found in higher limestones.

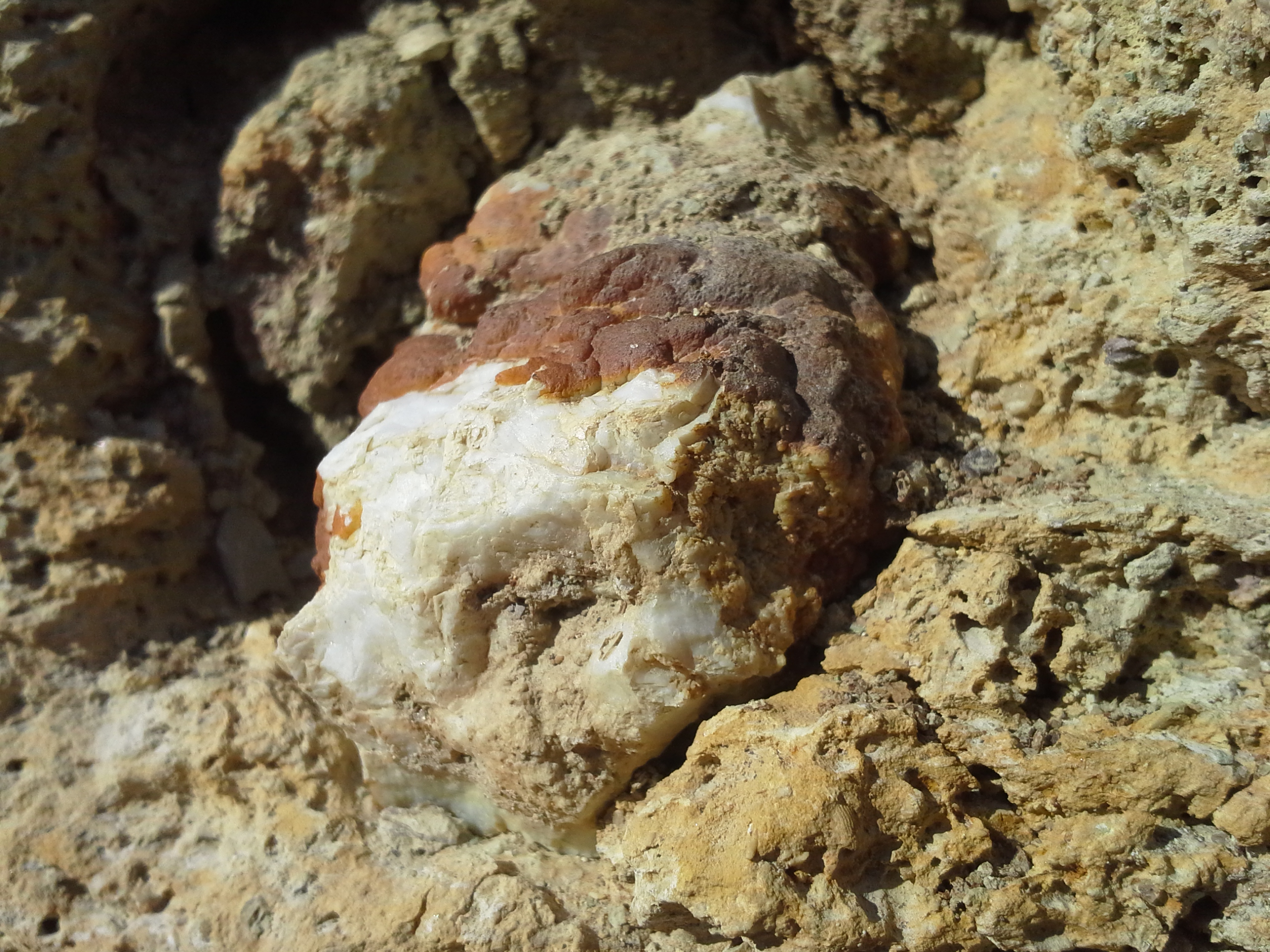
A crystalline quartz nodule.

== Paleoenvironment ==
Variations in the characteristic content and texture (facies) of the limestone reflect lateral changes in the environment from north to south.

- The northern and central bioclastic and fusuline facies of the Cottonwood were deposited in shallow, well-lit, moderately turbulent waters having only very small amounts of material washed in from land. Water circulation was variably restricted. Large amounts of sand-sized to granule-sized fusulinids, identified as Schwagerina are preserved, especially in the upper bed; Schubertella fusulinids are more common in the lower bed. Few animal fossils are present in the upper bed but somewhat more frequent in the lower bead, usually fragments or debris, including echinoderms, bryozoans, trilobites, ostracods, crinoids and occasional gastropods.
- Separating the central and the southern provinces was a broad shoal where the platy algal facies was deposited; here waters were moderately turbulent, well-lit, shallow, and somewhat restricted in circulation.
- The southern shelly ranges were deposited in a less turbulent and deeper-water environment, having good circulation and relatively large amounts of land-sourced material entering from the south supporting mollusks and sessile, filter-feeding brachiopods. The Osagia, an algal-foraminiferal intergrowth, and other encrusting algae beds in Oklahoma was formed in a shallower, more turbulent, nearer-shore environment marginal to the shelly facies.

== Access and viewing ==
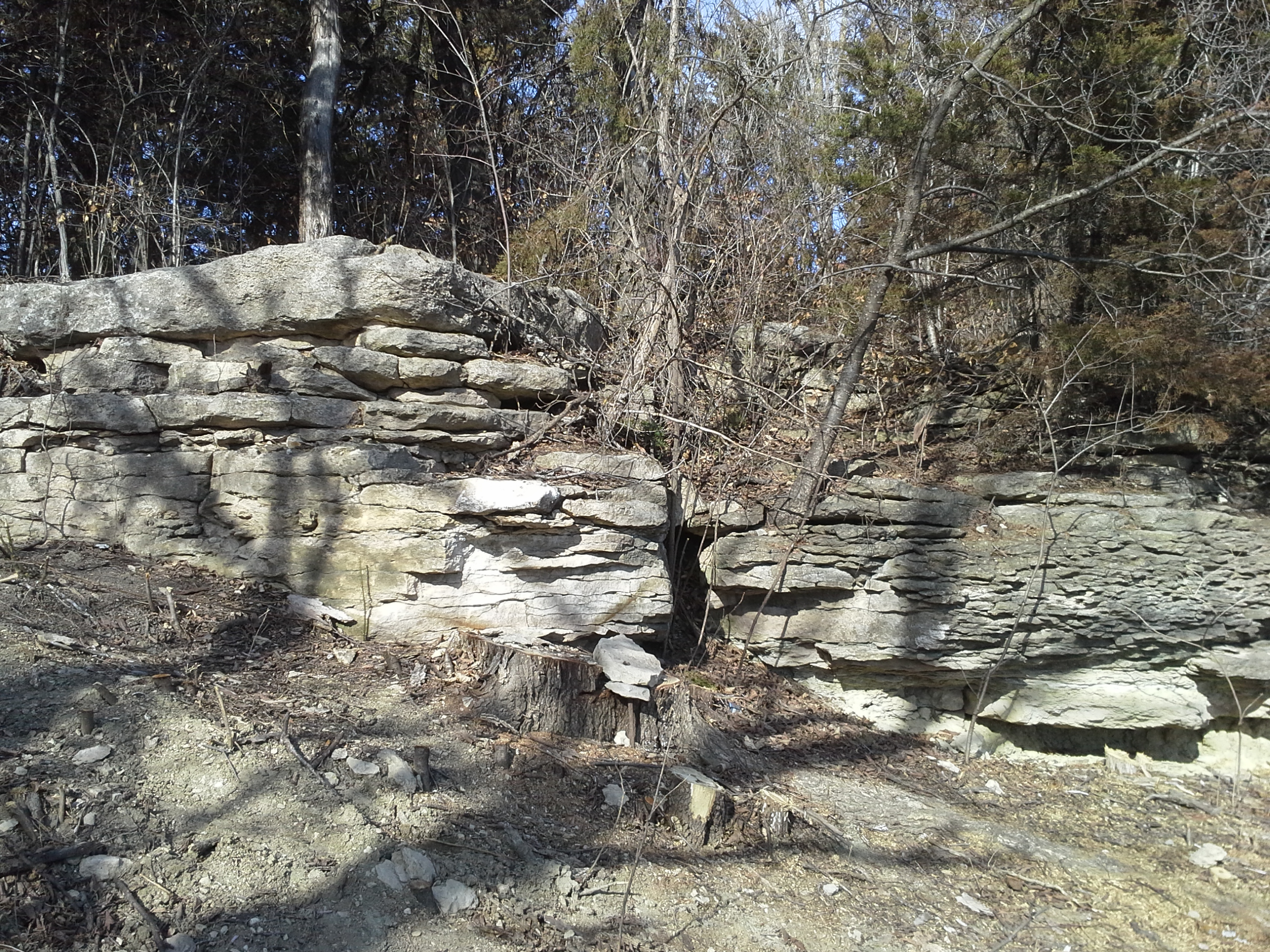
Cottonwood Limestone caps Bluemont Hill in Manhattan, Kansas. Seen here is a very weathered outcrop just above the landmark MANHATTAN letters.

The Cottonwood Limestone is easily accessed or viewed in several locations:

- On the Konza Prairie Nature Trail, as one climbs the trail from Kings Creek, the member forms the second bench. Here can be witnessed the characteristic line of boulders and shrubs that follow the rock layer around the hills. The characteristic springs can be found elsewhere on the trail feeding into Kings Creek.
- This limestone caps the landmark Bluemont Hill in Manhattan, Kansas, just above the white MANHATTAN letters. This location may be accessed through the Bluemont Scenic Overlook park. The parking lot and walkways at the overlook are generally just above the Eskridge Shale; most of the Cottonwood Limestone having been quarried off long ago. A remnant of the quarry face can be found east of the "Little Apple" water tower and a well-exposed, weathered outcropping is next to the stairs a short distance further along the gravel trail.
- This limestone is prominent on the bluffs lining the southern half of Tuttle Creek Lake where wave action has undercut the outcropping in several locations, exposing complete, less weathered faces. Here, a prominent and consistent outcropping visibly demonstrates the general Prairie Plains homocline that is characteristic of the surface sedimentary formations in the region. Near the dam, the layer is some 40 feet above the usual lake level, but from there it can be seen to very slowly slope below the water miles to the northwest.

== See also ==
- Fencepost limestone, state rock of Kansas
- List of fossiliferous stratigraphic units in Kansas
- List of fossiliferous stratigraphic units in Nebraska
- List of fossiliferous stratigraphic units in Oklahoma
- Paleontology in Kansas
- Paleontology in Nebraska
- Paleontology in Oklahoma
