= Sharps rifle =

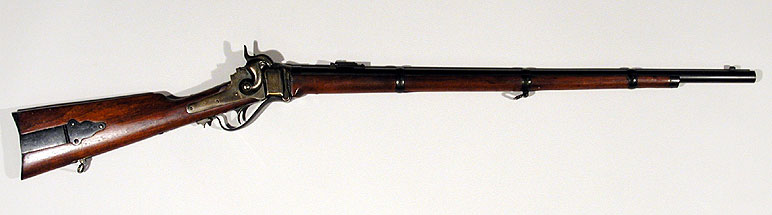
- Type: Falling-block rifle
- Place of origin: United States

Service history
- In service: 1850–1881
- Used by: United States; Confederate States; China; France; Argentina; Peru; Bolivia; Japan; United Kingdom; Australia; Canada; Mexico
- Wars: Sepoy Rebellion; Bleeding Kansas; American Civil War; Indian Wars; Fenian Raids; War of the Triple Alliance (Limited); Boshin War; Taiping Rebellion; Argentine Civil Wars; Franco-Prussian War; War of the Pacific; First Sino-Japanese War; Mexican Revolution; Second French intervention in Mexico

Production history
- Designer: Christian Sharps
- Designed: 1848
- Unit cost: $30 (1861)
- Produced: 1849–1881
- No. built: 120,000+
- Variants: Single set trigger (regular army); Double set trigger

Specifications
- Mass: 9.5 lb (4.3 kg)
- Length: 47 in (1,200 mm)
- Barrel length: 30 in (760 mm)
- Cartridge: .52-caliber (0.52" dia.) 475-grain (30.8 g) projectile with 50-grain (3.2 g) charge, later converted to .50-70 in 1867. The Model 1874 rifles and carbines were available in a variety of calibers, including .45-70, .45-110, and .45-120.
- Action: Falling block
- Rate of fire: 8–10 shots per minute
- Muzzle velocity: 1,200 ft/s (370 m/s)
- Effective firing range: 1,000 yd (910 m)
- Maximum firing range: 3,000 yd (2,700 m)
- Feed system: Breech-loading
- Sights: Open ladder type

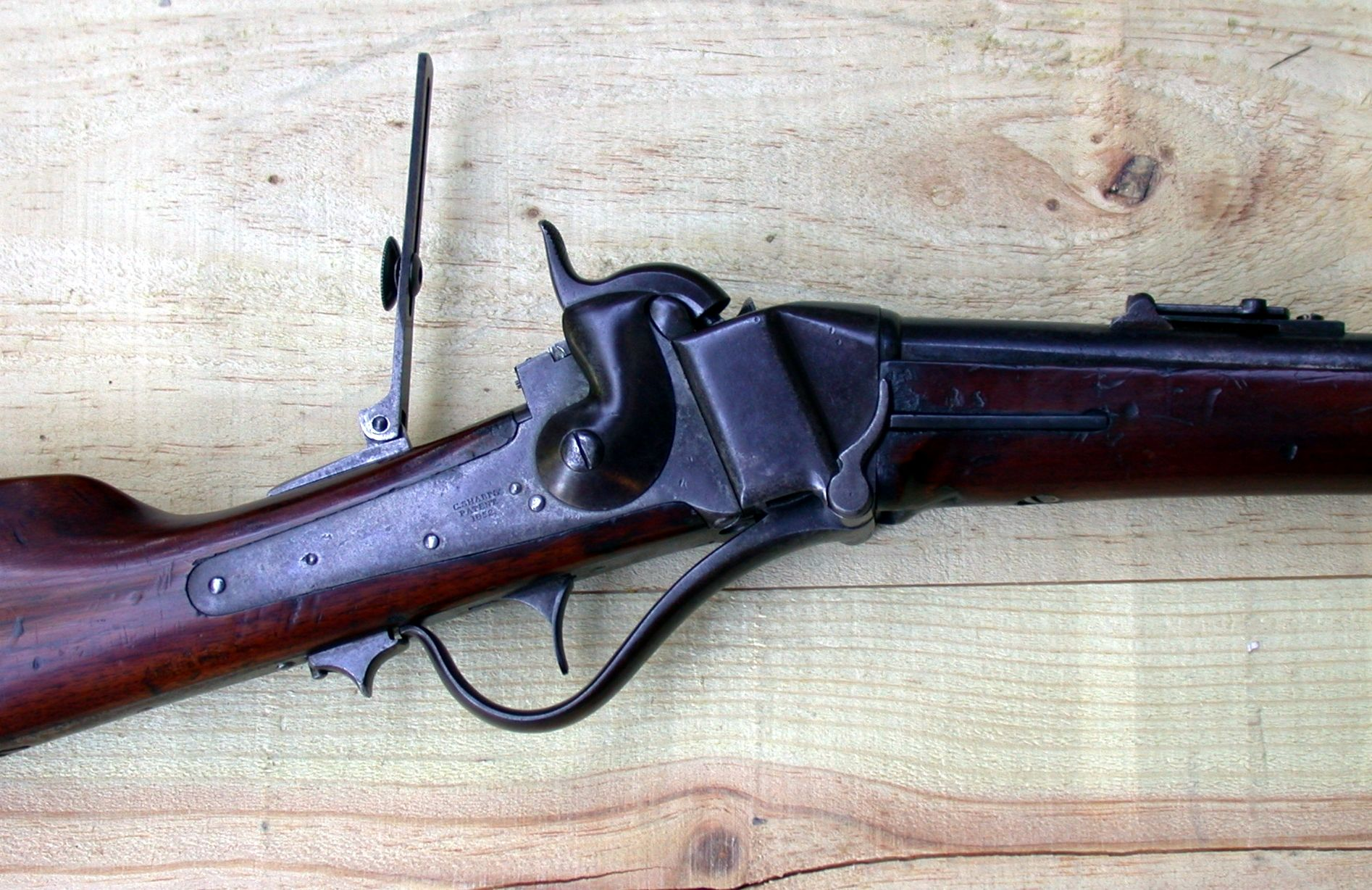
Sharps Model 1852 "slanting breech"

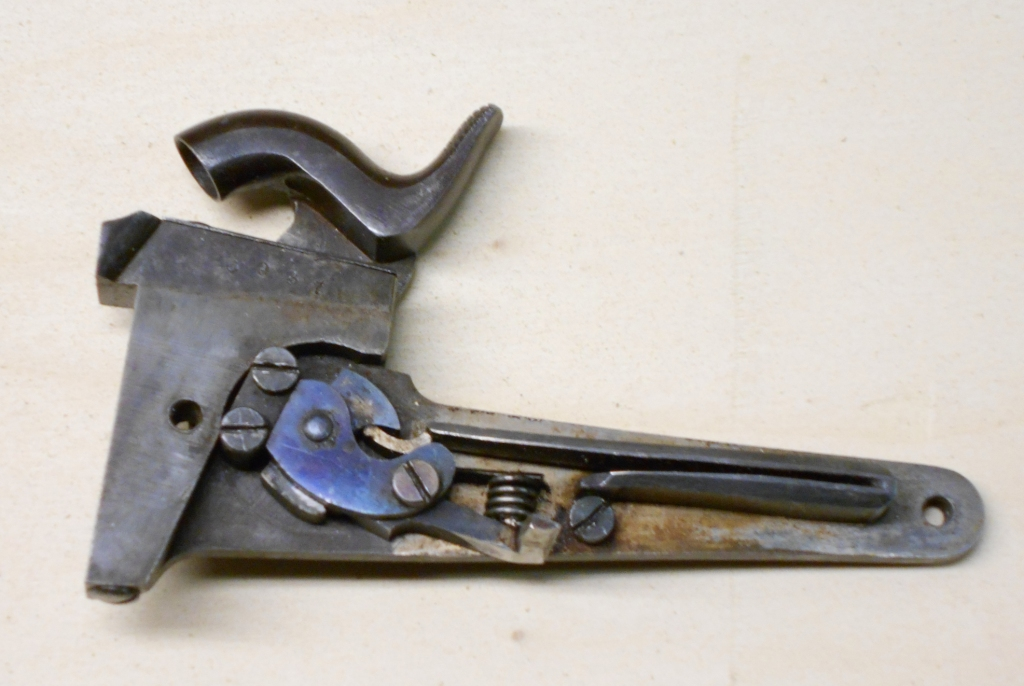
Sharps Model 1852, lock

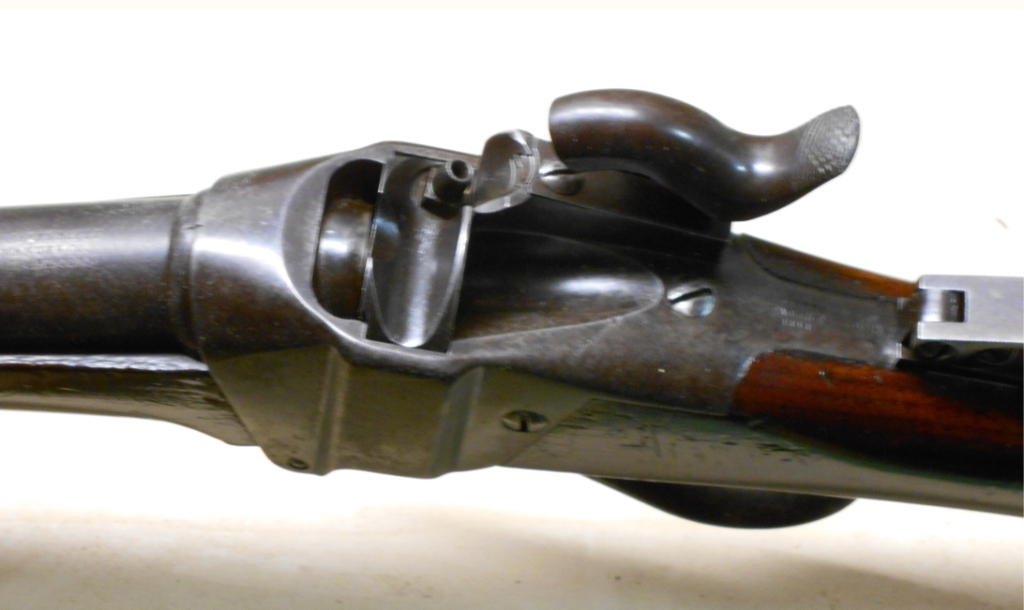
Sharps Model 1852, breech

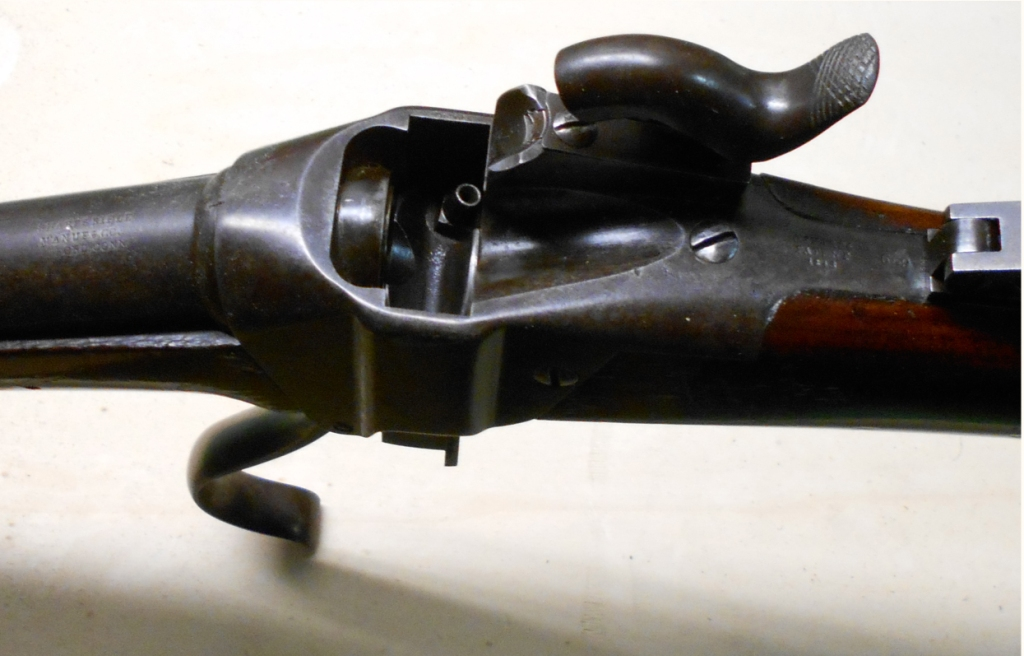
Sharps Model 1852, breech open

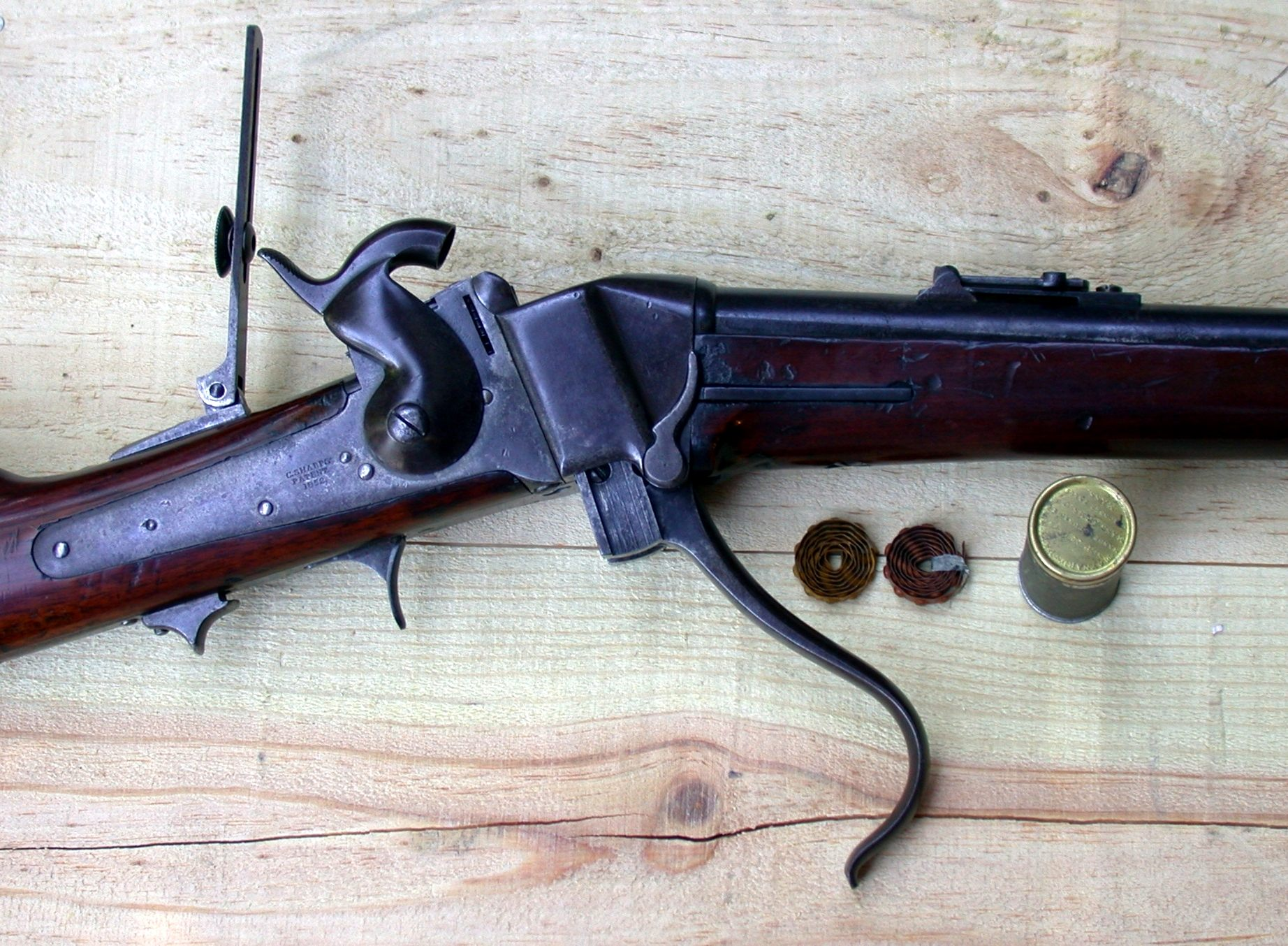
Sharps Model 1852 "slanting breech" carbine, under the forearm two primer-tapes

Sharps rifles are a series of large-bore, single-shot, falling-block, breech-loading rifles, beginning with a design by Christian Sharps in 1848 and ceasing production in 1881. They were renowned for long-range accuracy. By 1874, the rifle was available in a variety of calibers, and it was one of the few designs to be successfully adapted to metallic cartridge use. The Sharps rifles became icons of the American Old West with their appearances in many Western-genre films and books. Perhaps as a result, several rifle companies offer reproductions of the Sharps rifle.

== History ==
Sharps' initial rifle was patented September 12, 1848, and manufactured by A. S. Nippes at Mill Creek in Philadelphia, Pennsylvania, in 1850.

The second model used the Maynard tape primer, and surviving examples are marked Edward Maynard - Patentee 1845. In 1851, the second model was brought to the Robbins & Lawrence Company (R&L) of Windsor, Vermont, where the Model 1851 was developed for mass production. Rollin White of R&L invented the knife-edge breech block and self-cocking device for the "box-lock" Model 1851. This is referred to as the "first contract", which was for 10,000 Model 1851 carbines, of which approximately 1,650 were produced by R&L in Windsor.

In 1851, the "second contract" was made, for 15,000 rifles, and the Sharps Rifle Manufacturing Company was organized as a holding company with $1,000 in capital and with John C. Palmer as president, Christian Sharps as engineer, and Richard S. Lawrence as master armorer and superintendent of manufacturing. Sharps was to be paid a royalty of $1 per firearm, and the factory was built on R&L's property in Hartford, Connecticut.

The Model 1851 was replaced in production by the Model 1853. Christian Sharps left the company in 1855 to form his own manufacturing company called "C. Sharps & Company" in Philadelphia; Lawrence continued as the chief armorer until 1872 and developed the various Sharps models and their improvements that made the rifle famous. In 1874, the company was reorganized and renamed the "Sharps Rifle Company," and it remained in Hartford until 1876, whereupon it relocated to Bridgeport, Connecticut.

The Sharps rifle played a prominent role in the Bleeding Kansas conflict during the 1850s, particularly in the hands of anti-slavery forces. The Sharps rifles supplied to anti-slavery factions earned the name "Beecher's Bibles", after the famed abolitionist Henry Ward Beecher.

The Model 1874 Sharps (this model had been in production since 1871) was a particularly popular rifle that led to the introduction of several derivatives in quick succession. It handled a large number of .40 to .50 caliber cartridges in a variety of loadings and barrel lengths. Hugo Borchardt designed the Sharps-Borchardt Model 1878, the last rifle made by the Sharps Rifle Co. before its closing in 1881.

Reproductions of the paper cartridge Sharps Model 1859 and Model 1863 rifle and carbine, the metallic-cartridge Model 1874 Sharps rifle, and Sharps-Borchardt Model 1878 have been manufactured for use in Civil War re-enacting, hunting, and target shooting.

== Military use ==
=== Rifle ===
The military Sharps rifle was produced by the Sharps Rifle Manufacturing Company and is a falling-block rifle used during and after the American Civil War in multiple variations. Along with being able to use a standard percussion cap, the Sharps has an unusual pellet primer feed. This is a device which holds a stack of pelleted primers and flips one over the nipple each time the trigger is pulled and the hammer falls—making it much easier to fire a Sharps from horseback than a gun employing individually loaded percussion caps. It mounted saber bayonets were distinctive weapons, primarily as attachments for the Sharps M1859 rifle.

It was used in the Civil War by multiple Union units, most famously by the U.S. Army marksmen known popularly as "Berdan's Sharpshooters" in honor of their leader, Hiram Berdan. The Sharps rifle made a superior sniper weapon of greater accuracy than the more commonly issued muzzle-loading rifled muskets. This was attributed to the higher rate of fire of the breech loading mechanism and superior quality of manufacture, as well as the ease with which it could be reloaded from a kneeling or prone position.

The Sharps infantry rifles that were captured were M1859 falling-block rifles manufactured by the Union, seized from federal forces, processed in Confederate ordnance depots, and then reassigned to Southern units; this practice, documented by Steven W. Knott, involved marking the captured weapons with a single inspector character, such as an 'S' on the stock, after performing the necessary maintenance and repairs to redistribute them.

At this time however, many officers were distrustful of breech-loading weapons on the grounds that they would encourage men to waste ammunition. In addition, the Sharps rifle was expensive to manufacture (three times the cost of a muzzle-loading Springfield rifle) and so only 11,000 of the Model 1859s were produced. Most were unissued or given to sharpshooters, but the 13th Pennsylvania Reserves (which still carried the old-fashioned designation of a "rifle regiment") carried them until being mustered out in 1864.

=== Carbine ===
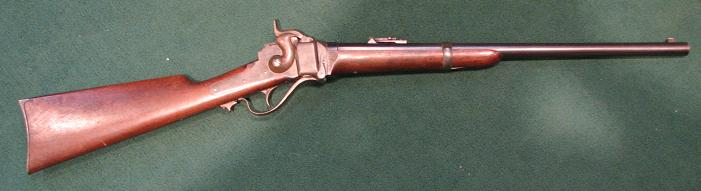
Original 1863 carbine in .50-70 Government

The carbine version was very popular with the cavalry of both the Union and Confederate armies, with 80,512 purchased by the US Ordnance Department between 1 January 1861 and 30 June 1866.. The falling-block action lent itself to conversion to the new metallic cartridges developed in the late 1860s, and many of these converted carbines in .50-70 Government were used during the Indian Wars in the decades immediately following the Civil War.

Some Civil War–issue carbines have an unusual feature: a hand-cranked grinder in the stock. Although long thought to be a coffee mill, experimentation with some of the few survivors suggests the grinder is ill-suited for coffee. The modern consensus is that its true purpose was for grinding corn or wheat or, more appropriately, for grinding charcoal needed in the production of black powder.

Unlike the Sharps rifle, the carbine was very popular, and almost 90,000 were produced. By 1863, it was the most common weapon carried by Union cavalry regiments, although in 1864 many were replaced by seven-shot Spencer carbines. Some Sharps clones were produced by the Confederates in Richmond. Quality was generally poorer, and they normally used brass fittings instead of iron. One such example is the S.C. Robinson Carbine, which is a Confederate-produced replica of the Sharps rifle.

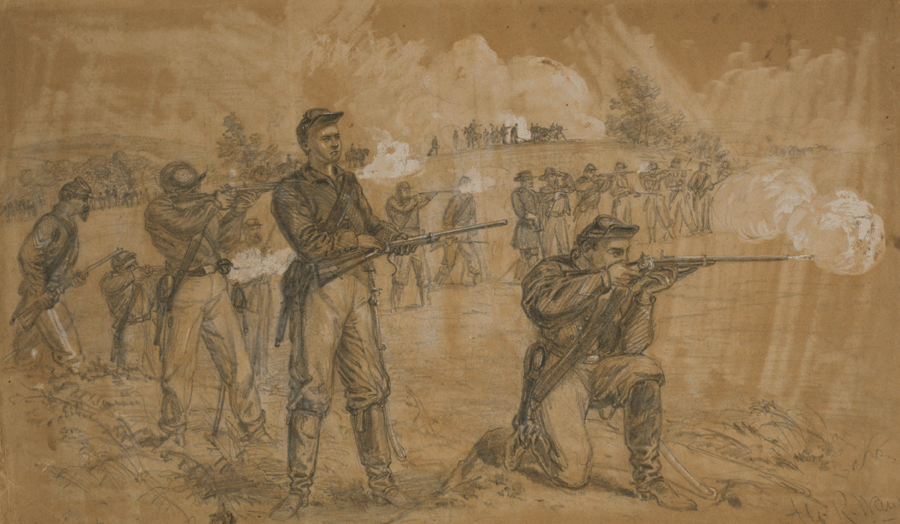
Alfred Waud painting showing men of the 1st Maine Cavalry with Sharps carbines during the Battle of Middleburg. The kneeling man fires at the enemy, as the man standing behind him is feeding a new cartridge into the chamber.

The British purchased 1,000 Model 1852 carbines in 1855 which were later used in the Indian Rebellion of 1857.

Captain Richard "Old Baldy" Ewell praised the Sharps rifle as the best firearm for cavalry, citing its superior range and accuracy compared to the Springfield Model 1847 musketoon. He argued that the weapon was stronger, allowing soldiers to last longer in the field, and noted that Dragoons had significantly more confidence in its effectiveness than in other arms like the Colt revolver or Minie rifle.

== Sporting rifles ==
Sharps made sporting versions from the late 1840s until the early 1880s. After the American Civil War, converted army surplus rifles were made into custom firearms, and the Sharps factory produced Models 1869 and 1874 in large numbers for commercial buffalo hunters and frontiersmen. These large-bore rifles were manufactured with some of the most powerful black powder cartridges ever made. Sharps also fabricated special long-range target versions for the popular Creedmoor style of 1,000-yard (910 m) target shooting. Many modern black powder cartridge silhouette shooters use original and replica Sharps rifles to target metallic silhouettes cut in the shapes of animals at ranges up to 500 metres (550 yd). Shiloh Rifle Manufacturing Company and C Sharps Arms of Big Timber, Montana, have been manufacturing reproductions of the Sharps rifle since 1983, respectively.

== Rifle cartridges ==
Between 1871 and 1880, Sharps rifles were chambered in 15 different cartridges that had bore diameters of .40, .44, .45, and .50 inches with either a bottleneck or straight-walled case. These cartridges included the .40-1 5/8 Bottleneck (.40-50 Sharps Bottleneck), .40-1 7/8 Straight (.40-50 Sharps Straight), .40-2 1/4 Bottleneck (.40-70 Sharps Bottleneck), .40-2 1/2 Straight (.40-70 Sharps Bottleneck), .40-2 5/8 Bottleneck (.40-90 Sharps Bottleneck), .44-1 5/8 (.44-60 Sharps), .44-2 1/4 (.44-77 Sharps or Remington), .44-2 5/8 (.44-90 Sharps), .45-2 1/10 (.45-70 Government), .45-2 4/10 (.45-90 Sharps or Winchester), .45-2 6/10 (.45-100 Sharps), .45-2 7/8 (.45-110 Sharps), .50-1 3/4 (.50-70 Government), .50-2.00 (No Modern Equivalent), and .50-2 1/2 (.50-90 Sharps).

== In popular culture ==
In 1990, the Western film Quigley Down Under, Tom Selleck's title character uses a Sharps rifle chambered in the .45-110, also known as the 45-2 7/8" Sharps. Theater Crafts Industry went so far as to say, "In Quigley Down Under, which we did in 1990, the Sharps rifle practically co-stars with Tom Selleck." This statement was echoed by gunwriters including John Taffin in Guns and Lionel Atwill in Field & Stream, crediting the film with an impact to rival that of Dirty Harry on the Smith & Wesson Model 29 chambered in .44 Remington Magnum.

Burt Lancaster's character Valdez in the movie Valdez Is Coming (1971) uses a Sharps rifle with deadly results at almost 1,000 yards (910 m). Also, in the western Billy Two Hats (1974), David Huddleston's character Copeland wounds Gregory Peck's character, Archie Deans, at a far distance. Likewise, in 1986's Young Guns, Doc Scurlock (Kiefer Sutherland) carries a Sharps 1874 Cavalry Carbine as his primary weapon. The character LaBoeuf carries a Sharps Rifle in film adaptations of the 1968 novel True Grit by Charles Portis. In the Coen Brothers adaptation True Grit (2010), Texas Ranger LaBoeuf, played by Matt Damon, carries a Pedersoli-made 1874 Sharps Cavalry Carbine in .45-70 Government, famously praising it as "an instrument of uncanny balance and precision". A Sharps buffalo rifle was also featured in the 1969 film version, True Grit (1969).

Firearms manufacturers such as Davide Pedersoli and Shiloh Rifle Manufacturing Company have credited these movies with an increase in demand for those rifles. As a result of the popularity of the film, a Sharps match is held annually in Forsyth, Montana, known as the "Matthew Quigley Buffalo Rifle Match". Originally, a 44-inch (1.1 m) target was placed at 1,000 yards (910 m) for each shooter, reminiscent of a scene from the movie. The match is billed as the "biggest rifle event shooting in Eastern Montana since the Custer Massacre" and has since developed into a two-day competition with eight shots for score on six steel silhouette targets at ranges from 350 to 805 yards (320 to 736 m).

In a semi-biographical 2019 novel by Russ Brown titled Miss Chisum, the Sharps M1851 Boxlock is featured as the prize in a shooting competition in Paris, Texas. It is won by the notorious Texas Ranger, William 'Bigfoot' Wallace, who goes on to become the mentor to the young cattle baron, John Chisum. Later in the novel Wallace comes to Chisum's rescue in a gunfight in San Antonio, resolving the matter with the Sharps.

== See also ==
- .50-90 Sharps
- Billy Dixon, Medal of Honor recipient at the Second Battle of Adobe Walls
- Rifles in the American Civil War
