= Beecher's Bibles =

Nickname of a type of American rifle

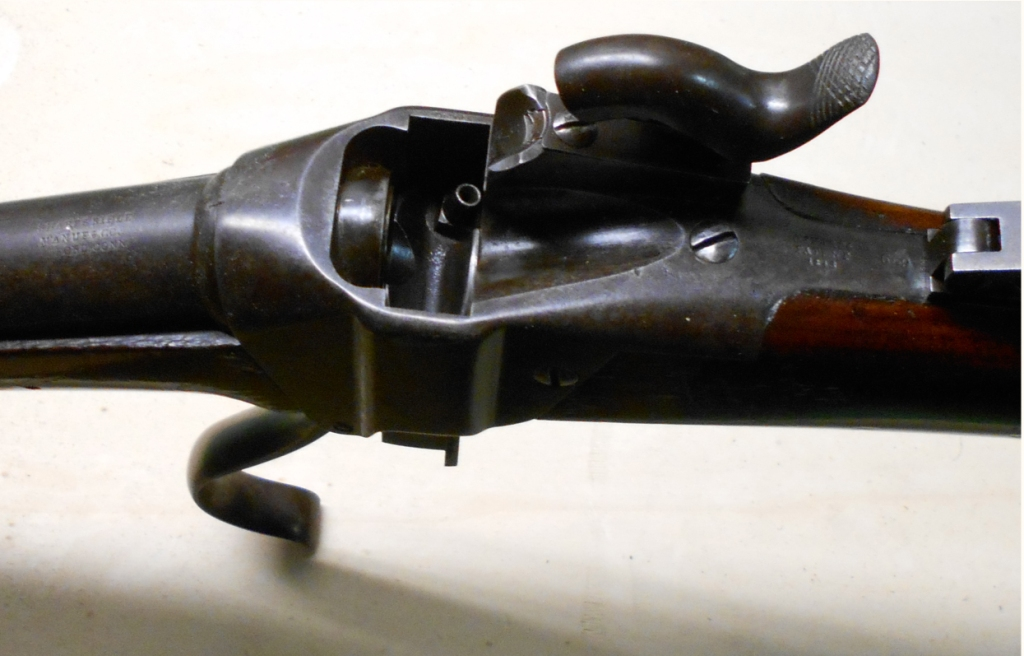
A Sharps Model 1852, nearly the same as Model 1853. The breech is open, waiting for a bullet to be loaded directly into the barrel. The hammer strikes a percussion cap at the round nipple igniting black powder in the paper cartridge. Demonstration video.

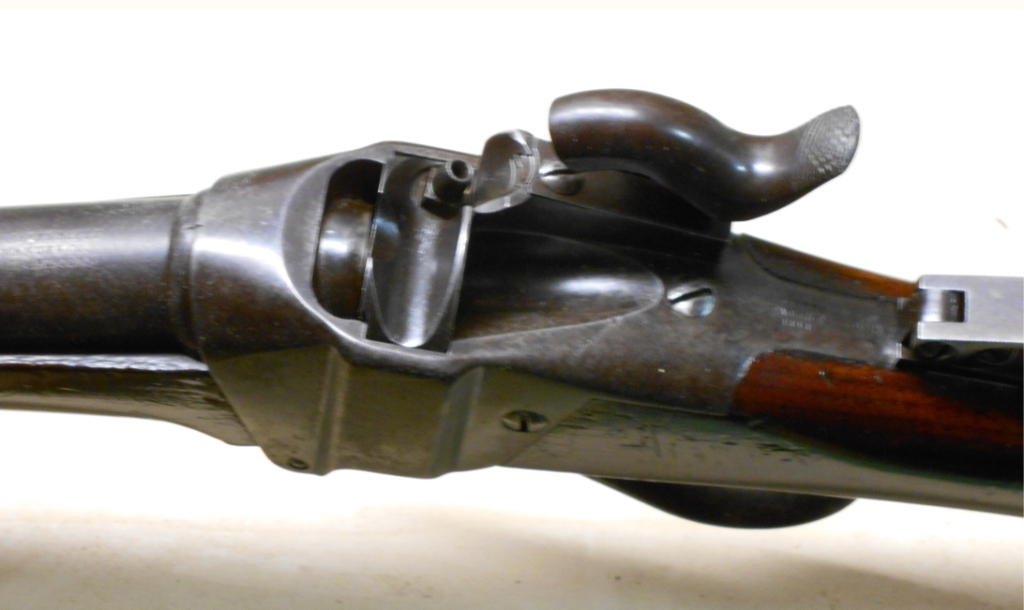
Breech closed, ready to fire. Most guns at this time were muzzle loading which took much longer to operate.

"Beecher's Bibles" was the name given to the breech-loading Sharps rifle that were supplied to and used by the anti-slavery settlers and combatants in Kansas, during the Bleeding Kansas period (1854–1860).

== Background ==
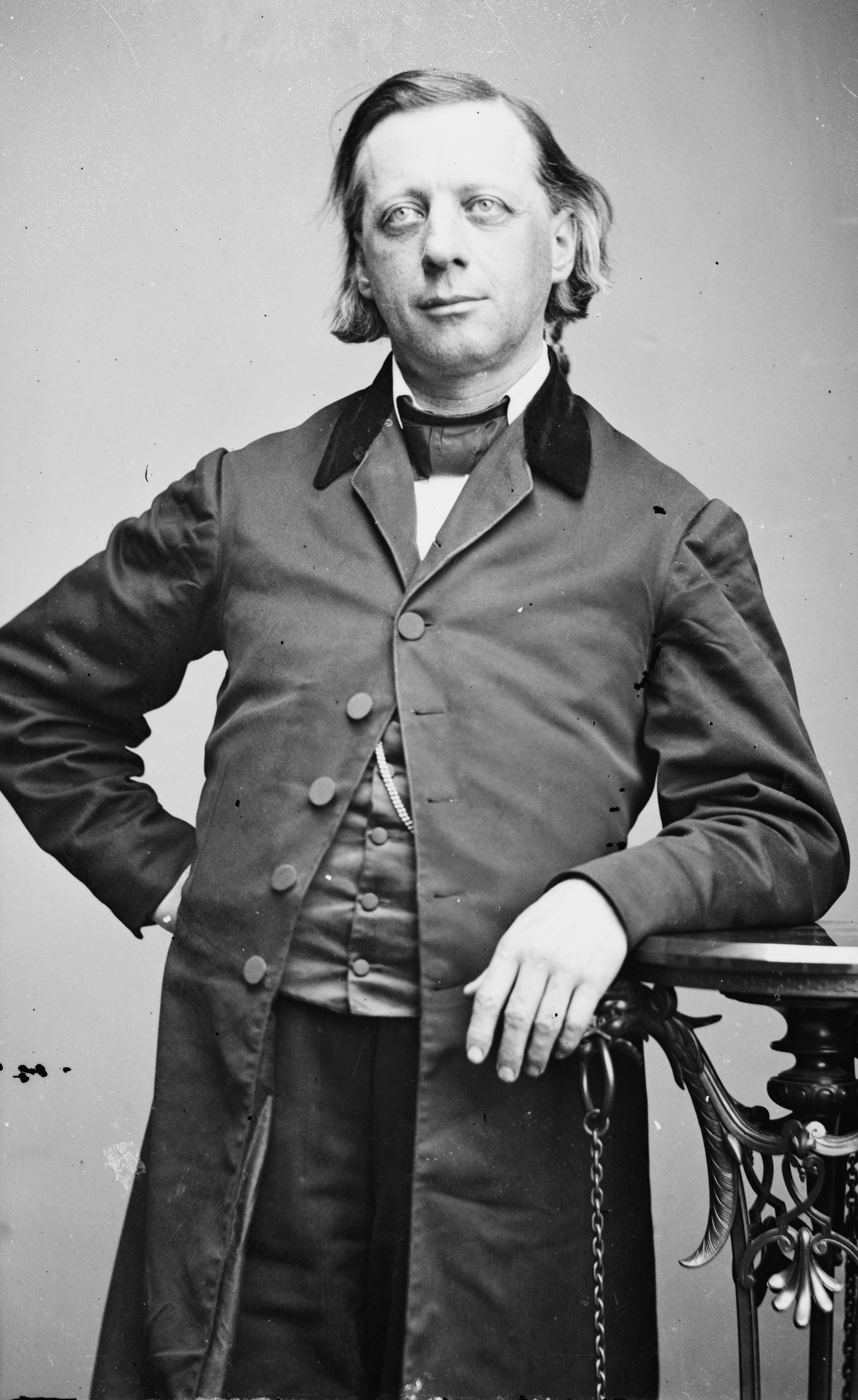
Henry Ward Beecher, between 1855 and 1865

For decades, there had been conflict between pro-slavery and anti-slavery activists in America, particularly when a territory was admitted into the Union as a new state. Fault lines arose over the question if it would be a free state, or a slave state. When in 1820 Missouri was admitted into the Union the controversy was settled with the Missouri Compromise, which said all future states south of Missouri could be admitted as slave states.

During the 1854 formation of two new states, Kansas and Nebraska, Congress repealed the Missouri Compromise and initiated the Kansas–Nebraska Act, saying rather the citizens within each territory could decide by popular vote. Settlers streamed into Kansas to stack the vote, many pro-slavers coming from neighboring Missouri.

Violence was rife in Kansas between the two sides. Various groups and individuals began sending weapons to support the anti-slavery "free-staters". These included Frederick Law Olmsted, Samuel Cabot, the National Kansas Committee, the Massachusetts Kansas Committee, the New England Emigrant Aid Company, the state of Iowa, as well as individual smugglers such as David S. Hoyt who was later captured and killed by pro-slavery men in Missouri.

== History ==
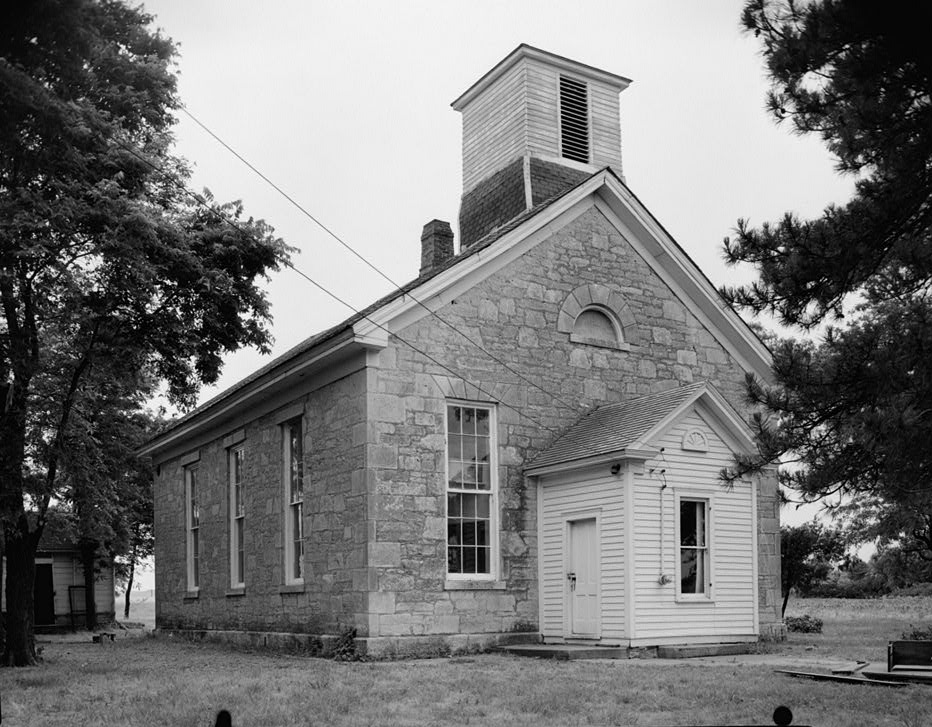
Beecher Bible and Rifle Church

The name "Beecher's Bibles" is in reference to Sharps rifles and carbines, associated with the New England minister and abolitionist Henry Ward Beecher, of the New England Emigrant Aid Society. Beecher was an outspoken abolitionist and he raised funds from his congregation to buy Sharps carbines for Kansas. While federal and state authorities had forbidden sending arms to the territory, that did not stop abolitionists from donating funds for firearm purchases to aid free state fighters. Approximately 900 Sharps Carbines were sent to the Kansas conflict.

The Sharps Carbine Model 1853 was not a cheap or common rifle: it had a state of the art design incorporating a breech loading mechanism, that made it particularly advantageous against the weapons of pro-slavers. W. H. Isley wrote of the rifle in 1907, saying,

The very name 'Sharps rifle' was to become a term to sober the border ruffian and give him serious pause. This breech-loading rifle was a new invention and extremely effective in comparison, the Missourian was poorly armed, carrying either a squirrel-knife, a heavy buffalo-gun, or a clumsy army musket. This difference in armament probably explains why the free-state bands, though usually outnumbered, were invariably victorious in all open fighting.

There are a number of origin stories for the name "Beecher's Bibles". As traditionally told, it involves concealment. The carbines were shipped at the bottom of wooden crates covered in bibles. The crates were marked with "Books and Bibles", to not raise suspicion with pro-slavers. There are similar stories of guns in an unlabeled box with bibles in a separate box. However, according to the journal Kansas History, there is nothing in the literature to support the concealment narrative.

Rather, Beecher and his New York congregation sent a check for $625, meant for the purchase of Sharps files, along with 25 bibles, to a group of Connecticut emigrants headed to colonize Kansas. Beecher also included a letter and asked the group's leader, Charles Lines, to publicize it. This letter was published in newspapers, and in this way "Beecher", "Guns" and "Bibles" became associated in the public's mind. Newspaper headlines proclaimed "Bibles and Rifles for Kansas" and "Beecher Bible and Rifle Colony". Some newspapers began calling Beecher's church the "Bible and Rifle Company".

According to a letter written years later by Beecher himself:

The letter that accompanied the check and the Bibles [sent to Charles Lines] was widely reprinted in newspapers across the country under the headline, BIBLES AND RIFLES FOR KANSAS and BIBLES AND RIFLES IN KANZAS. It was from these events that the company began to be referred to as the "Beecher Bible and Rifle Colony" and the Sharps rifle took on the nickname "Beecher’s Bible".

== Bibliography ==
- Marcot, Roy; Marron, Edward; Paxton, Ron (2019). Sharps Firearms: The Percussion Era 1848–1865. Northwood Heritage Press.
