= Florena Shale =

Fossiliferous shale unit in Kansas, USA

- Stratigraphic range: Asselian (Gearyan stage)
- Type: Formation Member
- Unit of: Beattie Limestone
- Underlies: Morrill Limestone of the Beattie Limestone formation
- Overlies: Cottonwood Limestone of the Beattie Limestone formation

Lithology
- Primary: Shale

Location
- Region: mid-continental
- Country: United States

Type section
- Named for: Florena, Kansas (Marshall County)

The Florena Shale is a stratigraphic unit in east-central Kansas, northeast-central Oklahoma, and southeastern Nebraska in the Midwestern United States. It preserves fossils dating to the Early Permian period.

== See also ==
- List of fossiliferous stratigraphic units in Kansas
- List of fossiliferous stratigraphic units in Nebraska
- List of fossiliferous stratigraphic units in Oklahoma
- Paleontology in Kansas
- Paleontology in Nebraska
- Paleontology in Oklahoma
