= Beattie Formation =

Geologic formation in the United States

- Stratigraphic range: Lower Permian
- Type: Formation
- Unit of: Council Grove Group
- Sub-units: Morrill Limestone; Florena Shale; Cottonwood Limestone
- Underlies: Stearns Shale
- Overlies: Eskridge Shale

Lithology
- Primary: Limestone, Shale

Location
- Region: mid-continental
- Country: United States
- Extent: outcrops from southeast Nebraska to northeast-central Oklahoma

Type section
- Named for: Beattie, Kansas
- Named by: Condra, G.E., and Busby, C.E.
- Year defined: 1933

The Beattie Formation, or Beattie Limestone, is a geologic formation in east-central Kansas, northeast-central Oklahoma, and southeastern Nebraska in the Midwestern United States. It preserves fossils dating to the Permian period.

== See also ==
- List of fossiliferous stratigraphic units in Kansas
- List of fossiliferous stratigraphic units in Nebraska
- List of fossiliferous stratigraphic units in Oklahoma
- Paleontology in Kansas
- Paleontology in Nebraska
- Paleontology in Oklahoma
