= Morrill Limestone =

Stratigraphic unit in the United States

- Stratigraphic range: Lower Permian
- Type: Formation Member
- Unit of: Beattie Limestone
- Underlies: Stearns Shale
- Overlies: Florena Shale of the Beattie Limestone formation

Lithology
- Primary: Shale

Location
- Region: mid-continental
- Country: United States

The Morrill Limestone is a stratigraphic unit in east-central Kansas, northeast-central Oklahoma, and southeastern Nebraska in the Midwestern United States. It preserves fossils dating to the Permian period.

== See also ==
- List of fossiliferous stratigraphic units in Kansas
- List of fossiliferous stratigraphic units in Nebraska
- List of fossiliferous stratigraphic units in Oklahoma
- Paleontology in Kansas
- Paleontology in Nebraska
- Paleontology in Oklahoma
