= Wabaunsee, Kansas =

Unincorporated community in Wabaunsee County, Kansas

- CDP
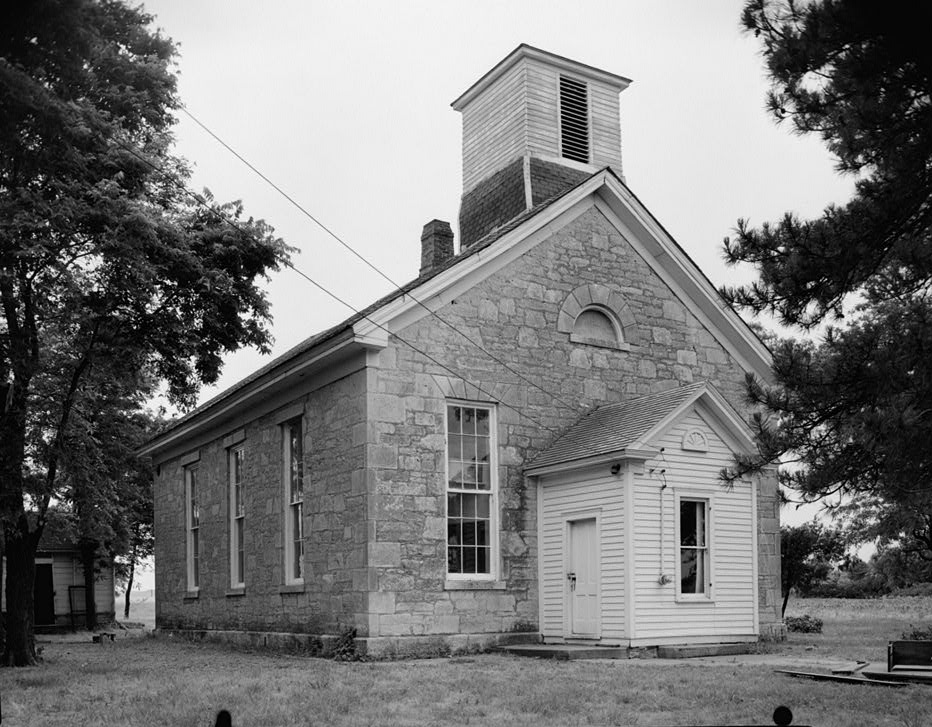
- Beecher Bible and Rifle Church, located at the southeast corner of Chapel and Elm Streets

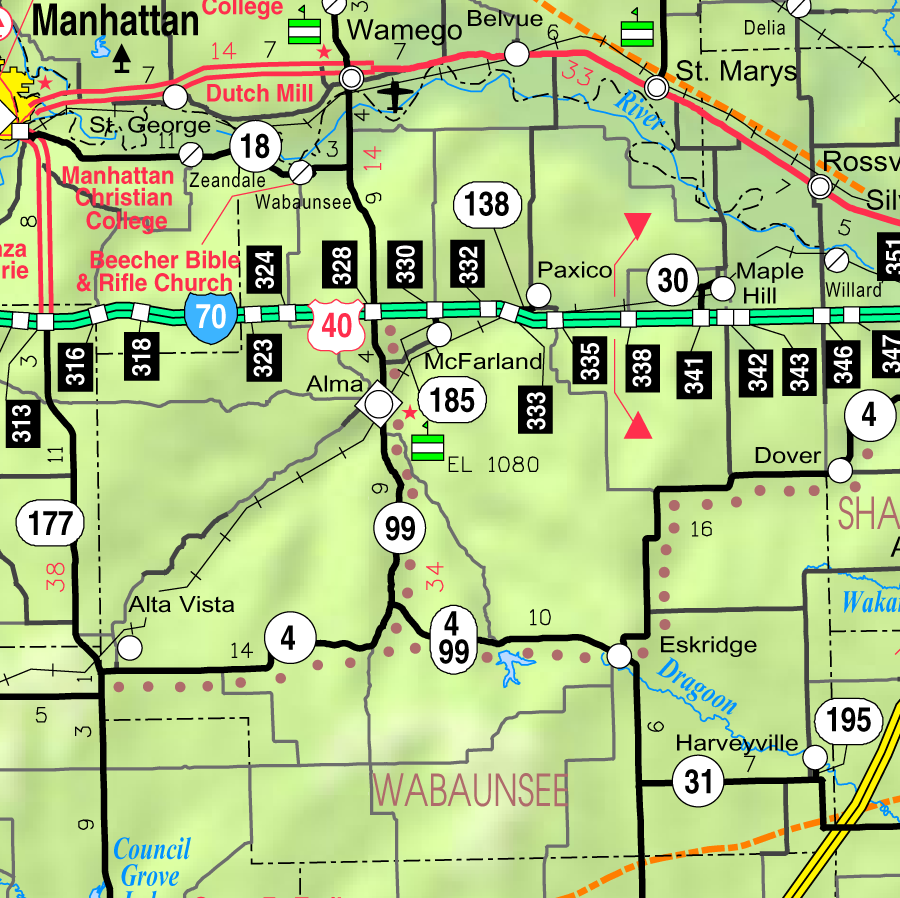
- KDOT map of Wabaunsee County (legend)

- Location within Kansas Location within the United States
- Coordinates: 39°08′46″N 96°20′46″W
- Country: United States
- State: Kansas
- County: Wabaunsee
- Township: Wabaunsee
- Founded: 1855
- Named for: Chief Waubonsie
- Elevation: 1,030 ft (310 m)

Population (2020)
  - Total: 104
- Time zone: UTC-6 (CST)
  - Summer (DST): UTC-5 (CDT)
- Area code: 785
- FIPS code: 20-74225
- GNIS ID: 476423

Wabaunsee is a census-designated place (CDP) in Wabaunsee County, Kansas, United States. As of the 2020 census, the population was 104. It was named for former Pottawatomi chief Wabaunsee.

== History ==
Wabaunsee was founded in 1855 by a group of nearly 100 emigrants from New Haven, Connecticut. They were inspired by a sermon given by well-known abolitionist Henry Ward Beecher, who donated money to help supply rifles for the men to defend themselves. The rifles were smuggled through pro-slavery areas in crates marked "Beecher's Bibles."

Wabaunsee was staunchly anti-slavery and became part of the Underground Railroad in late 1856 and helped Lawrence after Quantrill's Raid. In 1862, the Beecher Bible and Rifle Church was completed and after the Civil War, Wabaunsee hoped for a railroad, but it was constructed north of the river.

Wabaunsee served as the county seat until after the Civil War, when the seat was transferred to Alma.

Today, the community consists of several houses and buildings including the church which is on the National Register of Historic Places.

== Geography ==
Wabaunsee is located approximately one-half mile south of the Kansas River, in Wabaunsee Township along K-18, two miles west of K-99.

== Demographics ==
Historical population
Census	Pop.	Note	%±
2020	104		—
U.S. Decennial Census

Wabaunsee is part of the Topeka, Kansas Metropolitan Statistical Area.

== Education ==
The community is served by Wamego USD 320 public school district.

== Transportation ==
I-70 is approximately nine miles south of Wabaunsee and US-24 is three miles north, in Wamego. Most of the community is situated on the south side of K-18. Streets are maintained by the county.
