= .40-50 Sharps =

Rifle cartridge

The .40-50 Sharps, may reference two mutually incompatible black powder rifle cartridges, which were the smallest members in the Sharps family:

- .40-50 Sharps Straight or 40-1 7/8-inch Sharps, introduced in 1879
- .40-50 Sharps Necked (or Bottlenecked) or 40-1 11/16-inch Sharps, introduced in 1869
