= Beecher Bible and Rifle Church =

Historic church in Kansas, United States

- U.S. National Register of Historic Places
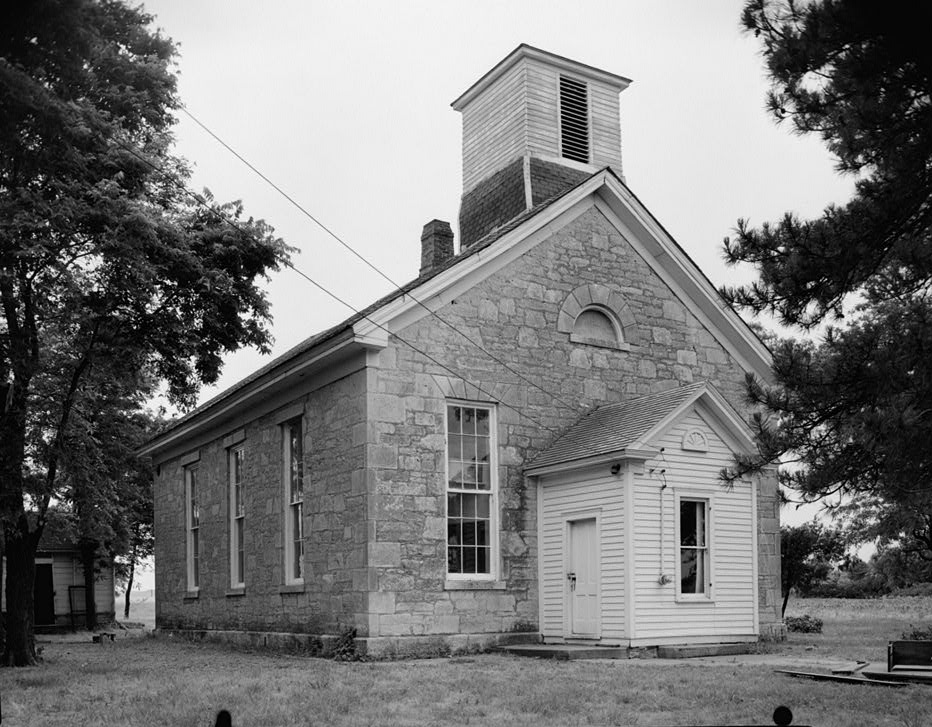
- Beecher Bible and Rifle Church in 1958

- Location within Kansas Location within the United States
- Location: SE corner of Chapel and Elm Sts., Wabaunsee, Kansas
- Coordinates: 39°8′40″N 96°20′44″W
- Area: 1 acre (0.40 ha)
- Built: 1862
- Architectural style: Plains Vernacular
- NRHP reference No.: 71000334
- Added to NRHP: February 24, 1971

Beecher Bible and Rifle Church is a historic church at the southeastern corner of Chapel and Elm Streets in Wabaunsee, Kansas. The church is named after Rev. Henry Ward Beecher, a financial backer for the town who helped smuggle rifles past pro-slavery forces in crates marked Bibles.

== History ==
The town of Wabaunsee was founded in 1855 by a group of about 70 New England emigrants from New Haven, Connecticut who established the Connecticut Kansas Colony, alternatively called the New Haven Colony or the Beecher Rifle Colony. The settlers were inspired by a sermon given by well-known abolitionist Henry Ward Beecher and Beecher gave money to help supply rifles for the men to defend themselves. The rifles were smuggled through pro-slavery areas in crates marked "Beecher's Bibles," and consequently the rifles themselves became known as Beecher's Bibles. Wabaunsee was staunchly anti-slavery and became part of the Underground Railroad in late 1856 and helped Lawrence after Quantrill's Raid.

In 1862 the Beecher Bible and Rifle Church was completed after four years of construction. The church was built of local limestone by church member Robert Banks, with contrasting stone accents. The overall style is described as Plains Vernacular. The structure is crowned by a gable roof and a wood bell tower. A central brick chimney vents wood stoves on the perimeter of the church, connecting to the chimney via metal stovepipes. The church is entered through a vestibule that provides access to the choir loft stairs. The main space was divided down the center into men's and women's sides.

The church building was added to the National Register of Historic Places in 1971.
