= Valentine Formation =

Geological formation in midwestern US

- Stratigraphic range: Miocene
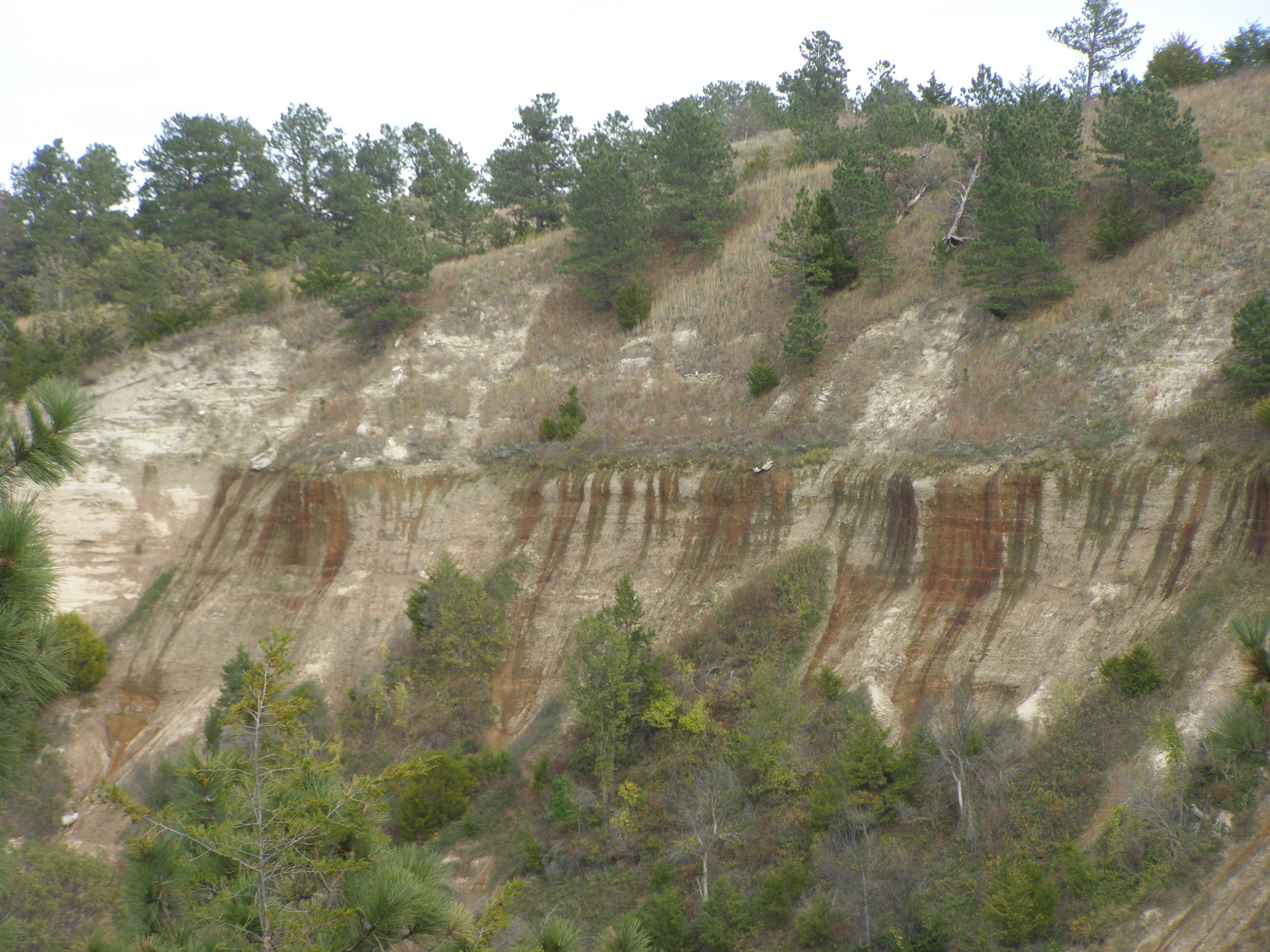
- Looser sand of the Valentine Formation sloping back from its contact with the Rosebud Formation on the Niobrara River at the Valentine, Nebraska, type location. Water from the Ogallala Aquifer seeps from the base of the Valentine down the face of the Rosebud.
- Type: Formation / Member
- Unit of: Ogallala Formation
- Overlies: Eroded and weathered Miocene units, Pierre Shale (Nebraska), and Niobrara Chalks

Location
- Region: South Dakota, Nebraska, Kansas
- Country: United States

Type section
- Named for: Valentine Railway Quarries, Valentine, Nebraska

The Valentine Formation is a geologic unit formation or member within the Ogallala unit in northcentral Nebraska near the South Dakota border. It preserves fossils dating to the Miocene epoch of the Neogene period and is particularly noted for Canid fossils. This unit consists of loosely consolidated sandstone that crumbles easily. These sands carry the water of the Ogallala Aquifer and is the source of much of the water in the Niobrara River. A particular feature of the Valentine is lenticular beds of green-gray opaline sandstone that can be identified in other states, including South Dakota, Nebraska, Kansas, and Colorado. Although three mammalian fauna stages can be mapped throughout the range of the Ogallala, no beddings of the Ogallala are mappable and all attempts of formally applying the Valentine name to any mappable lithology beyond the type location have been abandoned. Even so, opaline sandstone has been used to refer to this green-gray opalized conglomerate sandstone that is widely found in the lower Ogallala Formation.

== Development, the earliest Ogallala deposits ==
At the beginning of the Ogallala times, as sediments began washing out from the rising Rocky Mountains into the central plains states, the members of the Pierre Shale and Niobrara Formation outcrop had been largely exposed in their present outcrop range. The Niobrara had been broadly incised by the present river systems, but only to a fraction of their present depths. Therefore, the earliest Ogallala deposits, the time of the Valentine deposits, filled in these shallower valleys; but there was no continuous exposure over the range of the eastern outcrop of the Ogallala. Isolated exposures of the Valentine phase have been located along the Niobrara outcrop and quarried along the Smoky Hill River, Solomon River, Republican River, and Niobrara River where these watersheds have cut deeply down through the Niobrara Chalk into the Carlile Shale.

== Lithology ==
The Valentine Formation presents white, buff, gray to gray-green, unconsolidated, fine-to-coarse grained, fluvial siltstone, channel sandstone, and gravel eroded from uplift of the Rocky Mountains as well as locally eroded materials, particularly Niobrara chalk cobbles and chalk sand. Thin, localized beds of caliche are abundant. A specific index stone for the Valentine is the lenticular beds of grey-green opaline sandstone. Locally thick beds of volcanic ash are associated with the underlying opaline sandstone

== Distribution ==
Even as discussed above, the term Valentine is not now formally used outside of Northcentral Nebraska, older literature in other states with Ogallala may refer to the name.

The opaline sandstone of the lower Ogallala is recognized in Kansas in outcrops on hills to the east of the limits of the upper Ogallala (e.g., Rush, Graham, and Rooks counties). These outcrops, which formed in the bottoms of shallow valleys, are now found on the upper slopes of deeper valleys; that is, in inverted topographies.

The Ogallala's opaline sandstone is to be found in Arkansas River gravel at Pueblo, Colorado.

== Uses ==
The silicate cementation makes the opaline sandstone denser and harder than any other local stone, and it has been quarried as ballast, road gravel, and dam outflow rip-rap (e.g., Cedar Bluff Reservoir, Sherman Dam). The opaline sandstone has had limited use in construction, and example being the structures in the city park of Hill City, Kansas. Beds of flint or chert can be found higher in the Valentine and the weathered Niobrara Chalk is also silicified where there is contact with these beds in the Valentine.

== Fossil content ==
Color key: Taxon / Reclassified taxon / Taxon falsely reported as present / Dubious taxon or junior synonym / Ichnotaxon / Ootaxon / Morphotaxon	Notes; Uncertain or tentative taxa are in small text; ~~crossed out~~ taxa are discredited.

=== Mammals ===
==== Bats ====
Bats reported from the Valentine Formation
Genus	Species	Location	Stratigraphic position	Material	Notes	Images
Cf. Myotis	Cf. M. sp.	Annies Geese Cross Quarry, Knox County, Nebraska.	Crookston Bridge Member.	Right dentary lacking posterior end & teeth (UNSM 52004).	A mouse-eared bat approximately the size of Myotis septentrionalis.	
Potamonycteris	P. biperforatus	Annies Geese Cross Quarry, Knox County, Nebraska.	Crookston Bridge Member.	Left half of a rostrum (UNSM 52008).	A vespertilionid.	

==== Carnivorans ====
Carnivorans reported from the Valentine Formation
Genus	Species	Location	Stratigraphic position	Material	Notes	Images
Aelurodon	A. ferox	Boyd, Cherry, Brown, Knox, Keyapaha & possibly Sheridan counties, Nebraska.	Crookston Bridge, Cornell Dam, Devil's Gulch, Burge members.	Numerous specimens.	A borophagine dog.	
Aelurodon	A. mcgrewi	Brown, Cherry & Keya Paha counties, Nebraska.	Devil's Gulch & Crookston Bridge members.	Numerous skull elements.	A borophagine dog.	
Aelurodon	A. stirtoni	Cherry County, Nebraska.	Crookston Bridge & Burge members.	Numerous remains.	A borophagine dog, originally reported as Strobodon. Also found in the Tesuque Formation.	
?Amphicyonidae	Gen. et. sp. indet.	Railway Quarry "A", Cherry County, Nebraska.	Crookston Bridge Member.	Right femur lacking head (UNSM 76638).	Large carnivore, possibly a bear-dog.	
Bassariscus	B. parvus	Railway Quarry "A", Cherry County, Nebraska.	Crookston Bridge Member.	Left ramus (UNSM 25466).	A procyonid.	
Carpocyon	C. compressus	Cherry, Brown, Boyd & Keyapaha counties, Nebraska.	Cornell Dam, Crookston Bridge & Devil's Gulch members.	Numerous specimens.	A borophagine dog also known from the Ogallala, Pawnee Creek & Esmeralda formations.	
Carpocyon	C. cuspidatus	Railway Quarry "A", Cherry County, Nebraska.	Crookston Bridge Member.	Skull elements.	A borophagine dog.	
Carpocyon	C. webbi	Brown & Cherry counties, Nebraska.	Burge Member.	Many skull & jaw elements.	A borophagine dog also found in the Ash Hollow, Tesuque & Chamita formations.	
Cynarctus	C. saxatilis	Cherry, Brown, Knox & Webster counties, Nebraska.	Crookston Bridge, Cornell Dam & Devil's Gulch members.	Numerous specimens.	A borophagine dog.	
Felidae	Gen. et. sp. indet.	Railway Quarry "A", Cherry County, Nebraska.	Crookston Bridge Member.	Partial left maxilla (UNSM 76641).	A large cat.	
Hyperailurictis	H. intrepidus	Brown & Cherry counties, Nebraska.		Ramus remains.	A felid originally reported as Pseudaelurus.	
Hyperailurictis	H. marshi	Cherry County, Nebraska.		Articulated left & right rami (YPM 12865).	A felid originally reported as Pseudaelurus.	
Ischyrocyon	I. gidleyi	Cherry, Brown, Knox & Sheridan counties, Nebraska.	Devil's Gulch & Burge members.		A bear-dog.	
Leptarctus	L. cf. bozemanensis	Railway Quary "A", Cherry County, Nebraska.	Crookston Bridge Member.	Partial left ramus (UNSM 25467).	A mustelid.	
Leptocyon	L. vafer	Brown, Cherry, Keya Paha, Knox & Sheridan counties, Nebraska.	Cornell Dam, Crookston Bridge, Devil's Gulch, & Burge members.	Abundant specimens.	A canine dog.	
Mustelidae	Gen. et. sp. indet.	Railway Quarry "A", Cherry County, Nebraska.	Crookston Bridge Member.	Left ramus (UNSM 76640).	A small carnivore.	
Paratomarctus	P. euthos	Cherry, Brown & Sheridan counties, Nebraska.	Burge Member.	Abundant remains.	A borophagine dog also known from the Ash Hollow Formation.	
Paratomarctus	P. temerarius	Brown, Cherry & Webster counties, Nebraska.	Cornell Dam, Crookston Bridge & Devil's Gulch members.	Abundant remains.	A borophagine dog.	
Pseudaelurus	P. intrepidus	Brown & Cherry counties, Nebraska.		Ramus remains.	Moved to the genus Hyperailurictis.	
Pseudaelurus	P. marshi	Cherry County, Nebraska.		Articulated left & right rami (YPM 12865).	Moved to the genus Hyperailurictis.	
Pseudocyon	P. sp.	Brown (Norden Bridge, Lucht & June quarries) & Cherry counties, Nebraska.	Burge Member.		A bear-dog.	
Strobodon	S. stirtoni	Railway Quarries, Cherry County, Nebraska.	Crookston Bridge Member.	Right ramus (UNSM 76620) & right maxilla (UCMP 63657).	Junior synonym of Aelurodon.	
Tomarctus	T. near T. euthos	Railway Quarries, Cherry County, Nebraska.	Crookston Bridge Member.	Skull & limb elements.	A borophagine dog.	

==== Lagomorphs ====
Lagomorphs reported from the Valentine Formation
Genus	Species	Location	Stratigraphic position	Material	Notes	Images
Alilepus	A. sp.	Stewart Quarry.	Crookston Bridge Member.	Teeth.	A leporid.	
Hypolagus	H. fontinalis	Railway Quarries.	Crookston Bridge Member.	Dentaries & a maxilla.	A leporid.	
Hypolagus	H. parviplicatus	Railway Quarries.	Crookston Bridge Member.	Dentaries.	A leporid.	
Leporinae	Indeterminate	Stewart Quarry.	Crookston Bridge Member.	4 isolated premolars.	A leporid.	
Pronotolagus	P. albus	Stewart Quarry.	Crookston Bridge Member.	Teeth & jaw elements.	A leporid.	

==== Proboscideans ====
Proboscideans reported from the Valentine Formation
Genus	Species	Location	Stratigraphic position	Material	Notes	Images
Gomphotherium	G. osborni	Boyd County, Nebraska.		Near-complete skeleton.	A gomphothere.	
Tetrabelodon	T. osborni	Boyd County, Nebraska.		Near-complete skeleton.	Junior synonym of Gomphotherium.	

==== Rodents ====
Rodents reported from the Valentine Formation
Genus	Species	Location	Stratigraphic position	Material	Notes	Images
Anchitheriomys	A. fluminis	Norden Bridge Quarry, Brown County, Nebraska.	Crookston Bridge Member.		A castorid.	
Ceratogaulus	C. rhinocerus	Crookston Bridge Quarry, Cherry County, Nebraska.	Crookston Bridge Member.	UNSM 122005, 122007, 122010 & 122009.	A mylagaulid.	
Ceratogaulus	C. sp., cf. C. rhinocerus	Northcentral Nebraska.	Burge Member.	Multiple specimens.	A mylagaulid.	
Cupidinimus	C. nebraskensis	Cherry County, Nebraska.	Crookston Bridge Member.	Several mandibles.	A heteromyid.	
Eucastor	E. tortus	Brown, Cherry & Knox counties, Nebraska.	Cornell Dam, Crookston Bridge & Devil's Gulch members.	Skull elements.	A castorid.	
Megasminthus	M. tiheni	Norden Bridge Quarry, Brown County, Nebraska.		Jaw elements & teeth.	A zapodine.	
Monosaulax	M. skinneri	Cherry County, Nebraska.	Cornell Dam, Crookston Bridge & Devil's Gulch members.	Teeth, mandibles & cranial material.	A castorid.	
Nothodipoides	N. stirtoni	Cherry & Brown counties, Nebraska.	Burge Member.	A skull (FAM 65276) & 2 mandibles (FAM 65277 & 65279).	A castorid.	
?Plesiosminthus	?P. sp.	Brown (Norden Bridge quarry) & Cherry counties, Nebraska.		Mandibles & teeth.	A sicistine.	
Prodipoides	P. burgensis	Brown, Cherry & Knox counties, Nebraska.	Burge, Crookston Bridge & Devil's Gulch members.	Mandibles & partial skull.	A castorid.	
Prodipoides	P. dividerus	Brown & Cherry counties, Nebraska.	Burge, Devil's Gulch & Crookston Bridge members.	Mandibles (UCMP 29691, FAM 64314, 64319, 64316, & 64318) & partial cranium (FAM 64324).	A castorid also known from the Ash Hollow & Esmeralda formations.	
Temperocastor	T. valentinensis	Cherry & Webster counties.	Crookston Bridge Member.	Skull elements, scapula & radius.	A castorid.	

==== Ungulates ====
Ungulates reported from the Valentine Formation
Genus	Species	Location	Stratigraphic position	Material	Notes	Images
Calippus	C. proplacidus	Brown County, Nebraska.	Devil's Gulch Member.	Skull elements.	An equid.	
Calippus	C. regulus	Penny Creek localities, Webster County, Nebraska.		Multiple specimens.	An equid.	
Colbertchoerus	C. niobrarensis	Deep Creek Quarry, Brown County, Nebraska.	Devil's Gulch Member.	Partial skull (UNSM 2604).	A peccary also known from the Calvert & Choptank formations.	
Cormohipparion	C. johnsoni	Burge Quarry, Nebraska.	Burge Member.	Skull elements.	An equid.	
Cormohipparion	C. merriami	June & Midway quarries, Nebraska.	Burge Member.	Skull elements.	An equid.	
Cormohipparion	C. quinni	Brown County, Nebraska.	Devil's Gulch, Cornell Dam & Crookston Bridge members.	Multiple specimens.	An equid.	
Hemiauchenia	H. sp.	June Quarry, Brown County, Nebraska.	Burge Member.	A metacarpal.	A camelid.	
Protohippus	P. perditus	Brown County, Nebraska.	Devil's Gulch & Crookston Bridge members.	Numerous specimens.	An equid.	
Pseudhipparion	P. retrusum	Cherry & Brown counties, Nebraska.	Burge & Devil's Gulch members.	Numerous specimens, including many skulls & mandibles.	An equid.	
Stirtonhyus	S. xiphidonticus	Cherry & Knox counties, Nebraska.	Crookston Bridge & Devil's Gulch members.	Numerous specimens.	A peccary.	
Tapiravus	T. cf. polkensis	Webster & Cherry counties, Nebraska.		Mandibles.	Moved to the genus Tapirus.	
Tapiridae	Genus & species undetermined	Cherry County, Nebraska.	Crookston Bridge Member.	Teeth.	A tapir.	
Tapirus	T. cf. polkensis	Webster & Cherry counties, Nebraska.		Mandibles.	A tapir.	
Ustatochoerus	U. medius	Brown & Cherry counties, Nebraska.		Numerous specimens.	A merycoidodontid.	
Ustatochoerus	U.? schrammi	Boyd & Brown counties, Nebraska.		Jaw elements.	A merycoidodontid.	

=== Birds ===
Birds reported from the Valentine Formation
Genus	Species	Location	Stratigraphic position	Material	Notes	Images
Dissourodes	D. milleri	Cherry County, Nebraska.	Crookston Bridge Member.	Distal end of left tibiotarsus (UNSM 5780).	Lumped into the genus Mycteria.	
Heterochen	H. pratensis	Devil's Gulch, Brown County, Nebraska.		Nearly complete left tarsometatarsus (UNSM 5781).	A goose-like anseriform.	
Mycteria	M. milleri	Cherry County, Nebraska.	Crookston Bridge Member.	Distal end of left tibiotarsus (UNSM 5780).	A stork, originally reported as Dissourodes.	
Palaeonerpes	P. shorti	Driftwood Creek, Hitchcock County, Nebraska.	Equivalent to the top of the formation.	Distal end of left tibiotarsus (AMNH 1641).	A woodpecker.	

=== Reptiles ===
==== Squamates ====
Squamates reported from the Valentine Formation
Genus	Species	Location	Stratigraphic position	Material	Notes	Images
Ameiseophis	A. cf. A. robinsoni	Norden Bridge Quarry, Brown County, Nebraska.		Trunk vertebra (MSUVP 891).	A colubrid snake.	
Amphisbaenidae?	Indeterminate	Norden Bridge Quarry, Brown County, Nebraska.		A centrum of a dorsal vertebra (UNSM 61029).	A worm lizard.	
Anguidae	Unidentified	Norden Bridge Quarry, Brown County, Nebraska.		3 large osteoscutes (UNSM 61028).	An anguid lizard.	
Boidae	Indeterminate	Brown (Norden Bridge quarry) & Cherry counties, Nebraska.		Vertebrae & a fragmentary dentary.	Seems to be near the Ogmophis-Calamagras-Charina group.	
Boinae	Gen. et. sp. indet.	Norden Bridge locality, Brown County, Nebraska.		Caudal vertebra.	Similar to Charina.	
cf. Cnemidophorus	cf. C. sp.	Cherry County, Nebraska.		A right dentary.	A whiptail lizard.	
Colubridae	Indeterminate	Brown (Norden Bridge quarry) & Cherry counties, Nebraska.		Vertebrae.	At least 4 forms, including at least 1 natricine.	
Colubrinae	Gen. et. sp. indet.	Norden Bridge locality, Brown County, Nebraska.		2 precaudal vertebrae.	May represent an extinct genus or one found in Central or South America today.	
Elaphe	E. nebraskensis	Norden Bridge locality, Brown County, Nebraska.		Precaudal & anterior vertebrae.	A rat snake similar to E. vulpina in height of neural spine & size.	
Eumeces	E. minimus	Egelhoff Quarry, Keya Paha County, Nebraska.	Crookston Bridge Member, lowermost part of the formation.	A frontal bone (MSU-VP 790).	A skink originally thought to be a species of Peltosaurus, may be a nomen dubium.	
Eumeces	cf. E. sp.	Norden Bridge Quarry, Brown County, Nebraska.		Left dentary (MSUVP 966), 2 broken dentaries & a fragment of a maxilla (UNSM 61026).	A skink.	
Geringophis	G. depressus	Norden Bridge Quarry, Brown County, Nebraska.		1 trunk vertebra (MSUVP 893).	A boid.	
Gerrhonotus	G. sp.	Brown (Norden Bridge quarry) & Cherry counties, Nebraska.		An almost complete right dentary (UC 65857) & 3 vertebrae (UNSM 61027).	An alligator lizard.	
Iguanidae	Unidentified, form A	Cherry County, Nebraska.		Fragment of a right dentary (UC 65856).	An iguanid lizard.	
Iguanidae	Unidentified, form B	Norden Bridge Quarry, Brown County, Nebraska.		Fragment of a right dentary (UNSM 61025).	An iguanid lizard.	
Lampropeltis	L. similis	Norden Bridge locality, Brown County, Nebraska.		Precaudal vertebrae.	A kingsnake.	
Natricinae	Gen. et. sp. indet.	Norden Bridge locality, Brown County, Nebraska.		2 vertebrae.	"A rather small natricine snake, but not one of the diminutive forms".	
Nebraskophis	N. skinneri	Norden Bridge Quarry, Brown County, Nebraska.		Trunk vertebra (UNSM 61037).	A colubrid snake.	
Neonatrix	N. elongata	Norden Bridge Quarry, Brown County, Nebraska.		Trunk vertebra (MSUVP 967).	A colubrid snake.	
Neonatrix	N. magna	Norden Bridge Quarry, Brown County, Nebraska.		Trunk vertebra (MSUVP 943).	A colubrid snake.	
Paleoheterodon	P. tiheni	Norden Bridge locality, Brown County, Nebraska.		Precaudal vertebrae.	A colubrine closely related to Heterodon.	
Peltosaurus	P. minimus	Egelhoff Quarry, Keya Paha County, Nebraska.	Crookston Bridge Member, lowermost part of the formation.	A frontal bone (MSU-VP 790).	Thought to be a glyptosaurine but reassigned to the skink genus Eumeces.	
Phrynosoma	P. sp.	Cherry County, Nebraska.		An almost complete jaw (UC 65855) & 2 less complete jaws.	A horned lizard.	
Salvadora	S. paleolineata	Norden Bridge Quarry, Brown County, Nebraska.		Trunk vertebrae (MSUVP 892 & 968).	A patchnose snake.	
Viperidae	Indeterminate	Norden Bridge Quarry, Brown County, Nebraska.		Trunk vertebra (MSUVP 889).	A viper.	

==== Testudines ====
Testudines reported from the Valentine Formation
Genus	Species	Location	Stratigraphic position	Material	Notes	Images
Chrysemys	C. sp.	Norden Bridge Quarry, Brown County, Nebraska.		A near complete hyoplastron.	An emydid turtle.	
Emydoidea	E. hutchisoni	West Valentine Quarry, Cherry County, Nebraska.		Remains of at least 4 (probably more) individuals.	An emydid turtle.	
Geochelone	G. orthopygia	Norden Bridge Quarry, Brown County, Nebraska.		Shell & limb elements.	A tortoise.	
Glyptemys	G. valentinensis	Railway Quarry A, Cherry County, Nebraska.	Crookston Bridge Member.	Multiple carapace & bone specimens.	An emydid turtle.	
Trionyx	T. quinni	Norden Bridge Quarry, Brown County, Nebraska.		Hyoplastrons & pleural bones.	A softshell turtle.	
Trionyx	T. sp.	Brown (Norden Bridge quarry) & Cherry counties, Nebraska.		Multiple specimens.	A softshell turtle.	

=== Amphibians ===
Amphibians reported from the Valentine Formation
Genus	Species	Location	Stratigraphic position	Material	Notes	Images
Ambystoma	A. minshalli	Brown (Norden Bridge Locality) & Cherry counties, Nebraska.		Multiple specimens.	A mole salamander.	
Andrias	A. matthewi	Norden Bridge Locality, Brown County, Nebraska.		A maxilla & a fragment of a maxilla.	A giant salamander.	
Bufo	B. hibbardi	Norden Bridge Quarry, Brown County, Nebraska.		Right ilium (MSUVP 1013).	A true toad.	
Bufo	B. cf. hibbardi	Brown (Norden Bridge quarry) & Cherry counties, Nebraska.		Multiple specimens.	A true toad.	
Bufo	B. kuhrei	Norden Bridge Quarry, Brown County, Nebraska.		Proximal portion of a right tibiofibula (MSUVP 890).	A true toad.	
Bufo	B. valentinensis	Brown (Norden Bridge quarry) & Cherry counties, Nebraska.		Multiple specimens.	A true toad.	
Cryptobranchus	C. mccalli	Norden Bridge Quarry, Brown County, Nebraska.		A complete right maxilla & the anterior portion of a left maxilla.	Synonymized with Andrias matthewi.	
Geophryne	G. nordensis	Brown (Norden Bridge Quarry), Keya Paha (Egelhoff Local Fauna) & Knox (Annie's Geese Cross Local Fauna) counties, Nebraska.		4 ilia.	A hylid frog.	
Pseudacris	P. nordensis	Brown (Norden Bridge Quarry), Keya Paha (Egelhoff Local Fauna) & Knox (Annie's Geese Cross Local Fauna) counties, Nebraska.		4 ilia.	Reassigned to the genus Geophryne.	
Rana	R. sp.	Brown (Norden Bridge quarry) & Cherry counties, Nebraska.		Multiple specimens.	A ranid frog.	
Scaphiopus	S. (Spea) cf. alexanderi	Brown (Norden Bridge locality) & Cherry counties, Nebraska.		UNSM 61016 & 61017.	An American spadefoot toad.	
Scaphiopus	S. (Scaphiopus) wardorum	Norden Bridge Quarry, Brown County, Nebraska.		Multiple specimens.	An American spadefoot toad.	

=== Fish ===
Fish reported from the Valentine Formation
Genus	Species	Location	Stratigraphic position	Material	Notes	Images
Amia	A. sp.	Cherry County, Nebraska.		A broken left dentary (UC 65851) & a dorsal vertebra.	A bowfin.	
Ictalurus	I. sp.	Cherry County, Nebraska.		A pectoral spine, dorsal spine, right dentary, & numerous fragments of spines and vertebrae.	A catfish.	
Lepisosteus	L. sp.	Norden Bridge Locality, Brown County, Nebraska.		A scale.	A gar.	
Lepomis	L. cf. microlophus	Norden Bridge Locality, Brown County, Nebraska.		A left dentary.	A sunfish.	

=== Plants ===
Plants reported from the Valentine Formation
Genus	Species	Location	Stratigraphic position	Material	Notes	Images
Berriochloa	B. communis				A grass also found in the Ash Hollow Formation.	

== Gallery ==
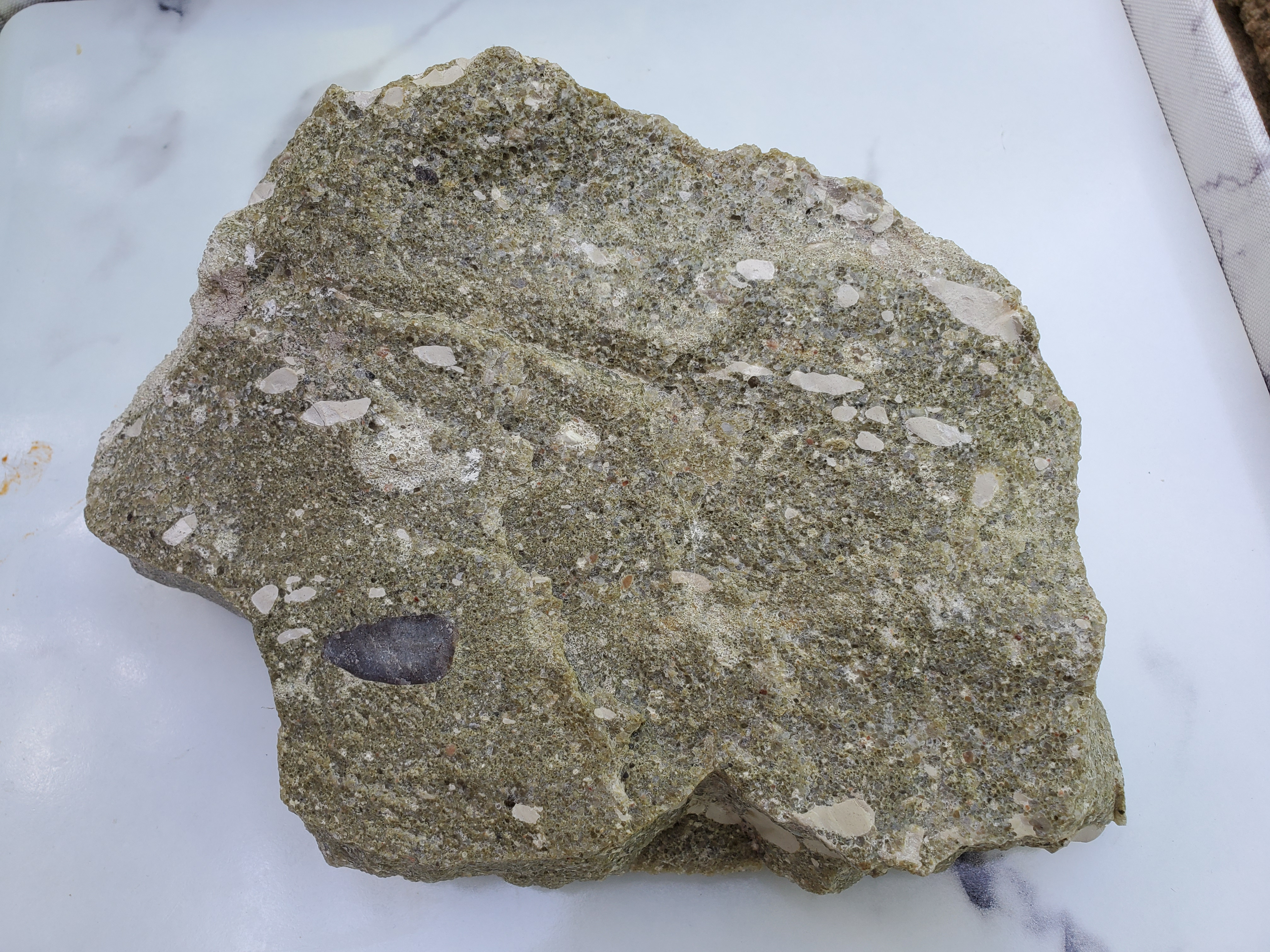
Valentine opaline sandstone with white Niobrara pebbles, Rush County, Kansas

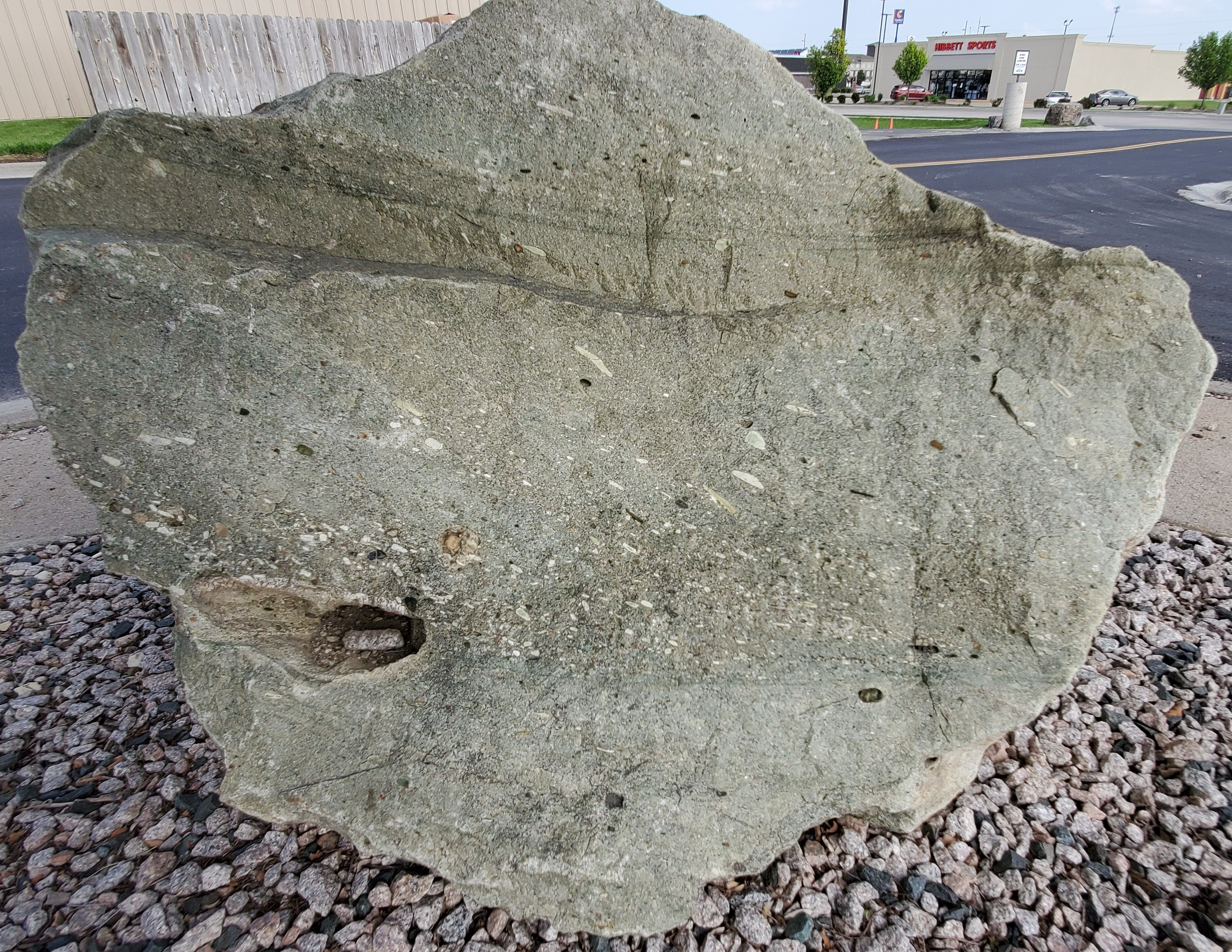
Valentine opaline sandstone, Hays, Kansas

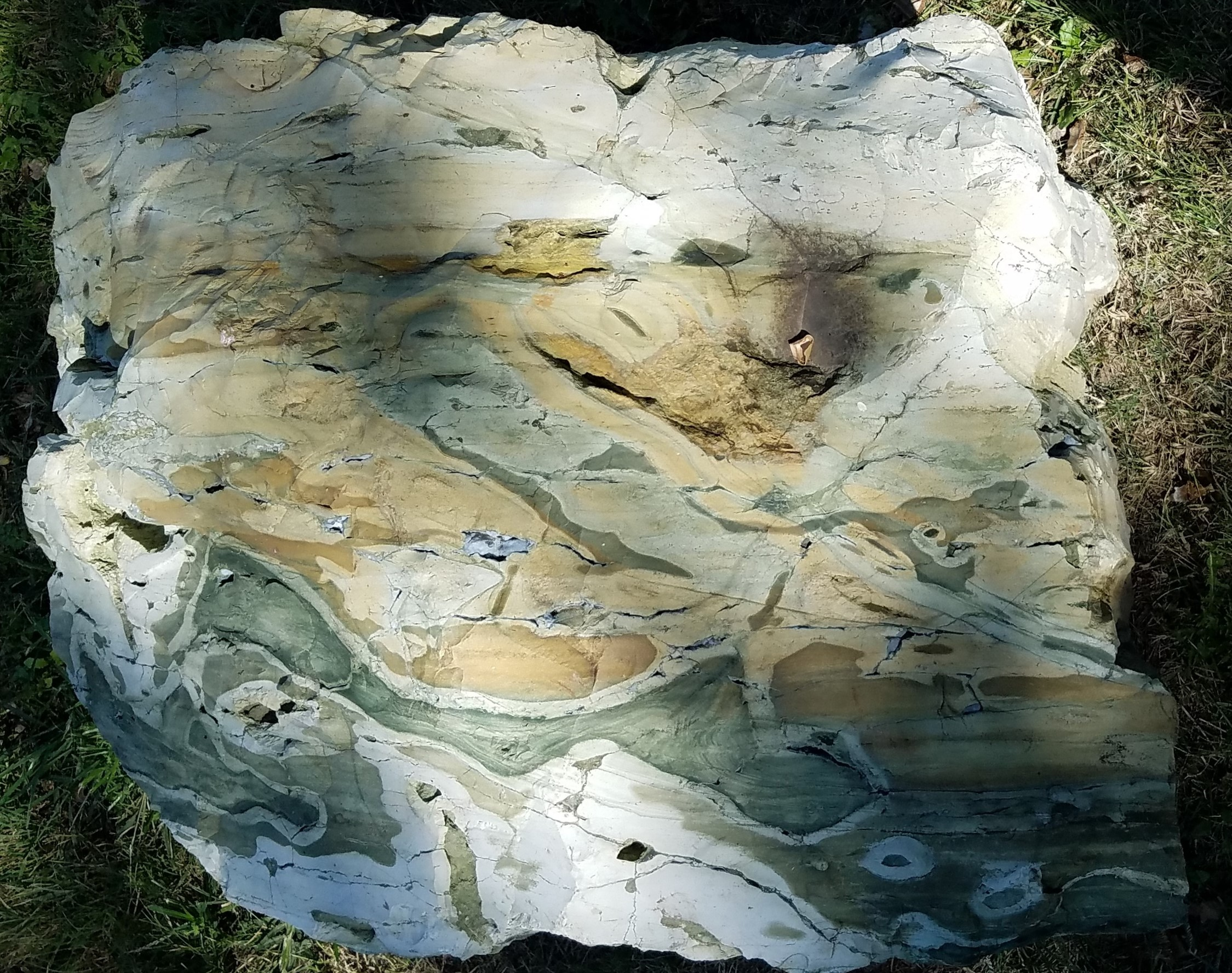
Valentine-contact opalized Niobrara, Frontier Park, Hays, Kansas

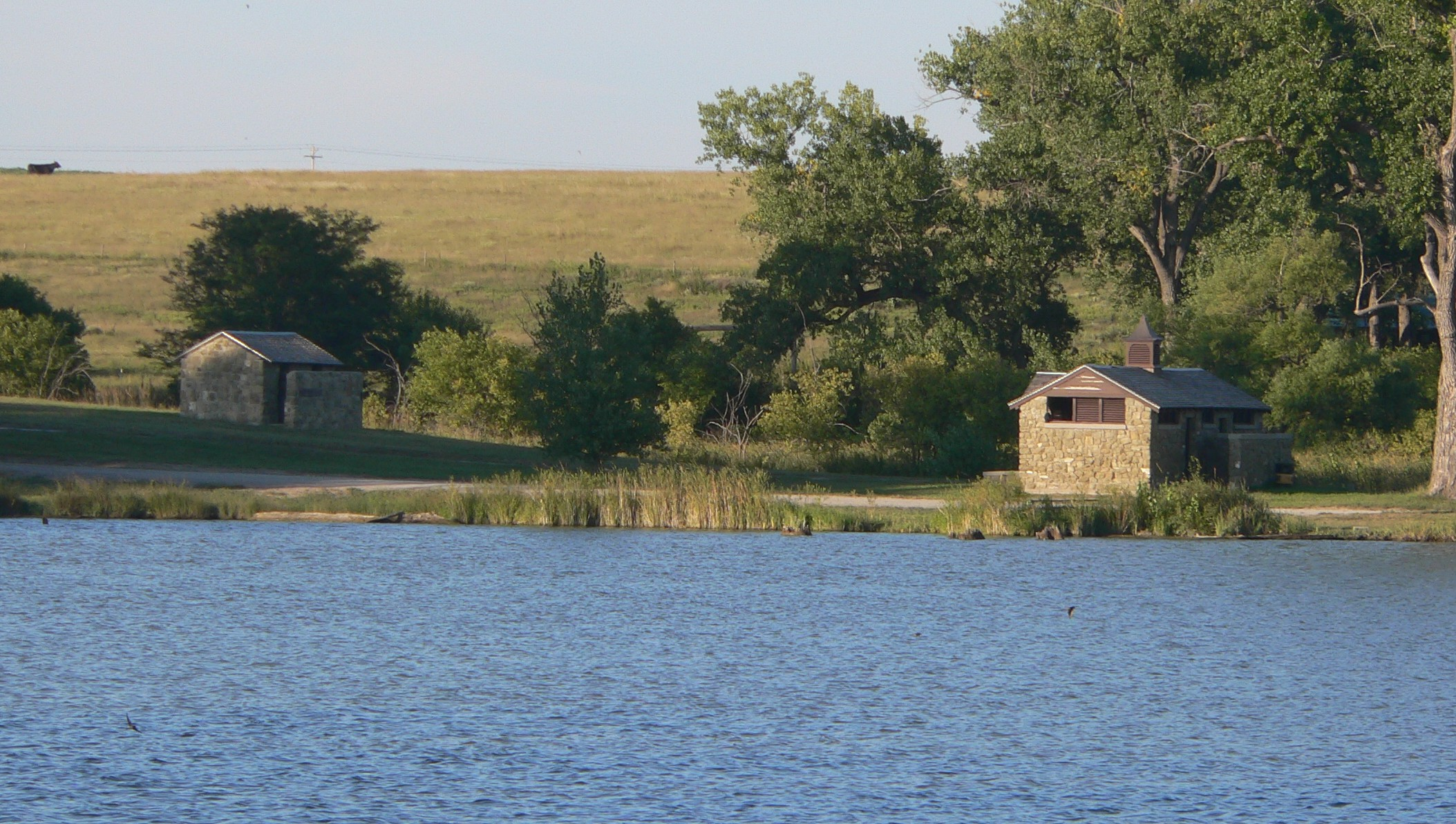
Antelope Lake Park buildings in Graham County, Kansas

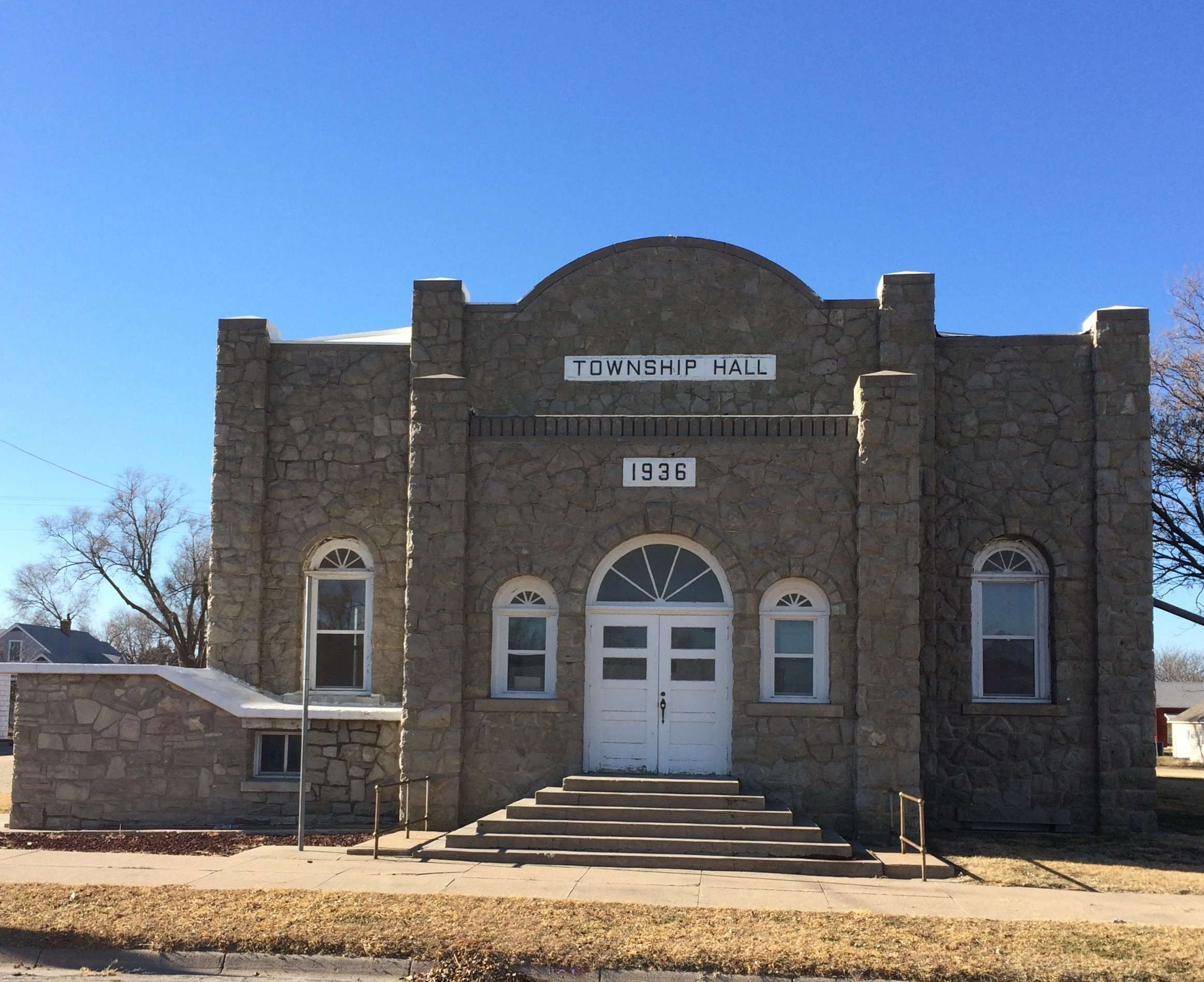
Bogue, Kansas Township Hall

== See also ==
- List of fossiliferous stratigraphic units in South Dakota
- Paleontology in South Dakota
- List of fossiliferous stratigraphic units in Nebraska
- Paleontology in Nebraska
- List of fossiliferous stratigraphic units in Kansas
- Paleontology in Kansas
