= Thin Elk Formation =

Thik Elk Formation(Natural fossil preservation)

- Stratigraphic range: Neogene
- Type: Formation

Location
- Region: South Dakota
- Country: United States

The Thin Elk Formation is a geologic formation in South Dakota. It preserves fossils dating back to the Neogene period.

== Fossil content ==
=== Mammals ===
==== Ungulates ====
Ungulates reported from the Thin Elk Formation
Genus	Species	Presence	Material	Notes	Images
Cormohipparion	C. occidentale	Ed Ross Ranch Quarry, Bennett County, South Dakota.	Skull (F:AM 71872).	An equid.	

== See also ==
- List of fossiliferous stratigraphic units in South Dakota
- Paleontology in South Dakota
