= Inyan Kara Group =

- Stratigraphic range: Cretaceous
- Type: Group
- Sub-units: Fall River Sandstone; Lakota Formation

Location
- Region: South Dakota
- Country: United States

The Inyan Kara Group is a geologic group classification applied in South Dakota and adopted in portions of Wyoming and Montana. It preserves fossils of the mid-Cretaceous period. Of late Albian age, this classification correlates with the lower Dakota Formation (Nishnabotna member) known in the southwest corner of the State.

The South Dakota Geological Survey has also extended the Graneros to group other formations into a unit that correlates with the upper Dakota Formation (Note: This definition is widely different than the generally consistent definitions of Graneros/Belle Fourche.). These state definitions of the Inyan Kara and Graneros Groups thereby cover the first two sequences of the Western Interior Seaway recorded by the Dakota Formation.

North Dakota also classifies the same strata as Inyan Kara, but only of formation rank without recognizing further formal subdivision, and assigns this Inyan Kara Formation as the lowest member of the Dakota Group. In North Dakota, the Inyan Kara is used for disposal of water produced from oil production.

== See also ==
- List of fossiliferous stratigraphic units in South Dakota
- Paleontology in South Dakota
