= Fort Randall Formation =

- Stratigraphic range: Neogene
- Type: Formation

Location
- Region: South Dakota
- Country: United States

The Fort Randall Formation is a geologic formation in South Dakota, United States. It preserves fossils dating back to the Neogene period.

== See also ==
- List of fossiliferous stratigraphic units in South Dakota
- Paleontology in South Dakota
