= Rosebud Beds =

Geologic formation in South Dakota

- Type: Formation

Location
- Region: South Dakota
- Country: United States

The Rosebud Beds is a geologic formation in South Dakota. It preserves fossils.

== See also ==
- List of fossiliferous stratigraphic units in South Dakota
- Paleontology in South Dakota
