= List of fossiliferous stratigraphic units in South Dakota =

This article contains a list of fossil-bearing stratigraphic units in the state of South Dakota, U.S.

== Sites ==
Group or Formation	Period	Notes
Arikaree Formation	Neogene	
Arikaree Group/Turtle Butte Formation	Paleogene	
Ash Hollow Formation	Neogene	
Batesland Formation	Neogene	
Bon Homme Gravel	Quaternary	
Brule Formation	Paleogene	
Carlile Shale	Cretaceous	
Chadron Formation	Paleogene	
Colorado Group/Greenhorn Limestone	Cretaceous	
Colorado Group/Niobrara Formation	Cretaceous	
Deadwood Formation	Cambrian	
Fort Randall Formation	Neogene	
Fort Union Formation	Paleogene	
Fox Hills Formation	Cretaceous	
Greenhorn Formation	Cretaceous	
Greenhorn Limestone	Cretaceous	
Harrison Formation	Miocene	
Hell Creek Formation	Cretaceous	
Inyan Kara Group/Lakota Formation	Cretaceous	
Judith River Formation	Cretaceous	
Lakota Formation	Cretaceous	
Lance Formation	Cretaceous	
Rosebud Beds	Neogene	
Lower Rosebud Beds	Neogene	
Minnelusa Formation	Carboniferous	
Monroe Creek Formation	Paleogene	
Montana Group/Fox Hills Formation	Cretaceous	
Montana Group/Hell Creek Formation	Cretaceous	
Montana Group/Pierre Shale	Cretaceous	
Morrison Formation	Jurassic	
Ogallala Formation	Neogene	
Paha Sapa Limestone	Paleogene	
Pierre Shale	Cretaceous	
Rosebud Formation	Neogene, Paleogene	
Sharps Formation	Paleogene	
Slim Buttes Formation	Paleogene	
Sundance Formation	Jurassic	
Thin Elk Formation	Neogene	
Turtle Butte Formation	Paleogene	
Valentine Formation	Neogene	
White River Formation	Paleogene	
Whitewood Limestone	Ordovician	

== See also ==
- Paleontology in South Dakota
