= Turtle Butte Formation =

Geologic formation in South Dakota, United States

- Stratigraphic range: Paleogene
- Type: Formation

Location
- Region: South Dakota
- Country: United States

The Turtle Butte Formation is a geologic formation at Turtle Butte in South Dakota. It preserves fossils dating back to the Paleogene period.

== See also ==
- List of fossiliferous stratigraphic units in South Dakota
- Paleontology in South Dakota
