= Rosebud Formation =

Geological formation in midwestern US

- Stratigraphic range: Miocene
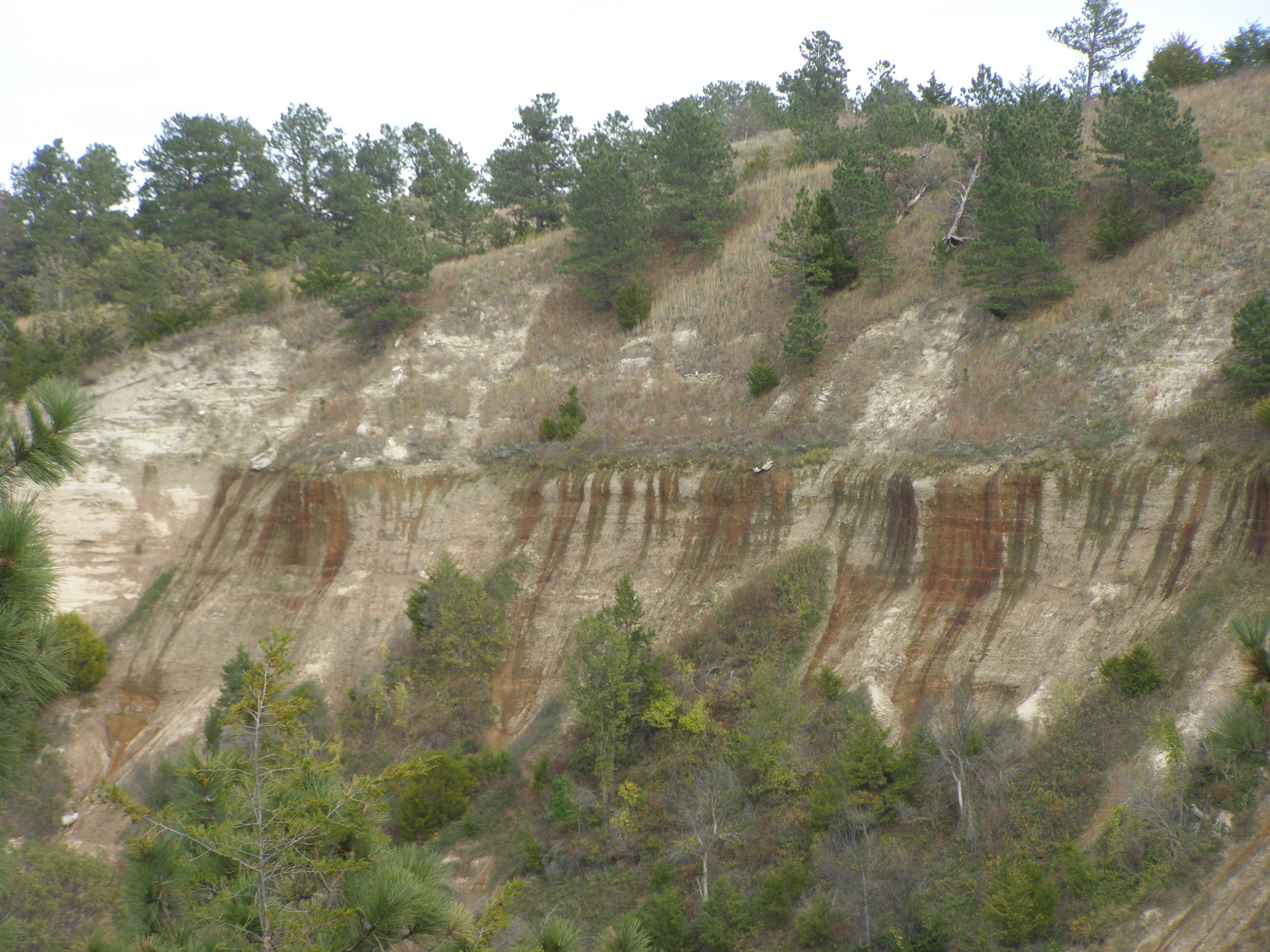
- Along the north banks of the Niobrara River in northern Nebraska, the pink of the Rosebud Formation is commonly seen with many seeps, trickles, and waterfalls emitting from the Ogallala Aquifer in the overlying Valentine Formation
- Type: Formation
- Unit of: Arikaree Group
- Underlies: Valentine Formation

Lithology
- Primary: pink siltstone

Location
- Region: Nebraska, South Dakota
- Country: United States

The Rosebud Formation is a geologic formation of cemented pink silt in Nebraska and South Dakota, dating to the early middle Miocene epoch of the Neogene period. Possibly named for its color, no type location has been set for this unit, but it is associated with the Valentine Formation along the Niobrara River. The fine silt of the formation forms an aquitard beneath the Ogallala Aquifer carried by the Valentine Formation. Many springs from the Valentine sands flow down the Rosebud outcrop into the Niobrara River.

== See also ==
- Paleontology in Nebraska
- Paleontology in South Dakota
- List of fossiliferous stratigraphic units in Nebraska
- List of fossiliferous stratigraphic units in South Dakota
