= Batesland Formation =

Geologic formation in South Dakota

- Stratigraphic range: Neogene
- Type: Formation

Location
- Region: South Dakota
- Country: United States

The Batesland Formation is a geologic formation in South Dakota. It preserves fossils dating back to the Neogene period.

== See also ==
- List of fossiliferous stratigraphic units in South Dakota
- Paleontology in South Dakota
