= Turtle Butte =

Summit in Tripp County, South Dakota, United States

Coordinates: 43°03′38″N 99°50′30″W

Turtle Butte is a summit in Tripp County, South Dakota, in the United States. With an elevation of 2,343 feet (714 m), Turtle Butte is the 456th highest summit in the state of South Dakota.

Turtle Butte derives its name from a Native American legend in which a warrior sat upon a rock only to realize the rock was in fact a giant turtle.

Turtle Butte Formation is a named geological formation on the western side of the summit.
