= Esmeralda Formation =

Geologic formation in Nevada, United States

- Stratigraphic range: Neogene
- Type: Formation

Location
- Region: Nevada
- Country: United States

The Esmeralda Formation is a geologic formation in Nevada. It preserves fossils dating back to the Neogene period. It is located in Stewart Valley, within Mineral County, Nevada. It is named after the town of Esmeralda 100 kilometers south, because of similar lithology between the two sites.

== Formation ==
In the early Miocene era, Stewart Valley was downdropped as a graben, and the Cedar Mountains and Gabba Valley rose up to the east and west of it. Throughout the majority of the Miocene, the main drainage which formed the Stewart Valley flowed south. As it fluctuated, it would sometimes cross with basins to the east. This movement deposited sediments of the Esmeralda Formation. As the Miocene came to and end, faulting began to occur on the east and southeast of the valley. Due to this fault pattern, drainage from the river was redirected north, and the Gabbs valley range was dropped to a height comparable to that of the Cedar Mountain.

== See also ==
- List of fossiliferous stratigraphic units in Nevada
- Paleontology in Nevada
