= Paleontology in South Dakota =

Paleontological research in the U.S. state of South Dakota

The location of the state of South Dakota

Paleontology in South Dakota refers to paleontological research occurring within or conducted by people from the U.S. state of South Dakota. South Dakota is an excellent source of fossils as finds have been widespread throughout the state. During the early Paleozoic era South Dakota was submerged by a shallow sea that would come to be home to creatures like brachiopods, cephalopods, corals, and ostracoderms. Local sea levels rose and fall during the Carboniferous and the sea left completely during the Permian. During the Triassic, the state became a coastal plain, but by the Jurassic it was under a sea where ammonites lived. Cretaceous South Dakota was also covered by a sea that was home to mosasaurs. The sea remained in place after the start of the Cenozoic before giving way to a terrestrial mammal fauna including the camel Poebrotherium, three-toed horses, rhinoceroses, saber-toothed cat, and titanotheres. During the Ice Age glaciers entered the state, which was home to mammoths and mastodons. Local Native Americans interpreted fossils as the remains of the water monster Unktehi and used bits of Baculites shells in magic rituals to summon buffalo herds. Local fossils came to the attention of formally trained scientists with the Lewis and Clark Expedition. The Cretaceous horned dinosaur Triceratops horridus is the South Dakota state fossil.

== Eras ==
=== Paleozoic ===
No Precambrian fossils are known from South Dakota, so the state's fossil record does not begin until the Paleozoic Era. At the start of the Paleozoic, South Dakota was submerged by a sea. The state's Cambrian life left behind a rich trace fossil record. Paleozoic marine life of South Dakota included brachiopods, cephalopods, and corals. The sea temporarily withdrew from South Dakota during the Ordovician period. But, in the middle or late Ordovician, ostracoderms swam over South Dakota. Similar ostracoderms were preserved near Canon City, Colorado.

Later, during the Carboniferous period, sea levels again began to rise and fall. Marine life from this time included brachiopods and corals, but the rock record preserves evidence for local brackish and freshwater environments as well. The sea withdrew from the state altogether during the Permian and local sediments began being eroded rather than deposited.

=== Mesozoic ===
During the Triassic period, sedimentation resumed. The geologic record reveals that South Dakota was a moist coastal plain at that time. Seawater once more covered South Dakota during the Jurassic period. This sea was home to creatures like ammonites, clams, crinoids, and starfish. As the sea retreated, South Dakota became a terrestrial environment dotted with lakes, streams, and swamps. The state was covered again by the sea during the Cretaceous period. This sea, the Western Interior Seaway, was home to many invertebrates, aquatic birds, and marine reptiles. The Cretaceous life of South Dakota was similar to that found in what is now Wisconsin.

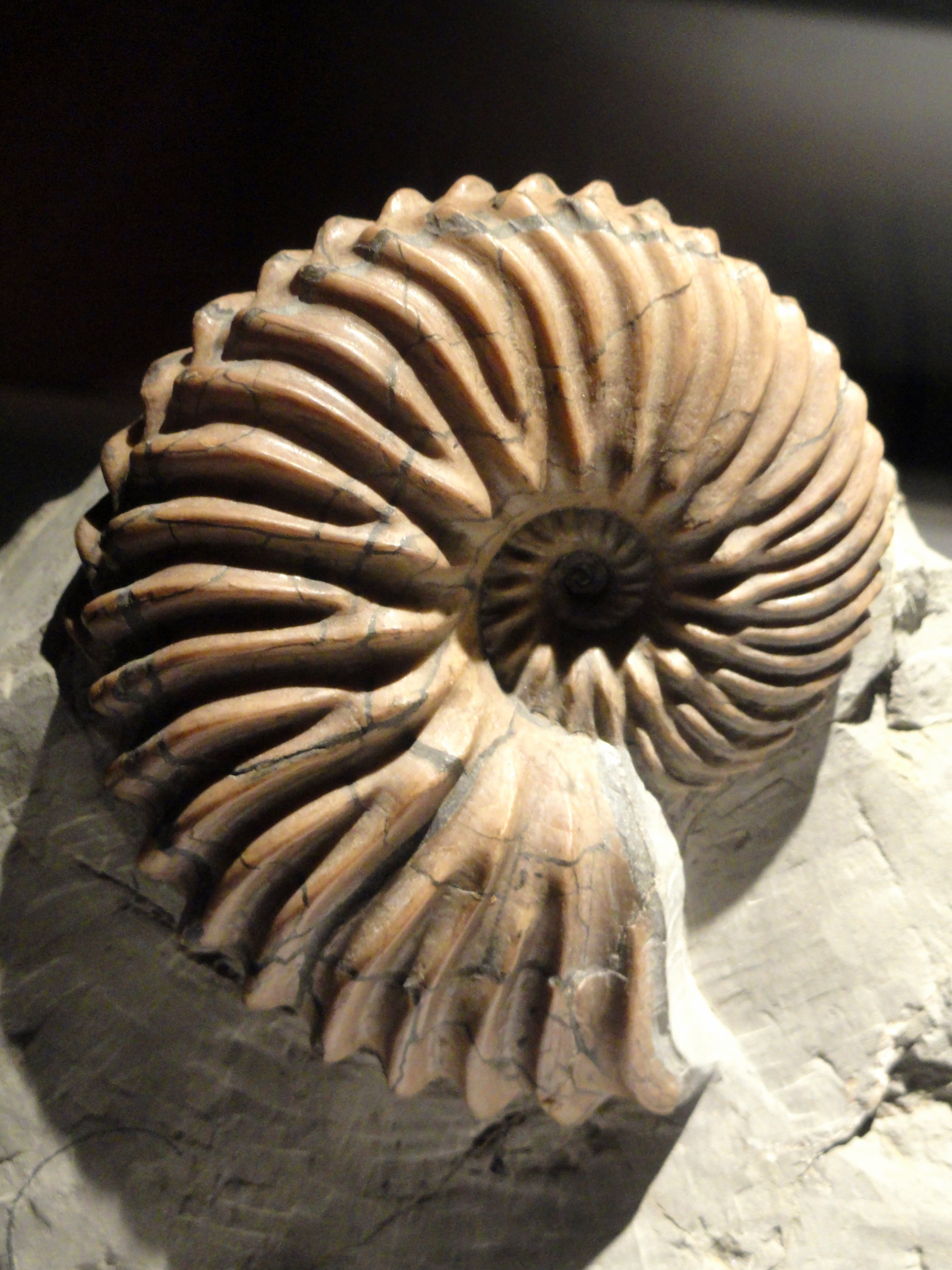
A Late Cretaceous ammonite found in the Fox Hills Formation

Some of South Dakota's ammonites were very unusual for the group.

During the Late Cretaceous, the region now occupied by the Black Hills of South Dakota may have attracted long-necked plesiosaurs from hundreds of miles away as a source of gastroliths. Short-necked plesiosaurs like Dolichorhynchops also lived in the Western Interior Seaway of South Dakota during the Campanian. They were fast swimmers who fed on contemporary small fish and cephalopods. Most short-necked plesiosaurs were relatively small, with body lengths of less than ten feet. However, one South Dakotan individual was 6–7 meters (20–23 ft) long.

More shark species are known from the Cretaceous Western Interior Seaway deposits of South Dakota than other states, with rocks from the same environment like those of Kansas. Otherwise, these two states had similar shark communities.

During the Late Campanian, South Dakota was home to the colossal sea turtle Archelon ischyros. The first specimen was 3.5 meters (11 feet) long. Archelon is the largest known turtle in history. Its size is comparable to that of a small car. Also during the Cretaceous, geologic uplift was forming the Black Hills in the western part of the state. Local dinosaurs included the armored Edmontonia, duck-billed Edmontosaurus, the ostrich dinosaur Ornithomimus, Pachycephalosaurus, Triceratops, and Tyrannosaurus.

=== Cenozoic ===
During the early part of the Cenozoic, central and eastern South Dakota was still covered by the sea. The uplift responsible for the Black Hills continued to elevate their topography. As the Cenozoic continued, the sea shrank away from the state. In its place, grasslands formed and were roamed by herds of grazing mammals.

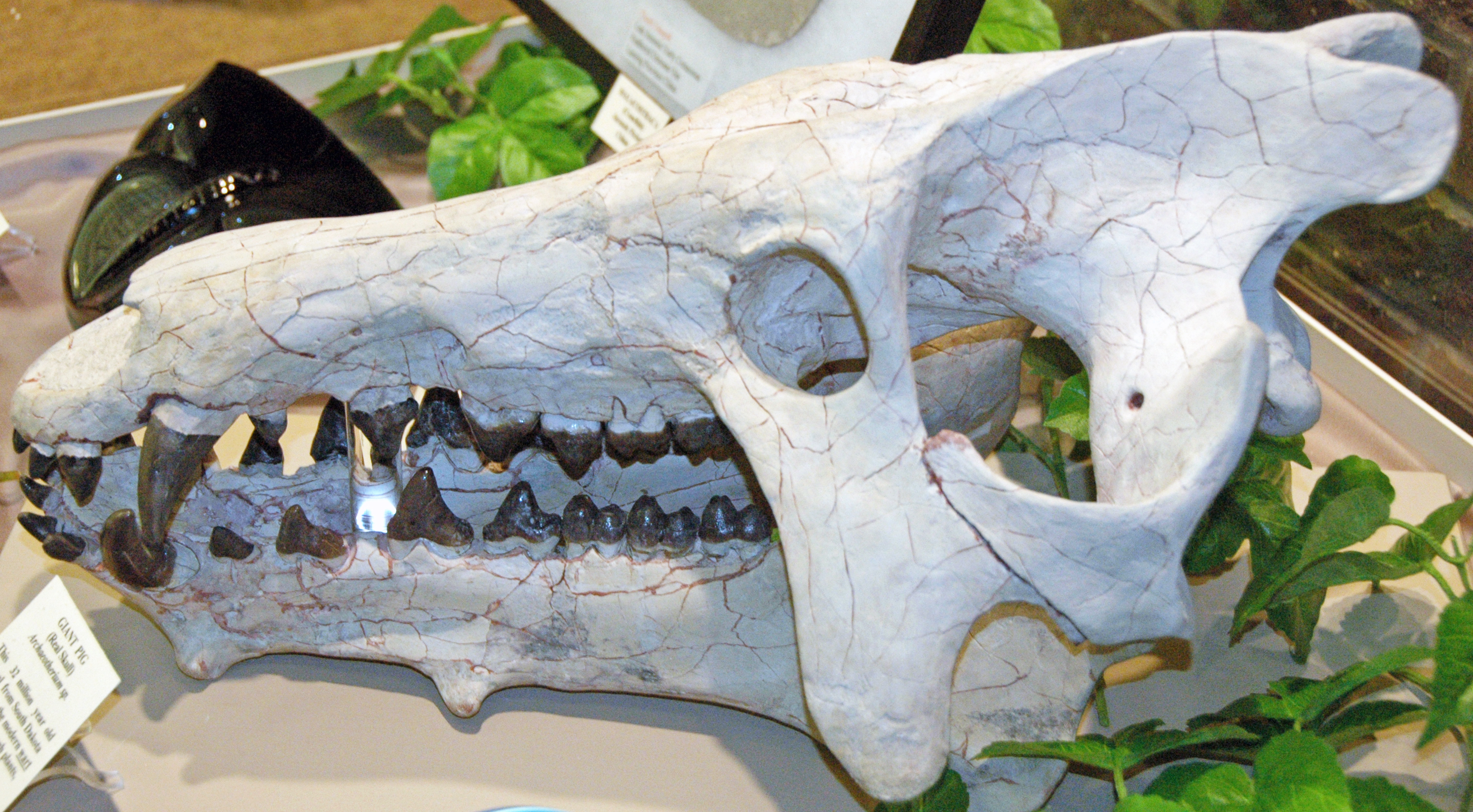
Archaeotherium skull from the White River Badlands on display at the Badlands Dinosaur Museum in North Dakota

Later, during the Oligocene, at least part of South Dakota was covered in seawater. The White River Formation was being deposited in the White River badlands as the sea gradually receded. The Oligocene flora left behind few fossils, but among them were hackberry seeds and petrified wood. Although plant fossils are scarce, these deposits preserve one of the best Tertiary mammal faunas in the world. More than 175 different kinds of animals were preserved from this time. The local mammals included three-toed horses, pig-like animals, the camel Poebrotherium, Protoceras, rhinoceroses, rodents, saber-toothed cats, tapirs, and titanotheres. Contemporary birds also left behind bones and even an egg. These are significant because bird fossils are very rare.

Many streams carried even more sediment into the region from the young Rocky Mountains and Black Hills. At the time, South Dakota consisted of plains dotted with marshes and shallow lakes and split by wide streams. Some of the local Oligocene wildlife left behind footprints that would later fossilize. The Brule Formation preserves one of only seven Oligocene fossil tracksites in the western United States. Volcanic activity sporadically showered the state with ash.

During the Ice Age, glaciers scoured the state. As they melted, they deposited sediments that would preserve the fossil remains of creatures like bison, horses, mammoths, and mastodons.

== Historiography ==
=== Indigenous interpretations ===
Fossils feature in some of the legends of local people. The Sioux believed that in the first creatures in creation were the insects and reptiles, who were ruled by the water monster Unhcegila. Reptiles were very diverse and came in all shapes and sizes, but they became violent and bloodthirsty until they were petrified by lightning sent by the thunderbirds. The physical bodies of the Thunder Beings killed by the lightning, including Unhcegila, also ended up being buried. The Sioux believe that earth has a history of four distinct ages. These events occurred during the Age of Rock. This portrayal of the thunderbirds may have been influenced by associations of fossils of the Cretaceous pterosaur Pteranodon with marine reptiles of the same age in the western United States.

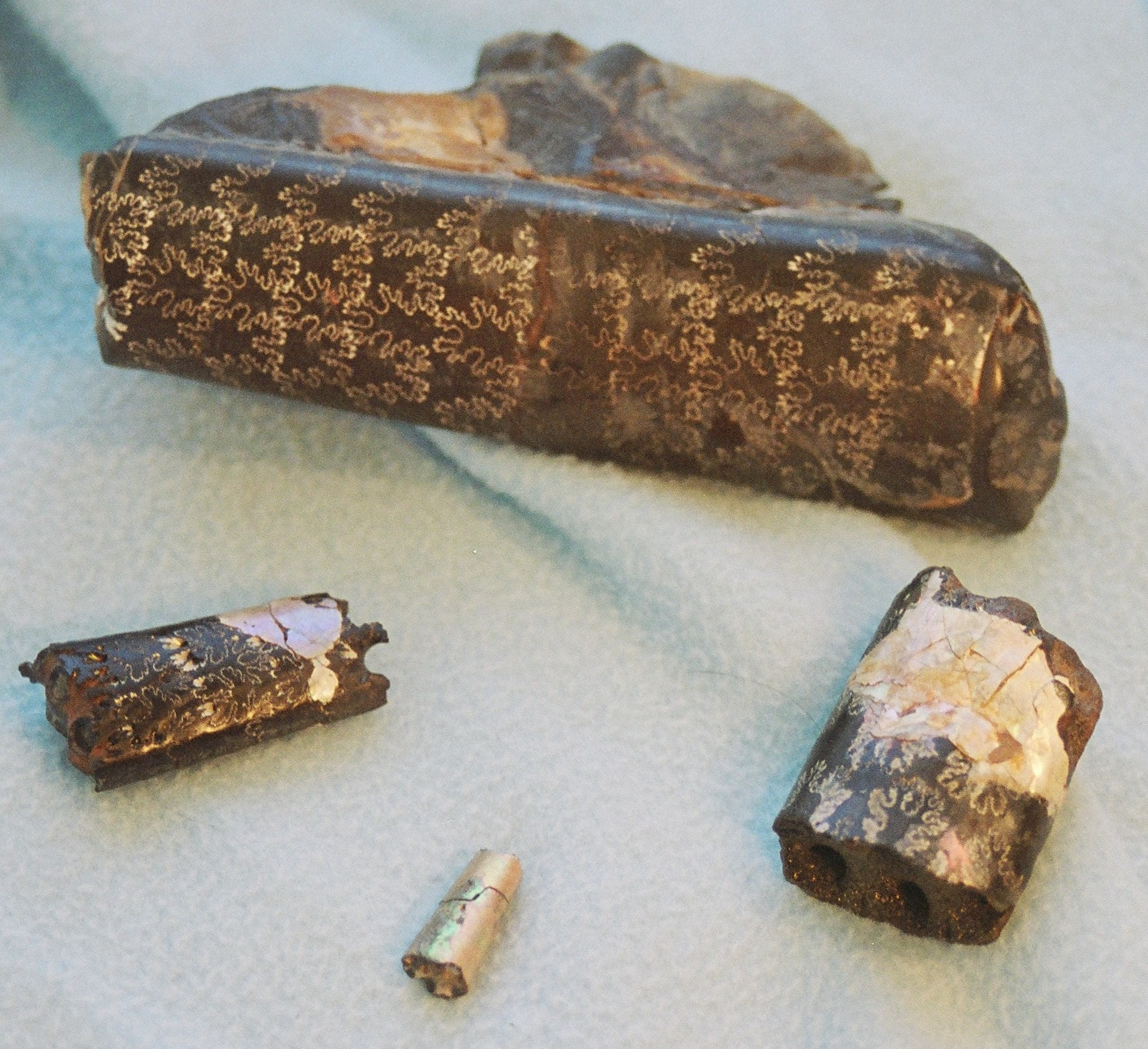
Baculites fossils.

Local people also employed fossils in ritual. Plains Indians like the Blackfeet and Cheyenne have a tradition of using Baculites fossils to summon bison herds. When used this way, the fossils are called "buffalo-calling stones" or Iniskim. This practice derives from the complex shapes of the fossil's internal structure, which can sometimes bear shapes resembling buffalo. Iniskim have been discovered in South Dakota archeological sites. Archaeological evidence exists for the buffalo-calling stone tradition that is at least 1,000 years old.

One interesting South Dakota fossil was found not far from the Gobernador ruins in New Mexico during the 1980s. It was the jawbone of an Oligocene mammal endemic to South Dakota. This means someone would have had to transport the bone for 800 miles from the place it was discovered. The Blackfeet engaged in regular trade with the Cliff Dweller and Navajo peoples of the southwest, which may explain how the fossil ended up so far from its place of origin.

=== Scientific research ===
On September 10, 1804, four members of the Lewis and Clark Expedition recorded in their journals a fossil discovery along the banks of the Missouri River in what is now Gregory County in south-central South Dakota. The find was a 45-foot-long (14 m) articulated vertebral column, ribs, and teeth at the top of a high ridge. The men interpreted the remains as originating from a giant fish, but today scientists think the specimen was probably a mosasaur or plesiosaur. The expedition sent back some of the fossils, but these were later lost.

In 1847, Hiram A. Prout published a description of a fragmentary titanothere jaw discovered in the White River Badlands in the American Journal of Science. Not long afterward, Joseph Leidy described the Oligocene camel Poebrotherium, which was discovered in the same general region as Prout's titanothere jaw. The government responded to these discoveries by dispatching an expedition into the area. In 1850 the Smithsonian sent its own collectors into the area. The Tertiary deposits of the White River Badlands was active for decades and still ongoing in 1920 when the South Dakota School of Mines published its "Bulletin No. 13". This publication summarized the results of all of the paleontological fieldwork done in the White River Badlands. In 1877, the United States Geological Survey published a report on the ancient plants and invertebrates of South Dakota.

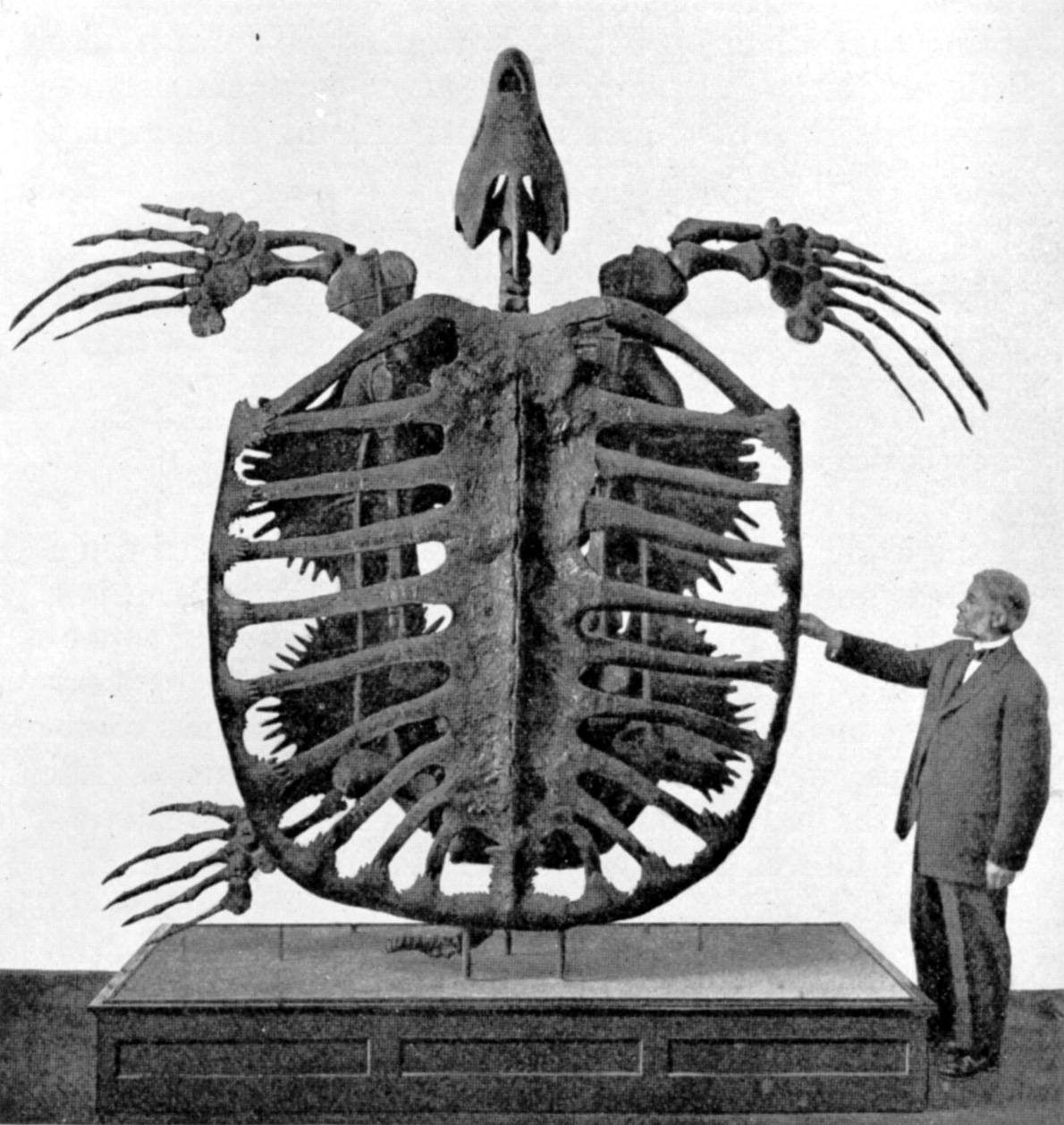
Type specimen (YPM 3000) of Archelon ischyros in the Yale Peabody Museum, Yale University

In 1895, George Wieland discovered YPM 3000, the nearly complete and articulated type specimen of the giant sea turtle now known as Archelon ischyros, which had been preserved in the Pierre Shale. The discovery was the likely instigator for Wieland's subsequent research into Late Cretaceous sea turtles that began the next year.

In 1940, the South Dakota School of Mines and Technology collaborated with National Geographic on an expedition into the badlands. They uncovered tons of fossils from at least 175 different species of Oligocene life. The fossils were taken to the South Dakota School of Mines in Rapid City. Among the mammal discoveries were the remains of rhinoceroses, tapirs, three-toed horses, pig-like animals, and rodents. The team also uncovered some bird fossils, which are very rare. One of these was a fossil egg, which author Marian Murray has called "[t]he best find" of the entire expedition. Only a few plant specimens were discovered, but these included fossil hackberry seeds and petrified wood. Some of the fossils were so precariously located that the excavators had to use block and tackle to lower the fossils down from the tops of "slender pinnacles". The fossils were preserved in channel sandstones that had received little scientific attention prior to the expedition.

In June 1947, South Dakota School of Mines sent another expedition into the Badlands. They uncovered a wide variety of fossils preserved in the Oligocene White River Formation. Among the creatures discovered were rhinoceroses, saber-toothed cats, giant pig-like animals, Protoceros, tapirs, horses and more.

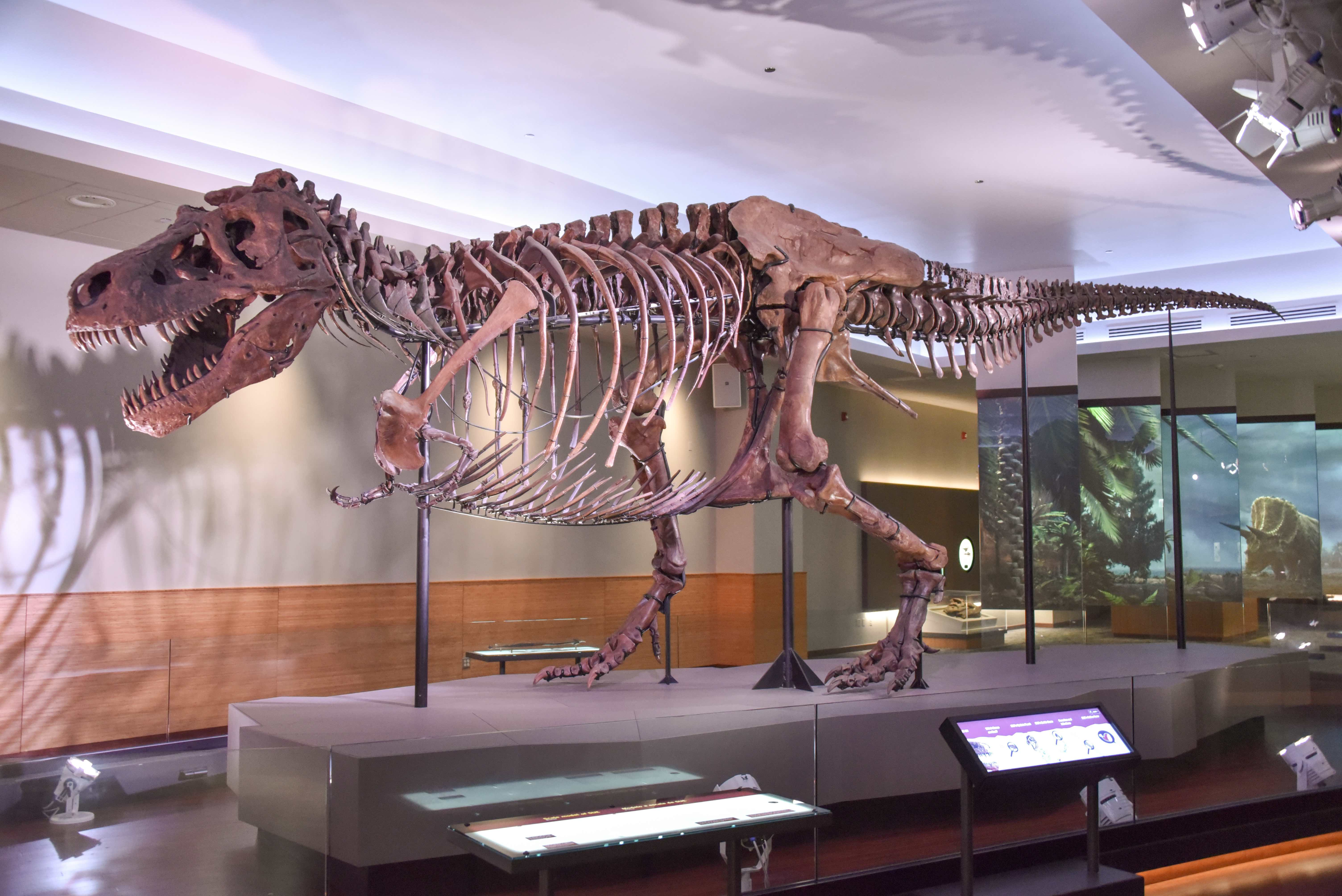
"Sue" on display at the Chicago Field Museum

In 1990, Sue Hendrickson discovered a new specimen of Tyrannosaurus rex that would later be nicknamed in her honor. The specimen made headlines when a dispute over ownership rights raged for more than five years. "Sue" was determined to rightfully belong to the owner of the property it was found on. The rancher put the specimen up for auction and was purchased by the Chicago Field Museum for $8.36 million.

In 1996, Bell and others reported the discovery of a mosasaur of the genus Plioplatecarpus in South Dakota's Pierre Shale. The specimen was important because it preserved several juvenile skeletons inside its pelvic region. Similar fossils have been put forward as evidence of live birth in other types of marine reptiles.

== Protected areas ==
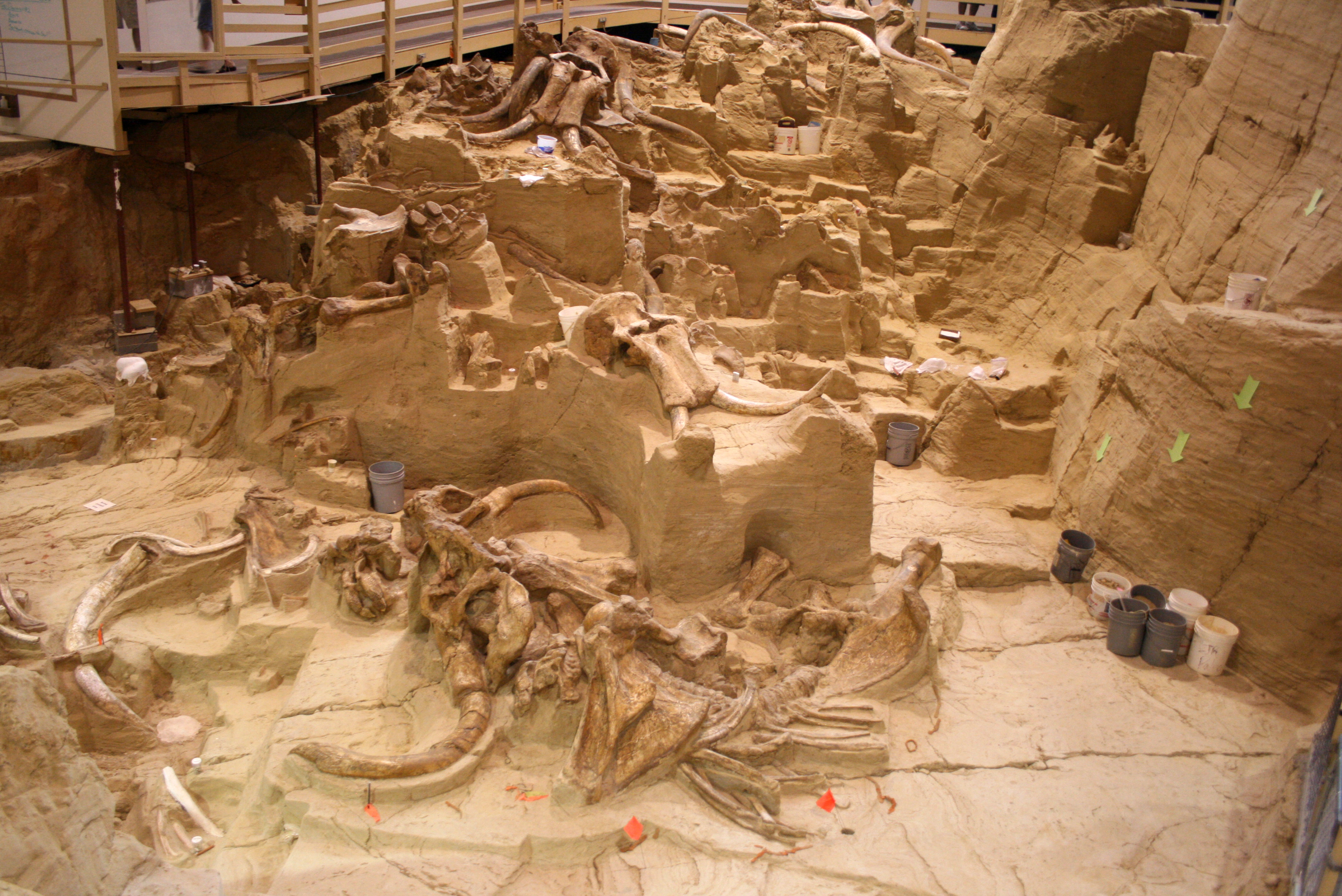
Mammoth bones at the Hot Springs Mammoth Site

- Badlands National Park
- Fossil Cycad National Monument (no longer exists)

== Paleontology museums ==
- Grand River Museum, Lemmon
- The Journey Museum, Rapid City
- Lemmon Petrified Wood Park & Museum, Lemmon
- The Mammoth Site Museum of Hot Springs, Hot Springs
- Museum of Geology, South Dakota School of Mines & Technology, Rapid City
- World Fossil Finder Museum HotSprings,South Dakota. Home of Debbie Sue
- Dinosaurs of the Hell Creek Museum, Belle Fourche

== See also ==
- Dinosaur Park
