= List of lagerstätten =

The list of Lagerstätten is a documentation of Lagerstätte fossils sites around the world, arranged by geologic age. These are characterized by exceptional preservation of fossil organisms, regularly including many well-preserved animals and their soft tissue remains. The extent of Lagerstätten deposits can range from a select site or stratigraphic layer to a whole formation or group. Some sites that one author calls a single Lagerstätte may be called multiple by another (such as the Jehol Biota and the Yixian/Jiufotang Formations). This list attempts to note this in the text and provide the formation or stratigraphic unit from which a site came.

== Criteria ==
Sites on the list must either:

1. Be referred to as a Lagerstätte within the main text of at least one scientific publication. Similar terms, such as 'exceptional preservation', do not qualify.
2. Have fossils that fulfill the criteria of Konservat-Lagerstätte as set within Kimmig & Schiffbauer (2024): Konservat-Lagerstätten are characterized by exceptional preservation, and at least 5% of the fossils recovered from a site must preserve either soft tissue remains or nearly complete individuals, preferably both.

Color key
Konservat	Konzentrat	"Liberation"	Controversial

== List ==
=== Precambrian ===
Site(s)	Age	Location	Significance	Notable fossils/organisms
Francevillian B Formation	2140-2080 Ma	Franceville, Gabon	Possibly preserves the earliest macroscopic eukaryotes. However, these may instead be pseudofossils.	Example of macroscopic structure referred to the Francevillian biota
Chuanlinggou Formation	1630 Ma	Yan Mountains, North China	Preserves the first definitive multicellular eukaryotes in the form of Qingshania, Tawuia and Changchengia.	Changchengia sp.
Chitrakoot Formation	1600 Ma	Vindhya Range, India	Preserves the earliest red algae, Rafatazmia and Ramathallus	Ramathallus lobatus
Gaoyuzhuang Formation	1588.8±6.5 Ma	Yan Mountains, North China	Preserves some of the first algae such as Tuanshanzia and Grandilingulata, alongside a diverse microbiota including possible fungi.	Grandilingulata, a possible alga fossil from the Gaoyuzhuang Formation
Volyn biota	1500 Ma	Zhytomyr Oblast, Ukraine	Possibly one of the first fossil sites of the deep biosphere.	A sample of the Volyn biota with multiple filaments with claw-like ends growing from a common center
Hunting Formation	1200 Ma	Somerset Island, Canada	Shallow-water Mesoproterozoic deposits, containing multiple genera of algae including Bangiomorpha.	
Nonesuch Formation	1083-1070 Ma	Michigan, US	An oxygenated Mesoproterozoic lake containing exceptionally preserved limnic microbes.	
Lakhanda Group	1030-1000 Ma	Uchur-Maya Depression, Russia	A site preserving a Mesoproterozoic community dominated by anaerobic bacteria. The Lagerstätte contains evidence of trophic interactions from the Boring Billion.	
Bitter Springs	1000–850 Ma	South Australia	Preserved fossils include cyanobacteria microfossils.	An early stromatolite
Diabaig Formation	994 ± 48 Ma	Scotland, UK	A freshwater environment preserving phosphatic microfossils, which represent some of the oldest known non-marine eukaryotes.	
Dolores Creek Formation	950 Ma	Yukon, Canada	An Early Tonian site containing pyritised macroalgal fossils.	
Wynniatt Formation	848 ± 49–761 ± 41	Nunavut, Canada	A middle to late Tonian site, which preserves some microscopic to multiceullar algae-forms, such as Tawuia, and enigmatic forms such as Osculosphaera, in a Burgess Shale-type preservation. It also sets a soft maximum age for the appearance of metazoan organisms to around 800 Ma, which notably do not appear in any capacity within the Wynniatt Formation.	
Svanbergfjellet Formation	791.1±4.9 Ma	Svalbard, Norway	A site preserving some of the earliest green algae, such as Proterocladus, alongside various enigmatic eukaryotes like Pseudotawuia.	
Chichkan Lagerstätte	775 Ma	Kazakhstan	A site from the transition between the prokaryote-dominated biota of the Early Neoproterozoic and the eukaryote-dominated biota of the Late Neoproterozoic and Phanerozoic.	
Portfjeld Formation	570 Ma	North Greenland, Denmark	A Middle Ediacaran biota from the continent of Laurentia exhibiting Doushantuo-type preservation.	
Shuurgat Formation	Early Ediacaran	Southwestern Mongolia	A site that preserves microfossil bacterial remains within cherts.	
Khesen Formation	Ediacaran	Lake Khuvsgul, Mongolia	A Doushantuo-type microfossil assemblage that preserves bacterial remains.	
Wulingshan Lagerstätte	545-538.8 Ma	Taoyuan County, Hunan, China	A site from the middle of the larger Liuchapo Formation. The formation mainly preserves macroalgae, but lacks metazoan remains, making correlation with other sites difficult.	
Weng'an biota	609-570 Ma	Guizhou Province, China	A deposit that preserves three-dimensional remains of embryo-like animals within calcium phosphate, as well as algal and acritarch remains.	An Ediacaran acritarch
Wenghui Biota	586-557 Ma	Northeastern, Guizhou, China	A site in the upper part of the Doushantuo Formation that primarily preserves remains of macroalgae.	
Miaohe Lagerstätte	551 Ma	Yangtze Gorges Area, Hubei, China	The Miaohe Lagerstätte is within the Miaohe Member, which has historically been placed within either the Doushantuo or Dengying formations. The biota mainly preserves macroalgae and metazoans.	
Mistaken Point Ecological Reserve (including the Drook, Briscal, Mistaken Point, Trepassey, and Fermeuse Formations.)	565 Ma	Newfoundland, Canada	This site contains one of the most diverse and well-preserved collections of Precambrian fossils.	Frondose ediacaran organisms
Inner Meadow Lagerstätte	550.78 Ma	Newfoundland, Canada	The site, which is near or within the larger Fermeuse Formation, contains biota primarily known from the Avalon assemblage within White Sea assemblage aged rocks, which were also deposited during the Kotlin Crisis, the first major extinction event of the Ediacaran period.	
Itajai Biota	563 Ma	Brazil	An Ediacaran Lagerstätte preserved by volcanism.	
Ediacara Hills	555 Ma	South Australia	The type location of the Ediacaran period has preserved a significant amount of fossils from that time.	Spriggina floundersi, a worm-like organism
Shibantan Lagerstätte	551-543 Ma	Hubei, China	A terminal Ediacaran fossil assemblage preserving life forms living just before the Proterozoic-Phanerozoic transition. A part of the Dengying Formation.	
Gaojiashan Lagerstätte	551-541 Ma	Shaanxi, China	A pyrite-dominated Lagerstätte documenting tube growth patterns of Cloudina. A part of the Dengying Formation.	
Jiangchuan Biota	551-543 Ma	Yunnan, China	A latest Ediacaran macrofossil biota dominated by giant, unbranching thallophytes. Contains fauna similar to later Cambrian sites, making it an important transitional fauna. It is part of the Dengying Formation.	
Tongshan Lagerstätte	551-543 Ma	Hubei, China	A site from the terminal Ediacaran that preserves metazoans, rangeomorphs, and algal remains in Burgess-type preservation. Belongs to the larger Dengying Formation.	
Khatyspyt Lagerstätte	544 Ma	Yakutia, Russia	A Late Ediacaran Lagerstätte preserving an Avalon-type biota.	
Bernashivka open pit	?(Upper Vendian)	Vinnytsia Oblast, Ukraine	A Late Ediacaran Lagerstätte with numerous soft-bodied animals, algae, microfossils, bacteria, and fungi, comprising some different geological formations.	
Nama Group Lagerstätten	~524-539 Ma	Southern Namibia	A sequence of several Konzervat-Lagerstätten. Most of the fossils found are of Rangea, erniettomorphs, and eumetazoans. The group was probably deposited in a shallow marine environment with tidal, storm, and deltaic influence.	Pteridinium simplex from the Nama Group
Dunfee Member	Latest Ediacaran	Nevada, US	It, alongside the Esmeralda Member of The Deep Springs Formation, showcases the faunal turnover between the Ediacaran and earliest Cambrian within the same unit. Fossils found at the site include Wutubus, worms, algae, and trace fossils.	

=== Cambrian ===
Site(s)	Age	Location	Significance	Notable fossils/organisms
Esmeralda Member	Fortunian	Nevada, US	It, alongside the Dunfee Member of The Deep Springs Formation, showcases the faunal turnover between the Ediacaran and earliest Cambrian within the same unit. Fossils found include Conotubus, Cloudina, and algae.	
Zhangjiagou	Fortunian	Shaanxi, China	A Lagerstätte from the earliest Cambrian, notable for its fossils of cnidarians, cycloneuralians, and the basal ecdysozoan Saccorhytus coronarius.	Life restoration of Saccorhytus as it may have been seen through the lens of a microscope, living among grains of sand
Paseky Shale	Cambrian Stage 2	Western Czech Republic	A site that preserves arthropods including Kodymirus and Vladicaris.	
Hetang Formation	Cambrian Stage 2-Stage 3	Anhui, China	A site that preserves articulated sponge fossils and hyoliths.	
Niutitang Formation	Cambrian Stage 2-Stage 3	Guizhou and Hunan, China	A formation that preserves brachiopods, sponges, and the arthropods Isoxys and Tsunyidiscus.	
Pardailhan Formation	Lower Cambrian Stage 3	Montagne Noire, Occitania, France	A site that preserves trilobites, brachiopods, sponges, and ichnofossils.	
Maotianshan Shales (Chengjiang)	518 Ma	Yunnan, China	The preservation of an extremely diverse faunal assemblage renders the Maotianshan Shales the world's most important formation for understanding the evolution of early multi-cellular life. Microscopic animals such as Yicaris are preserved here, indicating the presence of an Orsten-type deposit within the formation. This site also includes the Xiazhuang biota.	Fossil of Fuxianhuia
Xiaoshiba Lagerstätte	Cambrian Stage 3	Yunnan, China	A site known for its detailed preservation of Early Cambrian macroalgae, alongside fossils of Omnidens. Belongs to the larger Hongjingshao Formation.	A fossil of the partial mouth apparatus of Omnidens qiongqii from the Xiaoshiba Lagerstätte, in association with a small trilobite
Malong biota	Cambrian Stage 3	Yunnan, China	Fossils found at this site include trilobites, radiodonts, vetulicolians, and hyoliths. The Lagerstätte belongs to the larger Hongjingshao Formation.	
Shuijingtuo Biota (Shuijingtuo Formation)	531-521 Ma	Hubei, China	Isoxys, trilobites, algae, radiolarians, hyoliths, and others from the approximately 45 species that have been found at the site.	
Qingjiang biota (Shuijingtuo Formation)	518 Ma	Hubei, China	This site is particularly notable for both the large proportion of new taxa represented (~53% of the specimens) and the high volume of soft-body tissue preservation.	Duplapex, a hymenocarine arthropod
Sirius Passet	523-518 Ma	Greenland, Denmark	A site known for its fauna and its most likely preservation by a death mask. It is part of the larger Buen Formation and has a fauna similar to that of the Maotianshan Shales.	Kerygmachela, a lobopodian-like dinocaridid
Fandian biota	Cambrian Stage 3	Sichuan, China	Fossils come from both the Yuxiansi and Jiuladong Formations. Overall, the faunal composition is similar to the Chengjiang fossils. Trilobites, Tuzoia, sponges, worms, and other arthropods have been found at the site.	
Souss Lagerstätte (Amouslek Formation.)	Cambrian Stage 3	Anti-Atlas, Morocco	A recently discovered site known for its trilobites, brachiopods, and hyoliths.	
Colleville Hills Biota	Cambrian Stage 3	Northwest Territories, Canada	A part of the Mount Cap Formation. This Lagerstätte is entirely known from subsurface deposits extracted from boreholes. Fossils of crustacean cuticles are preserved in exceptional detail	
Little Bear Biota	Cambrian Stage 3	Northwest Territories, Canada	A part of the Mount Cap Formation. Fossils found at this site include an anomalocaridid claw, hyoliths, and chancelloriids.	
Zawiszyn Formation	Cambrian Stage 3	Kościerzyna and Wyszków, Poland	A formation with Burgess Shale-type preservation only known from subsurface deposits discovered by boreholes. Fossils found in the formation include Peytoia infercambriensis, Liwia plana and Liwia convexa.	An interpretive drawing of the material recovered from Peytoia infercambriensis
Poleta Formation	519-518 Ma	Nevada, US	The middle member of the formation preserves the Indian Springs Lagerstätte, one of the oldest such sites from former Laurentia. This site preserves a diversity of mineralized organisms, such as trilobites and brachiopods, as well as non-mineralized remains, such as sponges, algae, and soft-bodied arthropods.	The trilobite Nevadia
Sinsk Algal Lens	518 Ma	Yakutia, Russia	One of the oldest known Cambrian Lagerstätten. The fauna of this site is unique, as it seems that they were adapted to living in dysaerobic conditions.	A reconstruction of the large lobopodian Siberion
Yanwangbian Formation	Late Stage 3 to Early Stage 4	Shaanxi, China	A site that produces many fossils of soft-bodied paleoscolecid worms.	
Guanshan Biota	Cambrian Stage 4	Eastern Yunnan, China	A relatively diverse Lagerstätte within the Wulongqing Formation, between the more famous Maotianshan Shales and Burgess Shale in age. It preserves taxa from the previous two formations in addition to distinct genera and species. It is also unusual for being quite shallow and having a brachiopod-dominated fauna.	Neobolus wulongqingensis, the most abundant taxon
Cranbrook Lagerstätte	Cambrian Stage 4	British Columbia, Canada	One of the oldest Burgess Shale-type biotas of North America. Belongs to the Eager Formation.	
Balang Biota	Cambrian Stage 4	Guizhou, China	A Lagerstätte of Burgess shale-type preservation with fossils including anomalocaridids, brachiopods, cnidarians, vetulicolians, and arthropods. It is a part of the larger Balang Formation.	A specimen of Isoxys sp. from the Balang Formation
Tsinghsutung Formation	Cambrian Stage 4	Guizhou, China	A Lagerstätte of Burgess shale-type preservation. Groups recovered from the formation include Wiwaxia, trilobites, sponges, and brachiopods.	
Skyberg Lagerstätte	Cambrian Stage 4	Mjøsa, Innlandet, Norway	A low diversity Burgess shale-type site that preserves algae, sponges, brachiopods, hyoliths, and trilobites.	
Latham Shale Lagerstätte	Cambrian Stage 4	San Bernardino, California, US	Brachiopods, trilobites, and Anomalocaris have been found within this formation.	The cephalon from Bristolia bristolensis, a trilobite
Carrara Formation	Cambrian Stage 4	Nevada, US	A site mostly known for preserving radiodonts and trilobites.	Bristolia mohavensis, a trilobite
Shipai Formation	Cambrian Stage 4	Hubei, China	Fossils, including worms, brachiopods, and Vetulicola sp. have been recovered from the formation.	
Jingshan assemblage (Shilongdong Formation)	Cambrian Stage 4	Hubei, China	A site of Burgess-type preservation. Trilobites, brachiopods, hyoliths, algae, and other arthropods have been recovered from the site.	
Tatelt Formation	515 Ma	High Atlas, Morocco	A layer in this formation has produced some of the best-preserved trilobites ever discovered, with preserved internal organs, feeding structures, and articulated appendages. The trilobites were likely rapidly buried and preserved by a volcanic eruption.	The trilobite Gigoutella mauretanica
Emu Bay Shale	513 Ma	South Australia	Noted for soft tissue mineralization, most often of blocky apatite or fibrous calcium carbonate, including the oldest phosphatized muscle tissue.	Oestokerkus, a megacheiran arthropod
Kinzers Formation	512 Ma	Pennsylvania, US	A site that preserves a diverse assemblage of radiodont and trilobite fossils.	Various fossils recovered from the formation
Ruin Wash Lagerstätte/Pioche Formation Lagerstätte	Uppermost "Dyeran" ~512 MA	Lincoln County, Nevada, US	A site that is both a Konzentrat and Konservat Lagerstätte. Known for its diverse assemblage of trilobites and other invertebrates.	A specimen of Olenellus fowleri from the Pioche Formation
Parker Slate	513-511 Ma	Vermont, US	A Burgess Shale-type biota with rare but exceptionally preserved soft-bodied animals. The earliest Burgess Shale-type biota to be described, being documented 25 years before the Burgess Shale itself.	Protocaris, an arthropod from the site
Huayuan biota	513-511 Ma	Huayuan County, Hunan Province, China	A Burgess Shale-Shale-type Lagerstätte that preserves 153 Animal species, including sponges, chancelloriids, and arthropods such as trilobites, radiodonts, marrellids, artiopods, and stem-chelicerates. It is part of the larger Balang Formation, and is roughly contemporaneous with the Balang & Guanshan biotas. It was deposited in an outer shelf setting.	
Kaili Formation	513–501 Ma	Guizhou, China	The middle part of the Kaili Formation, the Oryctocephalus indicus Zone, contains a Burgess Shale-type lagerstätte with many well-preserved fossils known collectively as the Kaili Biota.	Pararotadiscus, a cambroernid animal
Murero Lagerstätte	511-503 Ma	Spain	Fourteen biozones have been established based on its trilobite-dominated fossil content, the most precise biozonation for this time interval in the world. It also records in detail the so-called Valdemiedes event, the mass extinction episode at the end of the Lower Cambrian.	Eccaparadoxides trilobites showing sexual dimorphism
Blackberry Hill	~510–500 Ma	Central Wisconsin, US	This site preserves some of the oldest evidence of multicellular life walking out of the ocean and onto dry land (in the form of large mollusks and euthycarcinoid arthropods). Other notable fossils include stranded scyphozoans, and some of the oldest true crustaceans (in the form of phyllocarids).	Mosineia, a euthycarcinoid arthropod
Lower Conasauga Lagerstätte	Series 2 and Miaolingian	Georgia and Alabama, US	Represents fauna from an inner continental shelf environment. Red algae, sponges, trilobites, and Naraoia have been found in the site. Qualifies as a Konzentrat and Konservat Lagerstätte.	
Upper Conasauga Lagerstätte	Series 2 and Miaolingian	Georgia and Alabama, US	Represents fauna from the mid to outer continental shelf environment. Algae, sponges, and trilobites have been found in the site. Qualifies as a Konzentrat and Konservat Lagerstätte.	
Henson Gletscher Formation	Wuliuan	North Greenland, Denmark	A phosphatised Lagerstätte preserving hatching priapulid larvae, pentastomids, and abundant bradoriid and phosphatocopid arthropods.	Dietericambria, the earliest known pentastomid
Mantou Formation	Uppermost Wuliuan	Shandong, China	Fossils of Burgess-type preservation were found in the Upper Shale Member. Cambroraster, Sidneyia, trilobites, sponges, worms and bivalved arthropods were found within the formation.	
Jince Formation	Uppermost Wuliuan-Drumian	Western Czech Republic	This site is known for its preservation of lobopodians, as well as trilobites and Wiwaxia	
Buchava Formation	Drumian	Western Czech Republic	This site preserves trilobites, including those in larval stage, as well as hyoliths.	
Burgess Shale	508 Ma	British Columbia, Canada	One of the world's most famous fossil localities. It is famous for the exceptional preservation of fossil soft parts. At 508 million years old (middle Cambrian), it is one of the earliest fossil beds containing soft-part imprints.	Anomalocaris, a predatory radiodont
Duchesnay Formation	~505 Ma?	Southeastern British Columbia, Canada	Similar to the Burgess Shale above (both formations even have similar depositional environments next to escarpments), but seemingly lower-diversity and slightly younger. Several organisms are shared between both formations, although the Duchesnay Formation preserves several distinct genera. Brine pools are also preserved.	
Spence Shale	507 Ma	Northeastern Utah, Southeastern Idaho, US	A site known for its abundant Cambrian trilobites and the preservation of Burgess Shale-type fossils. The type locality for this site is Spence Gulch in southeastern Idaho.	Hyoliths, most likely lophophorates
Linyi Lagerstätte	504 Ma	Shandong, China	A Lagerstätte recognised for its exceptional preservation of arthropod limbs, intestines, and eyes. Belongs to the Zhangxia Formation.	Restoration of the Linyi Lagerstätte
Ravens Throat River Lagerstätte	Drumian	Northwest Territories, Canada	A Burgess Shale-type biota coeval in age with the more famous Wheeler Shale and Marjum Formation. The site is a part of the larger Rockslide Formation.	
Wheeler Shale (House Range)	504 Ma	Western Utah, US	A famous locality known for its prolific agnostid and Elrathia kingii trilobite remains. Varied soft-bodied organisms are also locally preserved, including Naraoia, Wiwaxia , and Hallucigenia.	Elrathia sp. trilobites
Marjum Formation	502 Ma	Western Utah, US	A site known for its diverse assemblage and occasional preservation of soft tissue.	Branchiocaris a pelagic hymenocarine
Weeks Formation	500 Ma	Western Utah, US	A site that is dominated by trilobites and brachiopods, but also comprises various soft-bodied organisms, such as Falcatamacaris.	Beckwithia, an aglaspidid trilobite relative
Kinnekulle Orsten and Alum Shale	500 Ma	Sweden	The Orsten sites reveal the oldest well-documented benthic meiofauna in the fossil record. Known fossils include microfossils of arthropods like free-living pentastomids. Multiple "Orsten-type" Lagerstätten are also known from other countries.	Cambropachycope, a stem-group mandibulate arthropod
Fulu Lagerstätte	498.5 Ma (late Guzhangian)	Yunnan, China	Trilobites, bivalves, macroalgae, worms, and echinoderms are known from this site.	
Potsdam Sandstone	Furongian	Québec, Canada and New York, US	A site that produces three-dimensionally preserved arthropods such as Mictomerus within sandstone, a style of preservation rarely seen outside the Ediacaran.	
Kimiltei Lagerstätte	492-491 Ma	Irkutsk Oblast, Russia	A site that preserves chasmataspidids.	
Wangcun Lagerstätte	Paibian	Hunan, China	A site that preserves fossilized embryos and other microfauna. Belongs to the Bitiao Formation.	
Guole Biota	491.5 Ma (Jiangshanian)	Guangxi, China	A site known for its preservation of cnidarians, hyoliths, echinoderms, palaeoscolecids, arthropods, including trilobites, and algae. Belongs to the Sandu Formation.	

=== Silurian ===
Site(s)	Age	Location	Significance	Notable fossils/organisms
Kalana Lagerstätte	~440 Ma; Aeronian	Estonia	Known for well preserved fossils of algae and crinoids, along with an osteostracan fossilised via an extremely unusual carbonaceous mode of preservation that was previously unknown among vertebrates.	Kalanaspis, the earliest known osteostracan
Chongqing Lagerstätte	436 Ma	Chongqing, China	This site preserved complete fossils of earliest jawed vertebrates, as well as some galeaspids and eurypterids. Belongs to the Huixingshao Formation.	Xiushanosteus, the earliest placoderm
Waukesha Biota (Brandon Bridge Formation)	~435 Ma; Early Silurian	Wisconsin, US	Well-studied site known for the exceptional preservation of its diverse, soft-bodied, and lightly skeletonized fauna, includes many major taxa found nowhere else in strata of similar age. It was one of the first fossil sites with soft-bodied preservation known to science.	Parioscorpio, an enigmatic arthropod
Pentland Hills Eurypterid Bed	Upper Llandovery	Midlothian, Scotland, UK	Articulated crinoids, bryozoans, brachiopods, trilobites, ostracods, cnidarians, gastropods, bivlaves, echinoderms, algae, and several eurypterids, including Drepanopterus, Pentlandopterus, have been found at the site. Belongs to the Reservoir Formation.	Drepanopterus pentlandicus, a Eurypterid discovered from the site.
Fentou Biota	Telychian	Wuhan, Hubei, China.	A formation that contains two distinct assemblages. The first assemblage was deposited within a shallow, low-latitude littoral sea, and the second was deposited within an estuary or deltaic environment. The first assemblage primarily consists of sponges, arthropods, and echinoderm fossils, while the second assemblage preserves more fish and eurypterids, as well as conulariids and some algal remains.	
Patrick Burn Formation	Upper Telychian to Lower Sheinwoodian	Dumfries and Galloway, Scotland, UK	A sitemthat has produced several invertebrates, including thylacocephalans, synziphosurs, eurypterids, thelodonts, and the enigmatic chordate Jamoytius. Due to looting, the locality is no longer productive.	A photograph of Ainiktozoon, an early thylacocephalan
Thorton Lagerstätte	Sheinwoodian	Illinois, US	Well-preserved fossils of graptolites, conodonts, and chitinozoans are known from this site. This site was deposited within the Racine Formation.	
Massie Formation	Sheinwoodian	Indiana, US	A site that preserves detailed diploporitans.	Holocystites from the Massie Formation.
Scotch Grove Formation	Sheinwoodian	Iowa, US	A site that is notable for its excellent preservation of xiphosurans and other arthropods. Fossils of worms and the soft parts of conulariids have also been documented from the formation.	The holotype of Camanchia grovensis
Herefordshire Lagerstätte (Coalbrookdale Formation)	~430 Ma	Herefordshire, UK	Known for the well-preserved fossils of various invertebrate animals, many of which are in their three-dimensional structures. Fossils are preserved within volcanic ash, because of that sometimes this site has been compared to Pompeii. Some of the fossils are regarded as earliest evidences and evolutionary origin of some of the major groups of modern animals.	Offacolus, a euchelicerate
Wren's Nest (Much Wenlock Limestone)	Homerian	Dudley, West Midlands, UK	A site that preserves fossilized crinoids, trilobites, and other fossil organisms.	Various fossils from Wren's Nest
Waldron Shale	Homerian	Indiana, US	A "Butter Shale"-style Lagerstätte that preserves crinoids and trilobites.	Calymene breviceps from the Waldron Shale.
Mississinewa Shale	Homerian-Gorstian boundary	Indiana, US	A formation known for its dendroid graptolites. Other organisms found at the site include cephalopods, trilobites, crinoids, bryozoans, bivalves, and worm remains	
Lecthaylus Lagerstätte	Gorstian	Illinois, US	A site mainly known for its preservation of worms, like those in the genus Lecthaylus, which gave the lagerstätte its name. Graptolites, cnidarians, phylocarids, and cephalopods are also known from the site. This site was deposited within the Racine Formation.	A specimen of Lecthaylus gregarius from Illinois
Goat Island Formation	Gorstian	New York, US	A site mainly known for its exceptional preservation of the algae fossil Medusagraptus in situ within stagnant water. A deposit within the formation that preserved graptolites, algae, and worm fossils was dubbed the Gasport "Channel" but future work found the deposit was not a restricted channel deposit, and instead stretched over 100 km. The thin 10–20 cm that was formerly referred to as the Gasport "Channel" is now referred to as the Medusaegraptus Epibole.	A specimen of Medusagraptus mirabilis
Eramosa Lagerstätte	~425 Ma	Ontario & New York (state), Canada and US	Known for preservation of both hard and soft-bodied organisms in great detail, including early scorpions, eurypterids, agnathan vertebrates, and several other species. Includes the Hepworth, Wiarton, and Park Head biotas/localities.	Eramoscorpius, an early scorpion
Bjärsjölagård Limestone	Ludfordian	Skåne, Sweden	An "algal-Lagerstätte" within the Klinta Formation. Mainly preserves non-calcified algae within the genus Chaetocladus.	
Pointe-aux-Chenes Shale	Přídolí	Michigan, US	Fossils are rare within the formation. Regardless, eurypterids, brachiopods, and algae have been found in the formation.	
Waubakee Dolomite	Přídolí	Wisconsin, US	Most of this formation doesn't preserve fossils. A few selected site, however, preserve ostracods, brachiopods, phyllocarids, and cephalopods.	
Kokomo Limestone	Přídolí	Indiana, US	A member of the Salina Formation. Ostracods, conodonts, brachiopods, and eurypterids that correlate with fauna from the Bertie Group. Overall, the formation is not very fossiliferous.	Carcinosoma newlini, a eurypterid from the Kokomo Formation.
Syracuse Formation	Přídolí	New York, US	Many eurypterid fossils, brachiopods, bivalves, graptolites have been found from the formation.	
Downton Bone Bed	423–424 Ma	Shropshire, Herefordshire, and Buckinghamshire, UK	A very large Konzentrat-Lagerstätte known mostly for its shelled invertebrates like bivalves, gastropods, and ostracods.	
Bertie Group	422.9-416 Ma	Ontario & New York State, Canada and US	This limestone has produced thousands of fossil eurypterids, such as the giant Acutiramus and the well-known Eurypterus, as well as other fauna, including scorpions and fish. The group includes both the Williamsville and Fiddlers Green Formations.	Nerepisacanthus, an acanthodian
Tonoloway Formation	~420 Ma	Pennsylvania, US	Known from an exceptionally preserved mass assemblage of Eurypterus, the most abundant eurypterid in the fossil record.	Reconstruction of Eurypterus
Rochester Shale	415 Ma	Ontario and New York, Canada and US	Echinoderms (such as crinoids) and trilobites are known from the Lewiston Member in this shale. Has "Butter Shale"-type preservation.	Arctinurus, a trilobite

=== Devonian ===
Site(s)	Age	Location	Significance	Notable fossils/organisms
Tredomen Quarry	Lower Lochkovian	Southern Powys, Wales, UK	A site from the St. Maughans Formation of the Lower Old Red Sandstone that preserves plants such as Cooksonia, as well as invertebrates, like the trigonotarbid Arianrhoda bennetti.	
Ditton Group	Lochkovian	Wales, UK	A wildfire-derived Lagerstätte containing pyrolysis products of ancient wildfires.	
Birdsong Shale	Lochkovian	Western Tennessee, US	A trilobite Lagerstätte.	
MOTH locality	Lochkovian	Northwest Territories, Canada	A marine Lagerstätte known for its complete fossils of early fish such as acanthodians, osteostracans, furcacaudiform thelodonts, and pteraspidomorphs. Most species from the site are found nowhere else.	The "Wonder Block", a slab of limestone preserving 7 different species in one place
Rhynie chert	400 Ma	Scotland, UK	The Rhynie chert contains exceptionally preserved plant, fungus, lichen, and animal material (euthycarcinoids, branchiopods, arachnids, hexapods, etc.) preserved in place by an overlying volcanic deposit and hot springs. It is also one of the first known fully terrestrial ecosystems.	Asteroxylon, an early vascular plant related to lycopods
Martelange Member	Pragian	Neufchâteau, Luxembourg, Belgium	A Konservat-Lagerstätte from a now flooded quarry, discovered from a disused soil heap that preserves pyritized fossils, including cephalopods, bivalves, trilobites, potential blastozoans, stylophorans and selkirkiid priapulids. This deposit is similar to other deposits from the Rhenish Massif and was most likely deposited in a near-shore marine environment within turbid water. Belongs to the La Roche Formation.	
Alken-an-der-Mosel	Lower Emsian	Rhineland-Palatinate, Germany	A site was probably deposited in a lagoonal setting bordering an island with large tidal flats. with mangrove-like vegetation bordering the site. A diverse assemblage of plants, bivalves, eurypterids, trigonotarbids, and various other arthropods. Belongs to the Nellenköpfchen Formation.	
Consthum Lagerstätte	Early to Middle Emsian, ~400 Ma	Luxembourg	A coastal assemblage including the Consthum I and II units. Fossils found from the site include early land plants, bivalves, eurypterids, trilobites, and fish remains.	A restoration of the Consthum Lagerstätte
Haragan Formation	Emsian	Oklahoma, US	A trilobite Lagerstätte.	Huntoniatonia, a trilobite
Khebchia Formation	Emsian	Draa Valley, Morocco	A Lagerstätte known for trilobites such as Hollardops, Phacops, Psychopyge, and Scabriscutellum.	
Ponta Grossa Formation	Emsian-early Frasnian	Northwest Paraná Basin, Brazil	An echinoderm Lagerstätte that preserves death assemblages of articulated fossil brittle stars in Burgess-type preservation.	
Waxweiler Lagerstätte	409-392 Ma	Eifel, Germany	Waxweiler Lagerstätte is known from well-preserved fossils of chelicerates, giant claw of Jaekelopterus rhenaniae shows the largest arthropod ever known. The site belongs to the larger Klerf Formation.	Jaekelopterus, a ~2.5 m-long eurypterid
Willwerath Lagerstätte	Emsian	Rhineland-Palatinate, Germany	A site mainly known for its diverse assemblage of eurypterids, plants, and vertebrate remains is also well-known. The site belongs to the larger Klerf Formation.	a drawing of the holotype of Pruemopterus, a eurypterid from the site
Heckelmann Mill	395 Ma	Rhineland-Palatinate, Germany	Heckelmann Mill preserves well preserved rhinocaridid archaeostracan phyllocarids, along with exceptionally abundant crinoid holdfasts from the late Emsian.	
Hunsrück Slate (Bundenbach)	~389.9-387.5 Ma	Rheinland-Pfalz, Germany	The Hunsrück slates are one of the few marine Devonian Lagerstätten with soft tissue preservation, and in many cases, fossils are coated by a pyritic surface layer.	Schinderhannes bartelsi, the youngest known radiodont
Mur des douaniers	Eifelian	Ardennes, France	A site that primarily preserves trilobites and other marine organisms.	
Needmore Shale	Givetian	Pennsylvania and Maryland, US	A trilobite Lagerstätte.	
Hamilton Group	Givetian	New York, US	A trilobite Lagerstätte.	
Gilboa Mudstones (Panther Mountain Formation)	Givetian	New York, US	A site known for its exceptional preservation of fossilised arachnids and myriapods. Contains the fossil remains of one of the earliest known lycopod forests.	Microdecemplex, a myriapod from the Panther Mountain Formation.
Red Hill I	Givetian	Eureka County, Nevada, US	A site deposited within a marine, near-shore environment that preserves well-preserved remains of sponges, conullarids, brachiopods, echinoderms, as well as those of fish and plants.	
Arkona Shale	~385 Ma (Early Givetian)	Ontario, Canada	Mostly known for its low diversity crinoid Lagerstätte, however, the pyritized polychaete Arkonips has also been found here.	
Gogo Formation	380 Ma (Frasnian)	Western Australia	The fossils of the Gogo Formation display three-dimensional soft-tissue preservation of tissues as fragile as nerves and embryos with umbilical cords. Over fifty species of fish have been described from the formation, as well as many arthropods.	Materpiscis, a ptyctodontid placoderm fish that is the oldest vertebrate known to give live birth
Miguasha National Park (Escuminac Formation)	370 Ma	Québec, Canada	Some of the fish, fauna, and spore fossils found at Miguasha are rare and ancient species. For example, Eusthenopteron is a sarcopterygian that shares characters with early tetrapods.	Fossil of lungfish Scaumenacia and antiarch placoderm Bothriolepis
Kowala Lagerstätte	~368 Ma	Świętokrzyskie Voivodeship, Poland	A Late Devonian site known for its fossils of non-biomineralised algae and arthropods.	
The Thylacocephalan Layer	368 Ma	Anti-Atlas, Morocco	A site that was deposited within Maïder Basin. it provides well-preserved fossils of Famennian fauna, including chondrichthyans and placoderms that preserved soft tissues.	Amazichthys, pelagic placoderm with preserved soft tissue
Xinhang forest	Famennian	Guangde, Anhui, China	A fossil forest found within the Jianchuan and Yongchuan mines, which spans 0.25 square kilometres (2,700,000 sq ft). This forest was deposited within low-latitude wetland conditions near the coast. In situ lycopsids and fern-like organisms, including ovulae, are preserved.	
Hangenberg Black Shale	latest Famennian	Anti-Atlas, Morocco	A site that was deposited within Maïder Basin. This Monte San Giorgio type deposit is mostly known for its exceptionally preserved cephalopods, including ammonoids and orthocones with preserved mandibles.	
Aoufilal Formation	Uppermost Famennian	Eastern Anti-Atlas, Morocco	An ichnofossil Lagerstätte that was deposited within a nearshore shelf environment. Eurypterid trackways & feeding traces, crustacean and arthropod trackways, including resting traces, fish trails, and burrows, have been recovered from the site.	
Huron Shale Member	Frasnian	Ohio, US	Fossils were preserved in a stagnant basin, like those from the Jurassic Posidonia Shale. Sarcopterygians, placoderms, Onchodus, and various other bony fish have been recovered at the locality.	
Strud (Evieux Formation)	? (Late Famennian)	Namur Province, Belgium	Mainly juvenile placoderms are known, suggesting this site would be a nursery site for placoderms. Various biota like tetrapods, arthropods, and plants are also known, Strudiella from this site may be the earliest insect, but its affinity is disputed.	Strudops, the earliest known notostracan
Mandagery Sandstone	360 Ma	New South Wales, Australia	A Lagerstätte accidentally discovered near Canowindra. known for its exceptional preservation and density of sarcopterygian and placoderm fish.	Mandageria, a lobe-finned fish which is the State Fossil Emblem of New South Wales, Australia
Waterloo Farm Lagerstätte (Witpoort Formation)	360 Ma	South Africa	Important site that provides the only record of a high latitude (near polar) coastal ecosystem, overturning numerous assumptions about high latitude conditions during the latest Devonian.	Priscomyzon, the oldest known genus of lamprey

=== Carboniferous ===
Site(s)	Age	Location	Significance	Notable fossils/organisms
Cromhall Quarr y	Courceyan-Chadian	Gloucestershire, England, UK	A site where Carboniferous shark remains have been concentrated within residues of a Triassic karst system.	
Granton Shrimp Bed	? (Dinantian)	Firth of Forth, Scotland, UK	Dominated by well-preserved crustacean fossils, this site provided first body fossil of Clydagnathus which solved long-lasted mystery of conodont fossils.	
Loch Humphrey Burn lagerstätte	Tournaisian	Kilpatrick Hills, Scotland, UK	A site that preserves numerous plants in volcanics	
Oxroad Bay Tuff	Tournaisian	Scotland, UK	A volcanic-influenced Carboniferous plant Lagerstätte.	
Crawfordsville Lagerstätte	Upper Osagean	Crawfordsville, Indiana, US	A site from the Edwardsville Formation that preserves articulated crinoids within the Borden deltaic complex.	
Clyde Plateau Volcanics Formation	Viséan	Scotland, UK	A volcanic-influenced Carboniferous plant Lagerstätte.	
Molignée Formation	Viséan	Denée, Belgium	A site within black marble that preserves fossils within a marine basin. Bony fish, articulated crinoids, other echinoderms, ammonoids, conularids, sponges, and plants have been recovered from the formation.	
Glencartholm lagerstätte	Viséan	Dumfriesshire, Scotland, UK	A volcanic bed that preserves brachiopods, fish, and plant remains.	
Akkermanovka-Khabarnoe	Upper Viséan	Orenburg, Russia	A reef community that preserves brachiopods, corals, ammonites, and trilobites within limestone.	
East Kirkton Quarry	335 Ma	West Lothian, Scotland, UK	This site has produced numerous well-preserved fossils of early tetrapods like temnospondyls and reptiliomorphs, and large arthropods like scorpions and eurypterids.	Silvanerpeton, a possible reptiliomorph
Pettycur Lagerstätte	335-329 Ma	Fife, Scotland, UK	A maar site known for its exceptional preservation of fossil plants within a peat swamp.	
Pride Mountain Flora	Lower Serpukhovian	Colbert County, Alabama, US	A site producing flora within the upper portion of the Pride Mountain Formation, which was deposited in a salt marsh setting. The deposit is unique for producing permineralized and compression fossils of different plant organs, including rootlets, leaves, sporophylls, and other delicate tissues.	
Hartselle Sandstone	Chesterian	Northern Alabama, US	An interval within this formation produces a diverse Konservat-Lagerstätte.	
Avion locality	Serpukhovian to Moscovian	Pas-de-Calais, France	A now inaccessible site that preserves insect remains, including the earliest known thrips and titanopterans.	Theiatitan, the earliest known titanopteran
Bear Gulch Limestone	324 Ma	Montana, US		Falcatus, a holocephalian which males had large fin spine
Wamsutta Formation	~320-318 Ma	Massachusetts, US	A subhumid alluvial fan deposit that preserves ichnofossils, plants, invertebrates, and vertebrates.	
Union Chapel Mine Site	Lower Pennsylvanian	Alabama, US	An ichnofossil site that preserves a great diversity and number of tetrapod trackways within a coastal environment.	
Hagen-Vorhalle Lagerstätte	~319-310 Ma (Bashkirian)	North Rhine-Westphalia, Germany	A nearshore marine site that preserves Pennsylvanian insects and bivalves.	
Xiaheyan locality	Latest Bashkirian to Middle Moscovian	Ningxia, China	An interdeltaic bay site preserving insects and other arthropods in fine, laminated shales. Is a part of the larger Yanghugou Formation.	Miamia, an archaeorthopteran
Bickershaw	? (Langsettian)	Lancashire, UK	This locality contains exceptionally preserved fossils within nodules. Arthropods exhibit greater diversity, with many species that were aquatic and lived in a brackish environment.	Valloisella, a xiphosuran
Wigan Four Foot Coal Seam	Langsettian	Lancashire, UK	Bivalves, arachnids, xiphosurans, myriapods, crustaceans, and a fish are known from the site.	
Coseley Lagerstätte	Duckmantian	West Midlands, UK	A deltaic environment preserving millipedes and arachnids. The site has been compared to the more famous Mazon Creek Lagerstätte. A part of the Coal Measures Lagerstätten.	
Tyne Coalfield	Duckmantian	Durham, UK	A Lagerstätten that preserves a record of fossil arthropods, including myriapods, arachnids, merostomatans, and insects. Fish have also been found at the site.	
Sparth Bottoms Lagerstätte	318-315 Ma	Lancashire, UK	A potential swamp pool or lagoonal deposit that preserves insects, arachnids, annelid worms, fish, myriapods, and crustaceans. A part of the Coal Measures Lagerstätten.	
Coalbrookdale Coalfield Lagerstätte	Westphalian	Shropshire, UK	Plants are known from the site. A part of the Coal Measures Lagerstätten.	
Sosnowiec-Zagórze Lagerstätte	Westphalian	Upper Silesia, Poland	A coal seam that preserves many plant fossils, as well as those of xiphosurans, eurypterids, molluscs, myriapods, arachnids, and fish.	
Writhlington Lagerstätten	Westphalian D	Radstock, Somerset, UK	Adelophthalmus, A part of the Coal Measures Lagerstätten. A large diversity of insects and plants is known from the site.	
Piesberg Lagerstätte	Westphalian D	Osnabrück, Lower Saxony, Germany	Xiphosuraans, scorpions, trigonotarbids, spiders, and numerous species of insects have been found here.	
Joggins Fossil Cliffs (Joggins Formation)	315 Ma	Nova Scotia, Canada	A fossil site that preserves a diverse terrestrial ecosystem consisting of plants like lycopsids, giant arthropods, fish, and reptiliomorphs such as Hylonomus.	Model of Hylonomus, a pan-amniote
Kladno Formation (Radnice and Nýřany Members.)	Westphalian (stage)	Plzeň, Czech Republic	A site known for its temnospondyls, aistopods, fish, and myriapods.	
Castlecomer fauna	315-307 Ma	Kilkenny, Ireland	A Konservat-Lagerstätte with a high number of well-preserved spinicaudatan clam shrimp. Was deposited within the Leinster Coalfield.	
The Jarrow Assemblage	313-291 Ma	Kilkenny, Ireland	A site within the Leinster Coalfield known for its preservation of coalified fish and temnospondyl amphibians.	A restoration of Keraterpeton, a nectridean
Linton Diamond Coal Mine	310 Ma	Ohio, US	A site known for its number of prehistoric tetrapods, like the lepospondyl Diceratosaurus.	The lepospondyl tetrapod Diceratosaurus
Mazon Creek	310 Ma	Illinois, US	A conservation Lagerstätte found near Morris, in Grundy County, Illinois. The fossils from this site are preserved in ironstone concretions with exceptional detail. The fossils were preserved in a large delta system that covered much of the area. The state fossil of Illinois, the enigmatic animal Tullimonstrum, is only known from these deposits.	Tullimonstrum, an enigmatic animal
Buckhorn Asphalt Quarry	~310 Ma	Oklahoma, US	A quarry of the Boggy Formation known for its exceptionally rich orthocerid assemblage. A rare example of a fossil site where fossils where impregnated by hydrocarbons during diagenesis Fulfills the criteria of a "Liberation Lagerstätte".^{see notes}	
Kinney Brick Quarry	around 307 Ma	New Mexico, US	This site is known for rich fish fossils with preserved soft tissues, which lived in a lagoonal environment. Dozens of fish genera are known, ranging from chondrichthyans like ctenacanths and hybodonts, to actinopterygians and sarcopterygians. Is a part of the Atrasado Formation.	Dracopristis, a ctenacanth
Tinajas Lagerstätte	Kasimovian	New Mexico, US	A site mostly known for its preservation of regurgitalites and coprolites. It is a part of the Atrasado Formation.	
Sydney Coalfield	Kasimovian	Nova Scotia, Canada	A site during the Carboniferous Rainforest Collapse that preserves flora from a Medullosalean forest with preserved fossil cuticles.	
Lontras Shale (Campáleo Outcrop)	Gzhelian	Santa Catarina, Brazil	A fungal and palynological Lagerstätte from Gondwana during Late Palaeozoic Ice Age.	
Commentry	Stephanian	Allier, France	Important insect fossil Lagerstätte: Meganeura fossils from this site are among the largest insects known.	Meganeura, a giant griffinfly
Garnett Lagerstätte	305 Ma	Kansas, US	A site known for its plants, vertebrates, and invertebrates.	
Montceau-les-Mines	300 Ma	France	Exceptional preservation of Late Carboniferous fossil biota is known, including various vertebrates and arthropods, as well as plants.	Idmonarachne, an arachnid that is related to spiders
Hamilton Quarry	300 Ma	Kansas, US	This site is known for its diverse assemblage of unusually well-preserved marine, euryhaline, freshwater, flying, and terrestrial fossils (invertebrates, vertebrates, and plants). This extraordinary mix of fossils suggests it was once an estuary.	Spinoaequalis, a semi-aquatic sauropsid
Robinson Locality	Virgilian series	Kansas, US	A Konzentrat-Lagerstätte within a lagoonal or bay environment with vertebrate fossils.	
Lawrence Formation	Virgilian series	Kansas, US	Mostly known for its xiphosurans preserved in siderite.	
Finis Shale Member	Virgilian series	Texas, US	A proposed "Liberation Lagerstätte"^{see notes} characterized by its bryozoan fauna	
Barnsdall Formation	Missourian Stage	Washington County, Oklahoma, US	A Konzentrat-Lagerstätte that preserves thousands of crinoid specimens, with a notable amount having complete crowns.	
Carrizo Arroyo	? (Latest Gzhelian to earliest Asselian)	New Mexico, US	This site is known for exceptional preservation of arthropod fossils, mainly insects. There are two preserved Lagerstätten intervals at the site at 43 metres (141 ft) and 68 metres (223 ft) above the base of the Bursum Formation. The deposit represents a lacustrine environment.	
Pramollo ichnolagerstätte	Kasimovian-Gzhelian	Carnic Alps, Austria & Italy	An ichnofossil site occurring across the Austria-Italy border that was deposited in a diverse array of environments, including estuarine, deltaic, and offshore deposits. Numerous ichnotaxa have been described from the site.	
Pony Creek Shale Lagerstätte	Late Pennsylvanian	Eastern Kansas, US	Known for xiphosurans with associated ichnofossils. It is a part of the Wood Siding Formation.	
Remigiusberg Formation	300.0 Ma ± 2.4 Ma	Saarland and Rhineland-Palatinate, Germany	A Permian-Carboniferous site known for its excellent preservation of fossil plants, invertebrates, and vertebrates in fluvial to marginal lacustrine deposits.	Trypanognathus, a temnospondyl amphibian

=== Permian ===
Site(s)	Age	Location	Significance	Notable fossils/organisms
Manebach Formation	299-297.5 Ma	Thuringia, Germany	A lacustrine (lake) ecosystem that fossilizes stromatolites, a wide diversity of plants, invertebrates, and remains of vertebrates, like temnospondyls and fish.	Fern leaves from the formation.
Taiyuan Formation	298 Ma	Inner Mongolia, China	Known from exceptionally well-preserved plant fossils in volcanic ash.	
Börtewitz Formation	Asselian	Saxony, Germany	A fossil lake within the Saxony Basin that preserves hundreds of specimens of branchiosaurid temnospondyls of the genera Melanerpeton and Schoenfelderpeton. One specimen of Melanerpeton preserves extensive color patterning.	
Meisenheim Formation	?(Asselian to early Sakmarian)	Lebach, Germany	This site is well known for the rich occurrence of fauna that lived in large freshwater lakes, including fish, temnospondyls, insects, and others.	Lebachacanthus, a large xenacanth
Bromacker Quarry	294.5-293.7 Ma	Thuringia, Germany	A very productive early Permian lagerstätte that preserves articulated remains of tetrapods, including Seymouria, Dimetrodon, Eudibamus, Diadectes, and Orobates. Extensive, well-preserved trackways have also been discovered that allow for direct comparisons with their trackmakers. Invertebrate and plant remains have also been discovered. The Bromacker site was deposited in a prehistoric upland, graben environment. The site belongs to the larger Tambach Formation.	The holotype of Orobates, a diadectid
Franchesse Lagerstätte	292 Ma	Massif Central, France	A Sakmarian seymouriamorph lagerstätte from the Bourbon l'Archambault Basin in the French Massif Central containing hundreds of complete seymouriamorph specimens.	
Chemnitz petrified forest	291 Ma	Saxony, Germany	A petrified forest in Germany that is composed of Arthropitys bistriata, a type of calamitacean, giant horsetails that are ancestors of modern species, found in this location with never-before-seen multiple branches. Many more plants and animals from this excavation are still under ongoing research.	Large trunks of Arthropitys at Chemnitz
Elmo Fossil Site	Artinskian	Elmo, Dickinson County, Kansas, US	A site from the Wellington Formation that preserves numerous species of fossil invertebrates, with over 150 species of insects recovered from the site, from tens of thousands of specimens collected. Animals range in size from in forewing length of 1.9 millimetres (0.075 in) to Meganeuropsis, one of the largest flying insects ever found. The fossil site was most likely deposited within freshwater lakes or ponds.	A restoration of the meganeurid Meganeuropsis
Midco Fossil Beds	Artinskian	Noble County, Oklahoma, US	A site from the Wellington Formation that preserves numerous species of fossil invertebrates. It is less diverse than Elmo and was discovered 30 years after the beds at Elmo were discovered. Regardless, more than 70 insect species have been recovered from the site. Unlike Elmo, the fossil beds at Midco were most likely deposited within a perennial saline lake or an ephemeral playa lake.	
Richards Spur	Artinskian	Comanche County, Oklahoma, US	An upland environment deposited within a filled-in fissue. Well-preserved animals, including captorhinids, sauropsids, temnospondyls, and recumbirostrans have been recovered.	Artificially assembled Captorhinus aguti fossils
Mangrullo Formation	about 285–275 Ma (Artinskian)	Brazil, Uruguay	This site is known for its abundant mesosaur fossils. It contains fossils of the earliest known amniote embryos.	Mesosaurus (Stereosternum), an aquatic-adapted sauropsid
Prehistoric Trackways National Monument	Artinskian	Doña Ana County, New Mexico, US	A site that preserves a large diversity of well-preserved fossil trackways.	A track from the site
Cundlego Formation	late Artinskian	Western Australia, Australia	An obtrusion Lagerstätte known for its exceptional preservation of articulated crinoids. It was deposited in a marine environment dominated by storms.	A slab containing the crinoid Jimbacrinus bostocki
Philippovskoe Bus-stop locality	Lower Kungurian	Perm Krai, Russia	A low diversity lagoonal site that mainly preserves algae, marattiaceaens, conifers, ginkgos, and bivalves.	
Philippovskian Quarry	Lower Kungurian	Perm Krai, Russia	A low diversity lagoonal site that mainly preserves algae, marattiaceaens, conifers, ginkgos, and bivalves.	
Kamai locality	Lower Kungurian	Perm Krai, Russia	A low diversity lagoonal site that produces algae, conifers, an indeterminate polychaete, bivalves, gastropods, and Paleolimulus.	
Kiselevo-Suksun Highway locality	Lower Kungurian	Perm Krai, Russia	A low diversity lagoonal site that preserves horsetails, bryozoans, and brachiopods.	
Iratí Formation	Kungurian	Paraná Basin, Brazil	A site very similar to the Mangrullo Formation from the same region. The formation preserves mesosaurs in detail, along with coprolites that showcase mesosaur diet. Fish and crustaceans are also known from the formation.	Mesosaurus (Brazilosaurus) fossil
Lek-Vorkuta Formation	Kungurian	Komi Republic, Russia	A formation known from subsurface coal deposits. Annelids, several species of insects, and plants are known from the deposit.	
Chekarda (Koshelevka Formation)	about 283–273 Ma	Perm, Russia	Over 260 species of insect species are described from this site as well as diverse taxa of plants, making it one of the most important Permian Konservat-Lagerstätten.	Tshekardocoleidae beetle larva
Motuca Formation	Kungurian	Tocantins, Brazil	The formation housing the Tocantins Fossil Trees Natural Monument. Well-preserved plant fossils are common here.	
Toploje Member	273-264 Ma	Prince Charles Mountains, Antarctica	This site preserves a high-latitude fauna in an exceptional position before the large extinctions that happened later in the Permian.	
Taddart Lagerstätte	270-260 Ma	Marrakech High Atlas, Morocco	A site from the lower Cham-el-Houa Siltstone Formation that was deposited within a sequence of sandstones, mudstones, and siltstones, deposited within a freshwater lacustrine environment. Remains of freshwater jellyfish have been recovered from the deposit.	
Onder Karoo	266.9–264.28 Ma	Karoo Basin, South Africa	A high latitude, cool-temperate lacustrine ecosystem preserving detailed plant and insect fossils.	
Kuedinskie Kluchiki	Late Ufimian	Perm Krai, Russia	A deposit that preserves mollusks, arthropods, insects, and phyllopod remains, as well as those of plants and vertebrates, including temnospondyls and fish. It was probably deposited in a low-lying brackish lagoon or lake environment, disconnected from marine influence. This locality is notably younger than other similar Lagerstätten within the region.	
Word Formation	Wordian	Texas, US	A proposed "Liberation Lagerstätte".^{see notes} Fossils recovered from the site include ammonoids, gastropods, crinoids, brachiopods, and bivalve remains.	Small fossils from the formation.
Sakamena Group	260–247 Ma	Madagascar	The Lower Sakamena Formation (Permian) and Middle Sakamena Formation (Triassic) contain fossils of animals that lived around a wetland environment, such as semi-aquatic and gliding neodiapsids.	Claudiosaurus, aquatic neodiapsid reptile
Isady (Poldarsa Formation)	Wuchiapingian	Vologda oblast, Russia	A site that preserves plants, bivalves, ostracods, scorpions, fish scales, remains of tetrapods and insects. The insects are dominated by cockroaches plus other groups.	
Kupferschiefer	259–255 Ma	(North-Central Europe) Denmark, Germany, Lithuania, Netherlands, Poland, Russia	This site, deposited in an open marine and shallow marine environment, provides fossils of reptiles as well as many fish.	Fossil of Weigeltisaurus, a gliding weigeltisaurid reptile
Huopu Lagerstätte	~255 Ma	Guizhou, China	A plant fossil site documenting floral dynamics between the end-Guadalupian and end-Permian extinction events.	
Karaungir Lagerstätte (Maychat and Akkolka Formations)	Lopingian	Eastern Kazakhstan	A site that preserves insects, including numerous earthworm cocoons preserved in freshwater strata.	

=== Jurassic ===
Site(s)	Age	Location	Significance	Notable fossils/organisms
Yuzhou Biota (Ziliujing Formation)	~199 Ma	Chongqing, China	A fossil biota representing an extremely well-preserved lake ecosystem with freshwater mollusks, ray-finned fishes, lungfishes, sharks, and even pliosauroids, documenting one of the earliest well-preserved terrestrial ecosystems from Asia following the Triassic-Jurassic extinction event.	Bishanopliosaurus, a freshwater pliosaur
Bed 29 (Blue Lias)/Lyme Regis Lagerstätte	Hettangian	Lyme Regis, UK	A Konzentrat site that preserves a death assemblage of ammonites.	
Westfield Bed Lagerstätte	Hettangian	Connecticut & Massachusetts, US	A site within the East Berlin Formation that preserves exceptional remains of fishes, including the genus Redfieldius.	
Dinosaur State Park	Early Hettangian	Rocky Hill, Connecticut, US	A trackway Lagerstätte most likely formed from animals moving across soft sediment covered in a thick microbial mat. Eubrontes, Grallator are common at the site.	Trackways of Eubrontes from the site.
Riker Hill Quarry	Early Hettangian	Roseland, New Jersey, US	A trackway Lagerstätte.	
Portland Brownstone Quarries	Middle Hettangian	Portland,Connecticut, US	A trackway Lagerstätte deposited within a shallow, lacustrine environment.	
Middlefield Lagerstätte	Hettangian	Middlefield, Connecticut, US	A site within the Portland Formation that preserves fish remains, including the genus Redfieldius.	
Anina Locality	Hettangian-Sinemurian	Romania	An important paleobotany site. The main groups present include: Hepaticae, Filicopsida, Sphenopsida, Lycopsida, Pteridospermopsida, Ginkgoopsida, Cycadopsida, Coniferopsida and some tetrapod ichnofossils.	
Connecticut River Valley trackways	Early Hettangian-Early Sinemurian	Connecticut, US	A trackway Lagerstätte that preserves abundant traces in exceptional detail, including imprints of scales and protofeathers.	Footprints of the ichnogenus Grallator from the site.
Osteno (Moltrasio Formation)	~196-188 Ma	Italy	Several kinds of marine biota, such as fish, crustaceans, cephalopods, polychaetes, and nematodes have been recovered. This site is the only fossil deposit in Italy in which soft tissues are preserved other than Monte Bolca.	Ecological reconstruction in the site, showing thylacocephalan Ostenocaris and cephalopod Ostenoteuthis
Charmouth Mudstone Formation	~196-188 Ma	Lyme Regis and Charmouth, UK	Known for its amniote remains, especially complete specimens of the armoured dinosaur Scelidosaurus, but also plesiosaurs & ichthyosaurs. Large quantities of exceptional fish specimens and a diverse entomofauna are also known.	Excepcionally preserved Scelidosaurus
Rotzo Formation	~192-184 Ma	Italy	Diverse fossils from a carbonate archipelago, especially within plicatostylid reefs. It is best known for the exceptional preservation of organisms such as testate amoebae, especially for its amber-bearing layers and associated macroflora.	An in-situ bed of Pachygervillia
Calcaires du Bou Dahar	196-183 Ma	Morocco	It records the evolution of a carbonate platform. It is known mostly for its rich coral bioherms and associated invertebrates.	
Sedan	185 Ma	Ardennes France	Notorious for extraordinarily good preservation of highly abundant echinoderm specimens.	
Korsaröd (Djupadal Formation)	183 Ma	Skane, Sweden	Known for its exceptionally preserved plant remains, specially Osmundastrum pulchellum, preserving intact calcified tissue with DNA and cells. It has also preserved its biotic interactions and even ongoing mitosis.	
Ya Ha Tinda	183 Ma	Alberta, Canada	A fossil site notable for containing abundant and extremely well-preserved vampire squid, being the largest concentration of vampire squid fossils outside the Tethys Ocean, and for being deposited during the Toarcian Oceanic Anoxic Event (TOAE).	
Strawberry Bank	183 Ma	Somerset, UK	A site from the TOAE documenting marine life during the recovery from the Triassic-Jurassic extinction event as well as the turmoil of the TOAE. The oldest pseudoplanktonic barnacles in the fossil record, near-complete ichthyosaur skeletons, and evidence of ichthyosaur niche partitioning are preserved at this site. Is a part of the Beacon Limestone Formation.	
Grimmen Formation	183 Ma	Grimmen, Germany	A coastal marine sequence, known especially for its fish fauna. The formation is also known for its rich entomofauna, including collections of up to 3000 specimens.	Reinberg Member biota
Holzmaden/Posidonia Shale	183 Ma	Württemberg, Germany	The Sachrang Member is among the most important formations of the Toarcian boundary, due to the concentrations of exceptionally well-preserved complete skeletons of fossil marine fish and reptiles. It was also deposited during the TOAE.	A specimen of the ichthyosaur Stenopterygius crassicostatus with preserved young
Carapace Formation/"Interbeds of the Kirkpatrick Basalt"	182-177 Ma	South Victoria Land, Antarctica	Know for the preservation of soft-bodied organisms from hydrothermally-influenced shallow freshwater lakes.	
Los Molles Formation	Late Pliensbachian- Early Toarcian	Neuquén Province, Argentina	A site currently known for its ichthyosaurs.	
Bascharage Lagerstätte	Early Toarcian (~183 Ma)	Southern Luxembourg	A near shore site from the Toarcian Oceanic Anoxic Event. Fossils of ichthyosaurs, pachycormids, and other fish, insects, and vampyromorphs have been found in the site.	
Czêstochowa fossil site	Uppermost Bajocian	Czêstochowa, Poland	A konzentrat site that preserves fossil invertebrates within concretions.	
Kubekovo Locality	Aalenian‒Bathonian	Krasnoyarsk Krai, Russia	A site known for its exceptional preservation of insects. is located within the larger Itat Formation.	
Djara Phyllocrinus Bed	Lower Bathonian	Moghrar, Algeria	A bed within the Djara Formation that preserves a large concentration of the crinoid Phyllocrinus stellaris.	
Bakhar Formation	Terminal Middle Jurassic to earliest Late Jurassic	Mongolia	Was most likely deposited in a lacustrine environment. Well-preserved invertebrates are known from this formation.	
Cabeço da Ladeira	Late Bajocian	Portugal	A site known for exquisite preservation of microbial mats in a tidal flat. Is a part of the Chão das Pias Formation	Example of the exceptional preservation of echinoderms
Monte Fallano Plattenkalk	? (Bajocian-Bathonian)	Campania, Italy	This Plattenkalk preserves fossils of terrestrial plants, crustaceans, and fish.	
Ukureyskaya Formation	Bajocian to Tithonian	Russia	Hundreds of specimens of ornithoschian Kulindadromeus are known from this site, which preserves integument.	Reconstruction of Kulindadromeus
Christian Malford	Callovian	Wiltshire, UK	A site in the Oxford Clay Formation which preserves exceptionally detailed coleoid fossils.	
Wallücke Lagerstätte	Callovian	Wiehen Hills, North Rhine-Westphalia, Germany	An echinoderm Lagerstätte deposited within a shallow basin. Three species of asteroids, as well as crinoids, ophiuroids, and sea urchins, have been recovered from the formation, either as pyritized, articulated body fossils, non-pyritized body fossils, or imprints of body fossils.	
Tendaguru Formation	Callovian-Hauterivian	Tanzania	A Konzentrat Lagerstätte known for its large bonebeds of dinosaur fossils.	
Mesa Chelonia	164.6 Ma	Shanshan County, China	This site is notable because it contains a large turtle bonebed, containing specimens of the genus Annemys. This bonebed contains up to an estimated 36 turtles per square meter.	
La Voulte-sur-Rhône	160 Mya	Ardèche, France	La Voulte-sur-Rhône, in the Ardèche region of southwestern France, offers paleontologists an outstanding view of an undisturbed paleoecosystem that was preserved in fine detail. Notable finds include retinal structures in the eyes of thylacocephalan arthropods and fossilized relatives of the modern-day vampire squid, such as Vampyronassa rhodanica.	A rare well-preserved cephalopod, Rhomboteuthis
Shar Teeg Beds	160-145 Mya	Govi-Altay, Mongolia	Many insect remains and some vertebrates, such as relatives of crocodilians, are known from this site.	
Karabastau Formation	155.7 Ma	Kazakhstan	This site is an important locality for insect fossils that has been studied since the early 20th century, alongside the rarer remains of vertebrates, including pterosaurs, salamanders, lizards, and crocodiles.	Sordes, small pterosaur with visible soft-tissues preserved
Haifanggou Formation	~165-159.8 Ma	Northeastern China	A site known for its fossil arthropods, amphibians, dinosaurs, pterosaurs, mammaliaforms, and plants. It forms a part of the Yanliao Biota.	Two specimens of Mongolarachne
Tiaojishan Formation	165-153 Ma	Liaoning Province, China	It is known for its exceptionally preserved fossils, including plants, insects, and vertebrates. It is made up mainly of pyroclastic rock interspersed with basic volcanic and sedimentary rocks, and forms a part of the Yanliao Biota.	Anchiornis, small feathered anchiornithid dinosaur
Nikitino Lagerstätte	Callovian-lower Oxfordian	Ryazan Oblast, Russia	A Lagerstätte that contains ammonites, bivalves, gastropods, decapods , and marine reptile remains.	
Cordebugle Lagerstätte	Oxfordian	Calvados, Normandy, France	Exceptionally well-preserved mollusc shells. UV light has revealed the oldest known colour patterns in molluscs.	Cloughtonia under UV light showing residual colour pattern
La Casita Formation	Kimmeridgian	Coahuila,Mexico	A marine Konzentrat Lagerstätte deposited in a hemipelagic mud bottom during dysoxic conditions.	
Paleontological site of Cerin	Late Kimmeridgian	Ain, Auvergne-Rhône-Alpes, France	A limestone that preserves algae, jellyfish, ammonites, crustaceans, bivalves, echinoderms, fish, reptiles, terrestrial flora, and aquatic fossil traces.	A cast of Crocodilaemus robustus, a crocodylomorph
Talbragar fossil site	151 Ma	New South Wales, Australia	This bed is part of the Purlawaugh Formation, and it provided fauna like fish and insects that lived around the lake.	Cavenderichthys, a teleost
Cleveland-Lloyd Dinosaur Quarry	150 Ma	Utah, US	Jurassic National Monument, at the site of the Cleveland-Lloyd Dinosaur Quarry, well known for containing the densest concentration of Jurassic dinosaur fossils ever found, is a paleontological site located near Cleveland, Utah, in the San Rafael Swell, a part of the geological layers known as the Morrison Formation. Up to 15,000 have been excavated from this site alone.	Allosaurus, the largest predator of the quarry
Douglass Quarry	150 Ma	Utah, US	A site from the Morrison Formation that contains a dense concentration of sauropods and other dinosaurs.	
Canjuers Lagerstätte	150 Ma	France	This site shows a high amount of biodiversity, including reptiles, invertebrates, fish, and other organisms.	Pleurosaurus, an aquatic rhynchocephalian
Zhenghe Fauna	150-148 Ma	Fujian Province, China	A site that was deposited within a swampy environment. It is mainly known for preserving the paravian Fujianvenator, but hundreds of other specimens with soft tissue are known.	
Agardhfjellet Formation	150-140 Ma	Spitsbergen, Norway	The formation contains the Slottsmøya Member, a highly fossiliferous unit where many ichthyosaur and plesiosaur fossils have been found, as well as abundant and well-preserved fossils of invertebrates.	Pliosaurus funkei, a large thalassophonean pliosaurid
Nusplingen Limestone	Late Kimmeridgian	Baden-Württemberg, Germany	A fossil site similar to the Solnhofen Archipelago. Older than sites in the archipelago like Altmühltal, Painten, and Mörnsheim. Contains a diverse assemblage of insects, crustaceans, and pterosaurs.	A juvenile specimen of Cycnorhamphus suevicus
Causse Méjean Limestone	Kimmeridgian-Tithonian	Lozère, Occitania, France	Most of the fossils were from two now mostly filled-in quarries. Fossils found here include brachiopods, echinoderms, mollusks, crustaceans, fish, and Kallimodon.	
Ettling Lagerstätte	Late Kimmeridgian-Tithonian	Bavaria, Germany	A site within the Solnhofen Archipelago. Preserves many of the same animals as the rest of the region, as well as Cerin. Fish, xiphosurans, beetles, crustaceans, and turtles have been recovered from the site. Which formation the site belongs to is currently unknown.	Pleuropholis sp., a fossil fish
Crayssac Lagerstätte	Lower Tithonian	Lot, Occitania, France	A tidal mudflat that preserves fossil trackways of crocodiles, dinosaurs, turtles, pterosaurs, and invertebrates, including those made by isopods.	
Solnhofen Archipelago Lagerstätten (including the Altmühltal, Painten, Torleite, and Mörnsheim Formations)	149-148 Ma	Bavaria, Germany	This site is unique as it preserves a rare assemblage of fossilized organisms, including highly detailed imprints of soft-bodied organisms such as sea jellies. The most familiar fossils of the Solnhofen Plattenkalk include the early feathered theropod dinosaur Archaeopteryx preserved in such detail that they are among the most famous fossils in the world.	The Berlin Specimen of Archaeopteryx lithographica
Owadów–Brzezinki site	~148 Ma	Łódź Voivodeship, Poland	A marine deposit of the Kcynia Formation similar to the Solnhofen Formation, with large numbers of preserved insect remains, numerous marine invertebrates, and vertebrates including fishes, marine reptiles, and pterosaurs.	Fossil of the horseshoe crab Crenatolimulus darwini
Chassiron	Tithonian-Earliest Cretaceous	Oléron, Nouvelle-Aquitaine, France	A Konzentrat-Lagerstätte that produces plant remains, shells, and numerous isolated vertebrate remains.	

=== Paleogene ===
Site(s)	Age	Location	Significance	Notable fossils/organisms
Kilwa Group	Paleocene-Oligocene	Tanzania	A microfossil Konservat-Lagerstätte that is mostly known for its well-preserved foraminiferans.	
Baunekule Facies	64-63 Ma (Danian)	eastern Denmark	These facies of the Faxe Formation document an extremely well-preserved cold-water coral mound ecosystem dominated by Dendrophyllia corals, and also includes gastropods, tubeworms, bivalves, bryozoans, and gastropods.	
U1511	Danian-Selandian	Tasman Sea	A site discovered by oceanic drill cores that uncovered a well-preserved fauna of foraminiferans that had undergone little diagenesis.	
Almont flora	Late Paleocene	Williston Basin, North Dakota, US	A diverse floral community containing macrofossil plants including fruits, seeds, leaves, catkins and other structures. Birches, walnuts, myrtles, and many other plant families have been recovered from the deposit. The Almont Flora was initially described as being deposited within a lake or pond, however more recent analysis indicates that it could have been deposited within an isolated oxbow lake in a larger river system. The site belongs to the larger Sentinel Butte Formation.	
Tenejapa-Lacandón Formation	~63 Ma	Chiapas, Mexico	A formation with a high number of well-preserved fish fossils is indicative of mass mortality events. One of the most important formations for documenting the recovery of ocean ecosystems in the wake of the K-Pg extinction, due to being deposited just a few million years after and being located only 500 kilometres (310 mi) away from the Chixculub impact site.	Eekaulostomus, Kelmejtubus, and Paleoserranus, three unique fish
Qreiya 3	62.2 Ma	Eastern Desert, Egypt	An early Paleocene site that captures over 500 articulated fish fossils from a wide variety of groups. The site was probably deposited in anoxic marine conditions following the Late Danian Event. Animals found include a snake, chondrichthyan teeth, pycnodonts, Osteoglossids, Veliferids, Syngnathids, Scombrids and several other groups.	
Konservat-Lagerstätte Menat	60 Ma	Auvergne, France	A Palaeocene maar lake containing three-dimensional plant remains. It is particularly notable for preserving one of the oldest known bees.	Palaeohabropoda, a fossil bee
Iceberg Bay Formation	Late Paleocene- Early Eocene	Nunavut, Canada	A high-latitude site that was deposited in a low-energy swamp. In-situ stumps and old-growth conifer forest leaf litter with preservation down to the molecular level.	
Appian Way locality	Eocene	Vancouver, British Columbia, Canada	A site that preserves extensive floral remains, as well as that of fungi.	
Tallahatta Formation	Eocene	Covington County, Alabama, US	A Lagerstätte interval that preserves wood borings within a accumulation of logs. This log-ground system was most likely deposited in a time of rising sea levels. The site has been compared to similar sites preserving wood borings in the Mooreville Chalk Lagerstätte.	
Danata Formation	56-53 Ma	western Turkmenistan	Outcropping in the Kopet Dag range, this formation preserves numerous fossil fish from a northeastern arm of the Tethys Ocean during the Paleocene-Eocene thermal maximum. 38 taxa from 13 orders are known, the vast majority of which are acanthomorphs.	Eospinus, a bizarre tetraodontiform fish
Fur Formation	55–53 Ma	Fur & Mors, Denmark	Preserves abundant fossil fish, insects, reptiles, birds, and plants. The Fur Formation was deposited about 55 Ma, just after the Palaeocene-Eocene boundary, and its tropical or subtropical flora indicates that the climate following the Paleocene-Eocene Thermal Maximum was moderately warm (approximately 4-8 degrees warmer than today).	Immature fossil of Tasbacka danica, a sea turtle
London Clay	54–48 Ma	England, UK	Collected for close to 300 years. Plant fossils, especially seeds and fruits, are found in abundance. Some 350 named species of plant have been found, making the London Clay flora one of the world's most diverse for fossil seeds and fruits. The flora includes tropical taxa found in modern Asia, reflecting the much warmer climate of the early Eocene. Also considered a potential "Liberation Lagerstätte".^{see notes}	Brychaetus muelleri, fish skull
Oise amber	~53 MA	Oise, northern France	An important amber deposit that preserves a diverse insect fauna.	The Elektroepyris magnificus holotype
Eocene Okanagan Highlands	52 - 48 Ma	British Columbia, Canada & Washington, Canada and US	Includes McAbee Fossil Beds, Princeton chert & Klondike Mountain Formation; Recognized as temperate/subtropical uplands right after the Paleocene–Eocene Thermal Maximum and spanning the Early Eocene Climatic Optimum, preserves highly detailed uplands lacustrine fauna and flora.	A Florissantia quilchenensis flower, an extinct malvaceaen genus from western North America
Cambay amber	52 - 50 Ma	Gujarat, India	A significant amber Lagerstätte that preserves arthropods, mainly insects.	Nanotermes issacae, a termite
Monte Solane	51-49 MA	Verona, Italy	Slightly older than the nearby, more well-known Monte Bolca site, the Monte Solane site also preserves numerous marine fish and plants, but documents an entirely different ecosystem that appears to be of a bathypelagic habitat, forming one of the few known Lagerstätte to preserve a deep-sea ecosystem.	Exeomastix zabimaru, an early cutlassfish
Green River Formation	50 Ma	Colorado/Utah/Wyoming, US	An Eocene-aged site noted for its preserved fish fauna. Other fossils include the crocodilians, birds, and mammals.	Diplomystus and Knightia
Solteri Lagerstätte	Ypresian	Trento, Italy	A fossil site that is one of the oldest Cenozoic deep-sea faunas in the world, with this largely being made up of fish and crustaceans. Estimates of the fauna's depth place it between 250–400 metres (820–1,310 ft), placing it within the upper mesopelagic zone. The assemblage has been suggested to largely be coeval with the more famous Monte Bolca.	
Monte Bolca	50-49 Ma	Verona, Italy	A fossil site with specimens of fish and other organisms that are so well-preserved that their organs are often completely intact in fossil form, and even the skin color can sometimes be determined. It is assumed that the mud at the site was low in oxygen, preventing both decay and scavenger mixing from harming the fossils. There are several Lagerstätten layers under this site, including the marine sites of Pesciara, Monte Postale, and the brackish/freshwater sites at Purga di Bolca and Vegroni.	A complete Archaeophis proavus
Messel Formation	47 Ma	Hessen, Germany	This site has significant geological and scientific importance. Over 1000 species of plants and animals have been found at the site. After nearly becoming a landfill, the Messel Pit was saved by strong local resistance and was declared a UNESCO World Heritage Site on 9 December 1995. Significant scientific discoveries about the early evolution of mammals and birds are still being made at the Messel Pit, and the site has increasingly become a tourist site as well.	Masillamys sp., an ischyromyid rodent
Geiseltal	48.5–41 Ma	Saxony-Anhalt, Germany	A site that has produced over 50,000 fossil vertebrates, as well as a diverse array of insects and plants within a lacustrine ecosystem.	
Buchanan Lake Formation	~47.5-41.3 Ma	Nunavut, Canada	A high-latitude fluvial deposit that preserves in-situ old-growth conifer forests with leaf litter preservation down to the molecular level.	
Baltic amber	47-35 Ma (Lutetian to Priabonian)	Pomeranian Voivodeship, Poland & Kaliningrad Oblast, Russia	The largest amber deposit on Earth, this amber is part of the Prussian Formation. It preserves a high diversity of exceptionally well-preserved fossil invertebrates, plants, and small vertebrates that inhabited eastern Europe during the warmer, subtropical conditions of the middle Eocene. It is the world's largest repository of fossil insects.	Yantarogekko, a gecko
Kishenehn Formation	46.2 Ma	Montana, US	A Middle Eocene site preserving exquisitely detailed insect specimens in oil shale. Hemoglobin-derived proteins have been found associated with a blood-engorged mosquito.	
Mahenge Formation	46 Ma	Tanzania	A terrestrial Middle Eocene maar Lagerstätte preserving fish, plant, and arthropod fossils.	The frog Singidella
Eckfeld Maar	45-44 Ma	Rhineland-Palatinate, Germany	A maar Lagerstätte that preserves extensive flora and insects. Horses have also been recovered within the site.	
Quercy Phosphorites Formation	45-25 Ma	Occitania, France	This site qualifies as a Lagerstätte because, besides a large variety of mammals, birds, turtles, crocodiles, flora, and insects, it also preserves the soft tissues of amphibians and squamates and their articulated skeletons in what have been called natural mummies.	Xenomorphia resurrecta parasitic wasps preserved in fly pupae
Na Duong	Priabonian	Vietnam	A Late Eocene site notable for its highly detailed coprolite preservation.	
Piedra Chamana Fossil Forest	39 Ma	Cajamarca, Peru	An in-situ forest found within volcaniclastic sediments that preserves trees within the genus Qualeoxylon. The site was deposited within the Huambos Formation.	
Bitterfeld amber	38-34 Ma	Saxony, Germany	One of three major Paleogene deposits of European amber, this deposit of the Cottbus Formation shares a similar biota to the Baltic Amber, indicating a concurrent formation, but appears to have a geologically distinct origin from Baltic amber.	Pseudoscorpions from the Bitterfeld amber
Rovno amber	38-34 Ma	Rivne Oblast, Ukraine & Gomel, Belarus	One of three major Paleogene deposits of European amber, this deposit of the Obukhov Formation preserves a high diversity of invertebrates, many of which are shared with the Baltic amber, but others of which are unique. A drier habitat compared to the Baltic amber is suggested based on some of the insect taxa preserved.	Eocenomyrma ukrainica, an ant
Florissant Formation	34 Ma	Colorado, US	A late Eocene (Priabonian)-aged site noted for its finely preserved plant and insect paleobiota. Fossils are preserved in diatom blooms of a lahar-dammed lake system, and the formation is noted for the petrified stumps of Sequoia affinis.	A Palaeovespa florissantia
Bembridge Marls	34 Ma	Isle of Wight, UK	A limestone that fossilizes insects, including thrips, hemipterans. These animals were most likely deposited in a lagoonal environment, with possible influence from rivers.	
Keasey Formation	33.5-33 Ma	Oregon, US	A near-shore shelf slope with volcanic influences. The site preserves articulated crinoid specimens in exceptional detail.	
Babaheidar (Pabdeh Formation)	late Eocene/early Oligocene	Chaharmahal and Bakhtiari province, Iran	A well-preserved marine fossil site in the Zagros Mountains with thousands of known fish fossils, as well as plants, crustaceans, insects, and birds.	Iraniplectus, an unusual tetraodontiform
Tremembé Formation	30-25 Ma	São Paulo, Brazil	A Late Oligocene-aged freshwater lake deposit, containing well-preserved fossil fishes.	Fossil specimens of the characin Lignobrycon ligniticus
Menilite Formation	Early Oligocene	Poland	A deep-sea flysch deposit along the Carpathian Mountains, originally deposited in the Paratethys Sea with exceptionally preserved deepwater fish fossils and microbial mats.	Fossil of the fish Oligoserranoides
Canyon Ferry Reservoir	32.0 ± 0.1 Ma	Montana, US	A diverse Early Oligocene plant and insect fossil site.	
Sables à galets d'Étréchy	Rupelian	Essonne, France	A Konzentrat-Lagerstätte that preserves numerous fishes, reptiles, one bird, and nearly complete sirenians.	
Luberon (Campagne-Calavon Formation)	~30 Ma	Cereste, France	A group of early Oligocene localities deposited along a large freshwater lake, preserving the fossils of plants, insects, fish, and terrestrial vertebrates, often with articulated skeletons, skin outlines, feathers, and original pigmentation patterns.	Dapalis macrurus, one of the most common fossils of the site
Rauenberg Lagerstätte	30 Ma	Baden-Württemberg, Germany	A marine fossil site with an Arctic-like invertebrate fauna and a Paratethyan vertebrate fauna displaying evidence of intermittent anoxia.	
Bechlejovice Lagerstätte	27 Ma	Upper Bohemia, Czech Republic	A volcanically influenced lacustrine deposit with a diverse record of plants and invertebrates.	
Sieblos Lagerstätte	Rupelian	Hesse, Germany	A site that has produced fossil fish, frogs, crocodiles, snakes, birds, bats, gastropods, and rare dinoflagilate fosssils.	
Sangtang Lagerstätte	~28 – 23 Ma	Guangxi, China	A section of the Late Oligocene Yongning Formation with one of the very few known Cenozoic assemblages of mummified plant fossils, including mummified fruits.	
Enspel Lagerstätte	24.79-24.56 Ma	Rhineland-Palatinate, Germany	A Chattian maar deposit famous for its insect fossils.	
Aix-en-Provence Formation	~24 Ma	Provence, France	A terminal Oligocene brackish palaeoenvironment. Fossils of fish, insects, plants, crustaceans, jellyfish, and amphibians have been recovered from the formation.	
Rott Lagerstätte	Chattian	North Rhine-Westphalia, Germany	A species-rich maar site known for its preservation of insects, fish, and plants.	
Santang Lagerstätte	Late Oligocene	Guangxi, China	A site that preserves mummified plant remains.	

=== Neogene ===
Site(s)	Age	Location	Significance	Notable fossils/organisms
Bílina Mine	Early Miocene	Most Basin, Czech Republic	A site that preserves both plants from many species, including Liquidamber, Alnus, Decodon, Salix, and Quercus. Many of the leaves found show evidence of leaf mining or marginal feeding traces. Insect remains have also been discovered.	
Dominican amber	30–10 Ma	Dominican Republic	Dominican amber differentiates itself from Baltic amber by being nearly always transparent, and it has a higher number of fossil inclusions. This has enabled the detailed reconstruction of the ecosystem of a long-vanished tropical forest.	A larval Amblyomma tick preserved in amber
Riversleigh	25–15 Ma	Queensland, Australia	This locality is recognised for the series of well-preserved fossils deposited from the Late Oligocene to the Miocene. The fossiliferous limestone system is located near the Gregory River in the north-west of Queensland, an environment that was once a very wet rainforest and became more arid as the Gondwanan landmasses separated and the Australian continent moved north.	Reconstruction of the diprotodont marsupial Nimbadon lavarackorum
Foulden Maar	23 Ma	Otago, New Zealand	These layers of diatomite have preserved exceptional fossils of fish from the crater lake, and plants, spiders, and insects from the sub-tropical forest that developed around the crater, along with in situ pollen.	The teleost fish species Galaxias effusus
Ebelsberg Formation	23-22 Ma	Upper Austria, Austria	This Aquitanian-aged Konservat-Lagerstätte records an exceptional fossil assemblage of an enormous number of plants, fish, marine mammals, and marine invertebrates from a section of the central Paratethys Sea.	Austromola, a sunfish
Chiapas amber	23-15 Ma	Chiapas, Mexico	As with other ambers, a wide variety of taxa have been found as inclusions, including insects and other arthropods, as well as plant fragments and epiphyllous fungi.	The holotype specimen of the millipede Anbarrhacus adamantis
Agate Fossil Beds National Monument	21-16 Ma	Nebraska, US	Watering hole deposits with mass death assemblages of small rhinos alongside mammals such as amphicyonids (bear dogs), entelodonts, camelids, and chalicotheres.	
Clarkia fossil beds	20-17 Ma	Idaho, US	The Clarkia fossil beds site is best known for its fossil leaves. Their preservation is exquisite; fresh leaves are unfossilized, and sometimes retain their fall colors before rapidly oxidizing in the air. It has been reported that scientists have isolated small amounts of ancient DNA from fossil leaves at this site. However, other scientists are skeptical of the validity of this reported occurrence of Miocene DNA.	A leaf fossil from the beds after being exposed to oxygen
Rubielos de Mora Basin	20-16 Ma	Province of Teruel, Spain	A lacustrine mudstone deposit known for its preservation of insects, including those with patterning still present. Amphibians with preserved soft tissues, such as gills, have also been recovered.	
Foieta la Sarra-A	16.49–15.94 Ma	Castelló Province, Spain	A laminated lacustrine limestone that preserves remains of plants, insects, crustaceans, fish and mollusks that would have inhabited a riparian setting within the shallow lake.	
Barstow Formation	19–13.4 Ma	California, US	The sediments are fluvial and lacustrine in origin except for nine layers of rhyolitic tuff. It is well known for its abundant vertebrate fossils, including bones, teeth, and footprints. The formation is also renowned for the fossiliferous concretions in its upper member, which contain three-dimensionally preserved arthropods.	A fossilized footprint made by a camel
Shanwang Formation	18-17 Ma	Shandong Province, China	Fossils have been found at this site in dozens of categories, representing over 600 separate species. Animal fossils include insects, fish, spiders, amphibians, reptiles, birds, and mammals. Insect fossils have clear, intact veins. Some have retained beautiful colours.	Fossil of Lusorex
Morozaki Group	18-17 Ma	Aichi Prefecture, Japan	Known from well-preserved deep sea fauna including fish, starfish and arthropods like crabs, shrimps and giant amphipods.	
Randeck Maar	17-15 Ma	Baden-Württemberg, Germany	A maar Lagerstätte from the Middle Miocene Climatic Optimum. At the time, it would have been a lake only slightly above sea level. Plants, insects, ostracods, arachnids, fish, amphibians, and other vertebrate remains have been recovered.	
Sandelzhausen Lagerstätte	16 Ma	Bavaria, Germany	A Middle Miocene vertebrate locality.	
McGraths Flat	~16-11 Ma	NSW, Australia	Deposited in unusual conditions that record microscopic details of soft tissues and delicate structures. Fossil evidence of animals with soft bodies, unlike the bones of mammals and reptiles, is rare in Australia, and discoveries at McGraths' Flat have revealed unknown species of invertebrates such as insects and spiders.	The large spider Megamonodontium
Ballast Brook Formation	Middle Miocene	Banks Island, Northwest Territories, Canada	A high-latitude lacustrine deposit that preserves conifer forest leaf litter down to the molecular level. It has been compared to the deposits at Clarkia, Iceberg Bay, and Buchanan Lake Formations.	
Pisco Formation	15-2 Ma	Arequipa & Ica, Peru	Several specialists consider the Pisco Formation one of the most important Lagerstätten, based on the large number of exceptionally preserved marine fossils, including sharks (most notably megalodon), penguins, whales, dolphins, birds, marine crocodiles, and aquatic giant sloths.	Reconstruction of the macroraptorial stem-physeteroid whale Acrophyseter
Hindon Maar	14.6 Ma	New Zealand	A maar preserving a Southern Hemisphere lake-forest ecosystem, including body fossils of plants, insects, fish, and birds, along with in situ pollen and coprolites of both fish and birds.	
Paleolake Boreas	14 Ma	Antarctica	An ancient high latitude lake that preserves ostracods, including their soft tissue anatomy. During deposition, the region probably experienced tundra conditions.	
La Venta (a part of the Honda Group)	13.8–11.8 Ma	Colombia	A Konzentrat-Lagerstätte known for its diverse assemblage of neotropical fauna from the middle Miocene, including glyptodonts, notoungulates, and ground sloths.	
Ngorora Formation	13.3-9 Ma	Tanzania	The alkaline palaeolake deposits of the Ngorora Formation contain articulated fish fossils that died en masse from asphyxiation during episodic ash falls or from rapid acidification.	Megistotherium, a large hyaenodont mammal
Dolnja Stara vas Lagerstätte	13.5 Ma	Slovenia	A shallow water lagoon site with a nearby mangrove forest. Preserves highly detailed barnacles and plant associations.	
Öhningen Maar	13 Ma	Baden-Württemberg, Germany	This unit of the Upper Freshwater-Molasse contains a former crater lake that has produced long-renowned fossils for centuries, including several foundational to the science of paleontology. About 1,500 species have been described from these deposits.	The giant salamander Andrias scheuchzeri
Pi Gros	13 Ma	Catalonia, Spain	An ichnofossil Lagerstätte containing annelid, mollusc, and sponge trace fossils. The fossil site no longer exists because it was quarried for the construction of an industrial park.	
Ville di Montecoronaro (Verghereto marls)	Serravallian-Tortonian	Emilia-Romagna, Italy	An ichnofossil Lagerstätte that contains 43 ichnotaxa.	
Bullock Creek	12 Ma	Northern Territory, Australia	Among the fossils at the Bullock Creek site have been found complete marsupial crania with delicate structures intact. New significant taxa identified from the Bullock Creek mid Miocene include the crocodile genus Baru, a primitive true kangaroo (Nambaroo), with high-crowned lophodont teeth; and a species of giant horned tortoise, Meiolania. Marsupial lion, thylacine, and dasyurid material has also been recovered.	
Tunjice	? (Middle Miocene)	Slovenia	This site is known worldwide for the earliest fossil records of seahorses.	Two fossil seahorse species, Hippocampus sarmaticus and H. slovenicus from this site
Ashfall Fossil Beds	11.83 Ma	Nebraska, US	The Ashfall Fossil Beds of Antelope County in northeastern Nebraska are rare fossil sites that, due to extraordinary local conditions, capture an ecological "snapshot" in time of a range of well-preserved fossilized organisms. An eruption from the Yellowstone hotspot 10-12 million years ago created these fossilized bone beds.	A bone-bed containing the fossils of the basal rhino Teleoceras and the three-toed horse Cormohipparion
Höwenegg	~10 Ma	Baden-Württemberg, Germany	A Miocene maar site that has produced fossil fish, turtles, and mammals.	A fossil of Hipparion primigenius
Mikrotia fauna	9.0-5.5 Ma	Gargano, Italy	A site where Miocene mammals and birds fell through fissures in Jurassic rocks, leading to massive collections of well-preserved animals.	
Dorn-Dürkheim Lagerstätte	9.0 Ma - 800 Ka	Rhineland-Palatinate, Germany	It is divided into three distinct sites, labeled 1-3. The first site was deposited during the Turolian, and over 5,000 large-mammal fossils have been identified, alongside numerous microremains. The second site was dated to the Middle Pleistocene age and contains mammal fossils. The final site was dated to the Late Early Pleistocene and contained mammal fossils, ostracods, and manufactured stone tools.	
Tresjuncos Lagerstätte	9.0-5.3 Ma	Castilla–La Mancha, Spain	A Late Miocene lacustrine Konservat-Lagerstätte containing fossils of diatoms, plants, crustaceans, insects, and amphibians.	
Alcoota Fossil Beds	8 Ma	Northern Territory, Australia	It is notable for the occurrence of well-preserved, rare, Miocene vertebrate fossils, which provide evidence of the evolution of the Northern Territory's fauna and climate. The Alcoota Fossil Beds are also significant as a research and teaching site for palaeontology students.	Miscellaneous fossils of several macropod marsupials
Saint-Bauzile Lagerstätte	7.6-7.2 Ma	Ardèche, France	A Late Miocene site preserving articulated mammal skeletons with skin and fur impressions.	
Capo San Marco Formation	~7 Ma	Sardinia, Italy	A microbialite containing exceptionally preserved Girvanella-type filaments.	
Libros	Late Miocene	Teruel, Spain	A Late Miocene lacustrine Lagerstätte located inside a sulfur mine, including well-preserved remains of frogs, as well as beavers, birds, snakes, insects, arachnids, and plant remains.	Fossil specimen of the frog Pelophylax pueyoi
Balatino 3B	Messinian	Piedmont, Italy	Numerous insects, including dragonfly nymphs preserved in 3d trapped inside transparent gypsum crystals.	
Sainte-Reine lagerstätte	Messinian	Murat, Auvergne-Rhône-Alpes, France	A maar site that has produced mainly fossil insects including bees and lacewings.	
Almanzora Member	Mid-UppperPliocene	Almería, Spain	A site that showcases the biota that recolonized the Mediterranean Sea after the Messinian Salinity Crisis. Fish remains, flowers, ctenophores, and coprolites have been recovered from the site.	
Gray Fossil Site	4.9-4.5 Ma	Tennessee, US	As the first site of its age known from the Appalachian region, the Gray Fossil Site is a unique window into the past. Research at the site has yielded many surprising discoveries, including new species of red panda, rhinoceros, pond turtle, hickory tree, and more. The site also hosts the world's largest known assemblage of fossil tapirs.	Fossil skull of Pristinailurus, a North American relative of the modern red panda
Hagerman Fossil Beds National Monument	4-3 Ma	Idaho, US	A fossil-rich Pliocene site with over 140 species, including abundant fossils of the Hagerman horse (Equus simplicidens).	
Camp dels Ninots lagerstätte	3.3-3.1 Ma	Caldes de Malavella, Spain	A maar site that preserves large mammalian megafauna, as well as turtles, amphibians, and plants.	An excavation at the site
Haguenau terrace	3,6 - 2,6 Ma	Alsace, France	This Lagerstätte is composed of a few sites that preserve a diverse flora, molluscs and some vertebrate remains.	
Willershausen Lagerstätte	3 Ma	Lower Saxony, Germany	A lacustrine fossil site containing well-preserved beetles.	

=== Quaternary ===
Site(s)	Age	Location	Significance	Notable fossils/organisms
Shiobara Group	774-129 Ka (Chibanian)	Tochigi Prefecture, Japan	A lacustrine environment that preserves fossilized leaves, flowers, insects, arachnids, mammals, amphibians, and diatoms.	
The Mammoth Site	26 Ka	South Dakota, US	The facility encloses a prehistoric sinkhole that formed and was slowly filled with sediments during the Pleistocene era. As of 2016, the remains of 61 mammoths, including 58 North American Columbian and 3 woolly mammoths, had been recovered. Mammoth bones were found at the site in 1974, and a museum and building enclosing the site were established.	Fossil skeleton of Arctodus simus, a large species of "short-faced" bear that was one of North America's largest predators during the Pleistocene
Red Hills Road Cave	~40-20 Ka	St. Andrew Parish, Jamaica	A cave fissure deposit that trapped and preserved remains of arthropods, including millipedes, isopods, terrestrial crabs, and insect remains.	
Rancho La Brea Tar Pits	40–12 Ka	California, US	A group of tar pits where natural asphalt (also called asphaltum, bitumen, or pitch; brea in Spanish) has seeped up from the ground for tens of thousands of years. Over many centuries, the bones of trapped animals have been preserved. Among the prehistoric species associated with the La Brea Tar Pits are Pleistocene mammoths, dire wolves, short-faced bears, American lions, ground sloths, and, the state fossil of California, the saber-toothed cat (Smilodon fatalis).	Fossil skeleton of Mammuthus columbi excavated from the tar pits
Waco Mammoth National Monument	65–51 Ka	Texas, US	A paleontological site and museum in Waco, Texas, United States where fossils of 24 Columbian mammoths (Mammuthus columbi) and other mammals from the Pleistocene Epoch have been uncovered. The site is the largest known concentration of mammoths dying from a (possibly) recurring event, which is believed to have been a flash flood.	Fossil skeleton of a mammoth found at the Waco site
El Breal de Orocual	2.5–1 Ma	Monagas, Venezuela	The largest asphalt well on the planet. Like the La Brea Tar Pits, this site preserves some megafauna like toxodonts, glyptodonts, camelids, and the felid Homotherium venezuelensis.	Restoration of the environment at El Breal de Orocual, showing Glyptodon, Coragyps, Dasypus and Myrmecophaga
El Mene de Inciarte	28–25.5 Ka	Zulia, Venezuela	Another series of tar pits. These also preserve a similar assemblage of megafauna.	
Mallorca Aeolianites	Late Pleistocene	Mallorca, Baleares, Spain	Sand dunes that preserve fossilized trackways of the genus Myotragus.	
Mare aux Songes	4 Ka	Mauritius	A marsh that preserves a diversity of subfossil animals and plants, many of which were driven to extinction without proper documentation following human arrival, most notably the famous dodo. The mortality assemblages may have formed from a freshwater lake that was occasionally impacted by catastrophic droughts.	Dodo skeleton from Mare aux Songes
Carreira Brava section	2975 Ya	Southwest Portugal	A site that preserves bee nests in exceptional detail, including brood, emerging adults, and tunnels from the genus Eucera. Land snails still retaining their in-life color have also been reported.	
Crawford Lake	800 Ya-present	Ontario, Canada	This lake is notable for its detailed preservation of rotifer and dinoflagellate fossils even after centuries, documenting the ecological shifts that occurred in and around the lake following the establishment of an Iroquoian village from 1268 to 1486 CE, and later following European colonization of the region in the early 19th century.	
