= Cornularia =

Cornularia may refer to:

- Cornularia (coral), a genus of soft corals in the family Cornulariidae
- Cornularia (fungus), a genus of fungi in the family Dermateaceae
