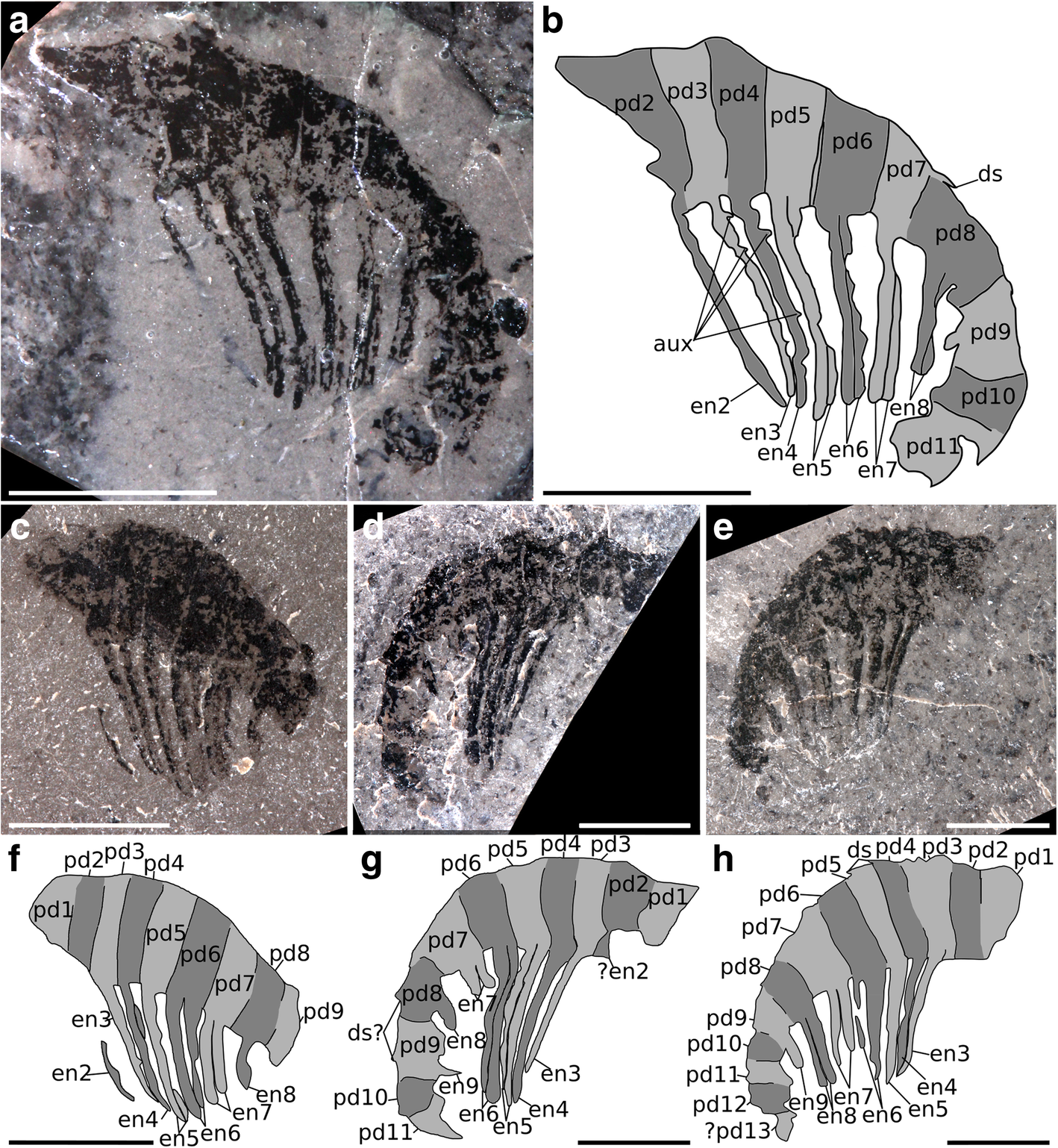
- Appendages from the Mount Cap Formation

Scientific classification
- Domain: Eukaryota
- Kingdom: Animalia
- Phylum: Arthropoda
- Order: †Radiodonta
- Family: †Hurdiidae
- Genus: †Ursulinacaris
- Species: †U. grallae

Binomial name
- †Ursulinacaris grallae Pates et al. 2019

= Ursulinacaris =

Ursulinacaris Temporal range: Wuliuan

Extinct genus of hurdiid radiodonts

Ursulinacaris is a genus of hurdiid radiodont from the Cambrian of North America. It contains one known species, Ursulinacaris grallae. It was described in 2019, based on fossils of the frontal appendages discovered in the 1990s and thereafter. The endites of Ursulinacaris were very slender, unlike other hurdiids such as Peytoia or Hurdia. It was initially reported as the first hurdiid with paired endites (a feature only present in other non-hurdiid radiodonts), but Moysiuk & Caron (2021) suggested that it is actually the preservation of the fossils and therefore there are no paired endites.

== Discovery and naming ==
Ursulinacaris fossils have been found in the Northwest Territories and Nevada. Most specimens come from the Little Bear biota of the Mount Cap Formation, though one referred specimen is from the Jangle Limestone member of the Carrara Formation of Nevada. Its generic name refers to the Little Bear biota, being derived from Latin "ursulina" meaning "from little bear" and "caris" meaning "crab". The name of the type species, U. grallae, is derived from the Latin word "grallae," which means "stilts," as a reference to the shape of the spines.

== Gallery ==
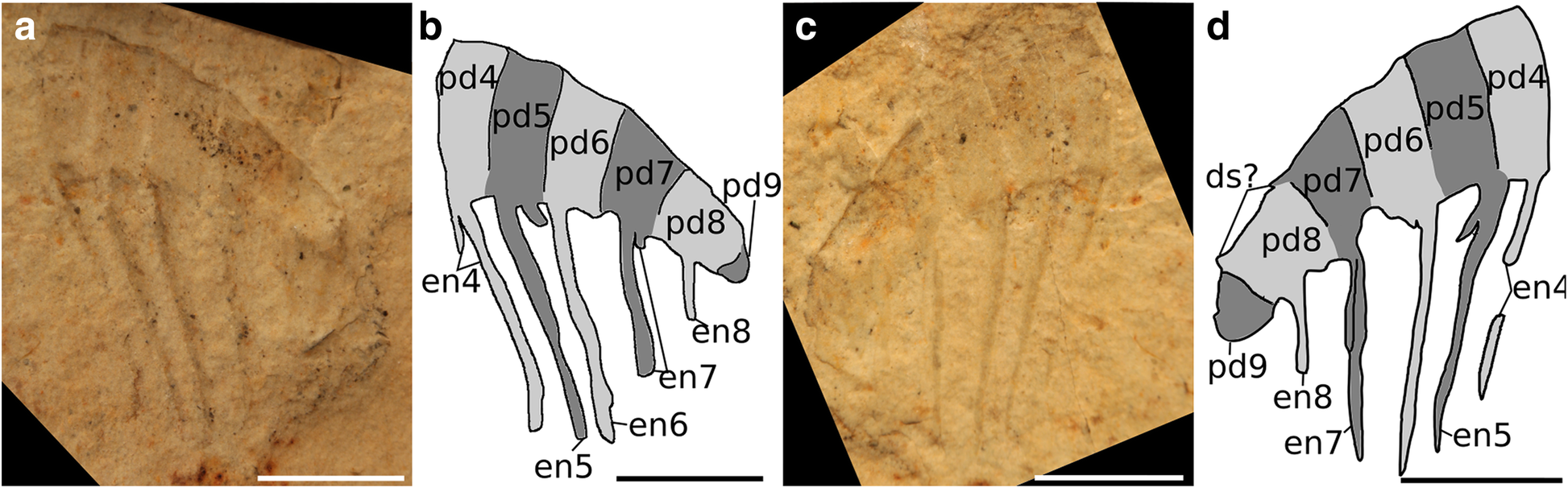
Referred specimen from the Carrara Formation

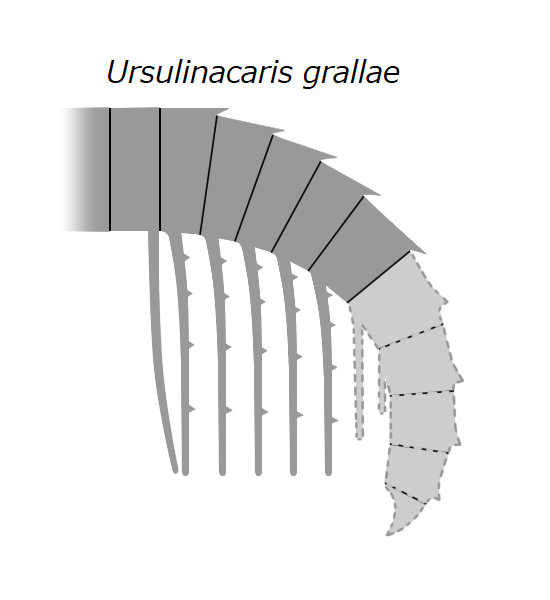
Reconstruction of frontal appendage
