= Qingshania =

Qingshania Temporal range: 1640–1590 Ma

Scientific classification
- Domain: Eukaryota
- (unranked): incertae sedis
- Genus: †Qingshania; Yan, 1989

Type species
- Qingshania magnifica Yan, 1989

Species
- Q. magnifica Yan, 1989; Q. kuanchengensis Liu et al, 2015

Genus of enigmatic eukaryote

Qingshania is a genus of enigmatic eukaryote from the Chuanlinggou Formation and Gaoyuzhuang Formation of China. It contains two species, Qingshania magnifica and Qingshania kuanchengensis.

== Description ==
Both species have cells up to around 200 micrometers across, although Q. kuanchengensis is the only one known from complete filaments. These filaments are roughly 8 mm long, with much smaller, blunted or conical terminal cells on each end. The filaments are uniform in width or taper towards one end, with mainly cylindrical cells. These cells often lack constrictions at their interfaces in Q. magnifica, and this is likely the case for Q. kuanchengensis as well. Unusually, Qingshania cells sometimes contain intracellular inclusions (or ICIs), which are likely spores due to their large size and well-defined nature. This genus seems to be within a clade of various other filamentous taxa, more specifically sharing the most similarities with the late Stenian Eosolena and Segmentothallus from the Lakhanda Group. However, these latter genera are several times larger than Qingshania with filaments up to 800 micrometers across, alongside seemingly lacking ICIs. Very similar filaments to Qingshania are known from the Ruyang Group, and they may even be the same genus due to similar age, however these are undescribed.
