= Cornularia elegans =

Scientific classification
- Kingdom: Fungi
- Division: Ascomycota
- Class: Leotiomycetes
- Order: Helotiales
- Family: Dermateaceae
- Genus: Cornularia
- Species: C. elegans

Binomial name
- Cornularia elegans Curzi, 1927

Species of fungus

Cornularia elegans is a species of fungus in the family Dermateaceae. It is found in Italy.
