= Klinta Formation =

Silurian fossil formation, Sweden

- Stratigraphic range: Ludfordian; ~425–423 Ma
- Bjärsjölagård Quarry, outcrop
- Type: Geological formation
- Unit of: Öved-Ramsåsa Group
- Sub-units: Bjärsjölagård, Bjärsjö, Bjär & Lunnarna members
- Underlies: Öved Sandstone formation
- Overlies: Colonus Shale
- Thickness: 100 m

Lithology
- Primary: Mudstone
- Other: Limestone Siltstone

Location
- Coordinates: 55.43°N 13.42°E
- Region: Skåne
- Country: Sweden

The Klinta formation is a late Silurian geological formation in Skåne, Sweden. The formation is dominated by calcareous mudstone and is inter-layered with subordinate siltstone, shallow-marine limestone and argillaceous limestone. The formation represents a shallowing of epicontinental seas on the paleocontinent Baltica, following a global sea-level highstand represented by the underlying 600 meter thick Colonus shale formation.

The calcareous mudstone succession of the Klinta formation is interrupted by the fossiliferous Bjärsjölagård limestone member, which reflects a rapid shallowing of depositional environments resulting from glaciation on the southern paleocontinent Gondwana. The sub-unit is well exposed at the abandoned Bjärsjölagård quarry and yields an abundance of fossil reef organisms, particularly Brachiopods, as well as a mass occurrence of oncoids (fossil cyanobacteria). Conodont biostratigraphy and carbon isotope geochemistry has proved that the global Lau mass-extinction event is recorded in the Bjärsjölagård member, and the unusually high record of microbes implies an ecologically stressed environment.

Drillcores from the Klinta formation has yielded a rich diversity of washed out cryptospores from 19 different genera of early land plants, implying that the adjacent terrestrial habitat on Baltica remained relatively stable while marine ecosystems fluctuated. Above the oncoid strata, the formation finally transitions into a calm lagoonal setting with freshwater input.

== Fossils content ==
=== Prokaryota ===
Group	Genus	Species	Location	Notes	Ref	Images
Bacteria	Girvanella		Bjärsjölagård quarry	Oncoids		Oncolites from the upper Burgsvik beds (Silurian, Gotland).

=== Animalia ===
Group	Genus	Species	Location	Notes	Ref	Images
Annelid	Kettnerites	K. sp	Bjärsjölagård quarry	Scolecodonts from aulinitid worm		Eunice, extant Paulintid worm
Bryozoa	Ptilodyctia	P. lanceolata	Bjärsjölagård quarry			Extant bryzoan
Bryozoa	Streblotrypa	S. baltica	Bjärsjölagård quarry			Extant bryzoan
Bryozoa	Saffordotaxis	S. ludlovensis	Bjärsjölagård quarry			Extant bryzoan
Bryozoa	Fistulipora	F. parva	Bjärsjölagård quarry			Extant bryzoan
Bryozoa	Ceramopora	C. perforata	Bjärsjölagård quarry			Extant bryzoan
Bryozoa	Eridotrypa	E. crassa	Bjärsjölagård quarry			Extant bryzoan
Bryozoa	Barostoma	B. scanicum	Bjärsjölagård quarry			Extant bryzoan
Bryozoa	Aasperopora	A. ludlovensis	Bjärsjölagård quarry			Extant bryzoan
Bryozoa	Aasperopora	A. explanatutn	Bjärsjölagård quarry			Extant bryzoan
Bryozoa	Pseudoleptotrypa	P. podolica	Bjärsjölagård quarry			Extant bryzoan
Cephalopoda	Orthoceratites	O. tenuis	Klinta fm.			Orthoceras
Bivalvia	Avicula	A. sp	Klinta fm. unspecified	Similar to Avicula retroflexa		
Bivalvia	Aviculopecten	A. reticidatus	Klinta fm. unspecified			A. subcardiformis (Carboniferous)
Bivalvia	Aviculopecten	A. Danbyi	Klinta fm. unspecified			A. subcardiformis (Carboniferous)
Bivalvia	Cardiola		Bjärsjölagård quarry	Rare		
Bivalvia	Cardium	C. sp	Klinta fm. unspecified			
Bivalvia	Nucula	N. antiqua	Klinta fm. unspecified			Shell of Nucula delphinodonta
Bivalvia	Nucula	N. costata	Klinta fm. unspecified			Shell of Nucula delphinodonta
Bivalvia	Pteronitella	P. retroflexa	Bjärsjölagård	1 - 5 cm		
Gastropoda	Platyceras	P. cornutum	Bjärsjölagård quarry			Extant sea snail
Brachiopoda	Atrypa	A. reticularis	Bjärsjölagård quarry	Most frequently occurring brachiopods		Atrypa reticularis
Brachiopoda	Craniops		Bjärsjölagård quarry	Rare		
Brachiopoda	Eospirifer	E. schmidti?	Bjärsjölagård quarry	brachiopod		
Brachiopoda	Howellella		Bjärsjölagård quarry	Most frequently occurring brachiopods		
Brachiopoda	Orthis	O. peeten	Klinta fm., unspecified	Description by Wilhelm Hisinger, 1840		
Brachiopoda	Orthis	O. striatella	Klinta fm., unspecified	Description by Wilhelm Hisinger, 1840		
Tabulata corals	Heliolites	H. interstinctus	Bjärsjölagård quarry			Halysites sp. from the Silurian of Ohio
Tabulata corals	Halysites		Bjärsjölagård quarry			Halysites sp. from the Silurian of Ohio
Tabulata corals	Favosites	F. Forbesi	Bjärsjölagård quarry			Halysites sp. from the Silurian of Ohio
Tabulata corals	Syringopora		Bjärsjölagård quarry			Halysites sp. from the Silurian of Ohio
Tabulata corals	Coenites	C. intertextus	Bjärsjölagård quarry			Halysites sp. from the Silurian of Ohio
Tabulata corals	Coenites	C. hennigi		Could be bryozoan, described as tabulata elsewhere		
Rugosa corals	Giniophyllum	G. pyramidale	Bjärsjölagård quarry			Goniophyllum pyramidale
Rugosa corals	Cyathophyllum	C. dianthus	Bjärsjölagård quarry			
Rugosa corals	Palaeocyclus	P. porpitus	Bjärsjölagård quarry			
Rugosa corals	Pholidophyllum	P. tubulatum	Bjärsjölagård quarry			
Rugosa corals	Actinocystis	A. Grayi	Bjärsjölagård quarry			
Cornulariidae	Cornularids		Bjärsjölagård quarry	Rare		Cornularia cornucopiae
Crinoid	Unspecified		Bjärsjölagård quarry	Stems of both pentameric and holomeric types, in some asymplexial articulation.		Extant Crinoid
Ostracoda	Hermannina	H. sp	Bjärsjölagård quarry	Abundant		Extant Ostracod
Ostracoda	Beyrichia	B. gotlandica	Bjärsjölagård quarry	Less abundant than Hermannina		Extant Ostracod
Ostracoda	Beyrichia	B. lauensis	Bjärsjölagård quarry	Less abundant than Hermannina		
Trilobites	Calymene	C. lumenbaehi	Bjärsjölagård quarry			Calymene clavicula
Trilobites	Homalonotus	H. Knighti	Bjärsjölagård quarry			Homalonotus dekayi Beneski
Eurypterid	Eurypterus		Bjärsjölagård quarry	Many fragmentary remains found in several layers		Haeckel Eurypterus tetragonophthalmus
Tentaculita	Tentaculites	T. hisingeri	Bjärsjölagård quarry			Tentaculites bellulus
Tentaculita	Tentaculites	T. annulatus	Bjärsjölagård quarry			Tentaculites bellulus
Tentaculita	Lonchidium	L. scanicus	Bjärsjölagård quarry			
Stromatoporoidea	Labechia	L. conferta	Bjärsjölagård quarry	Sponges		Stromatoporoidea
Stromatoporoidea	Stromatopora	S. discoidea	Bjärsjölagård quarry	Sponges		Stromatoporoidea
Vertebrates	Ozarkodina	O. wimani	Bjärsjölagård quarry	5 species of Conodont. O. scanica is the most common. Used for the local biozones.		Conodont elements
Vertebrates	Ozarkodina	O. scanica	Bjärsjölagård quarry	5 species of Conodont. O. scanica is the most common. Used for the local biozones.		Conodont elements
Vertebrates	Ozarkodina	O. snajdri	Bjärsjölagård quarry	5 species of Conodont. O. scanica is the most common. Used for the local biozones.		Conodont elements
Vertebrates	Ozarkodina	unspecifed	Bjärsjölagård quarry	5 species of Conodont. O. scanica is the most common. Used for the local biozones.		Conodont elements
Vertebrates	Ozarkodina	unspecifed	Bjärsjölagård quarry	5 species of Conodont. O. scanica is the most common. Used for the local biozones.		Conodont elements
Graptolites			Bjärsjölagård quarry	fragments		

=== Plantae ===
Group	Genus	Species	Location	Notes	Ref	Images
Chlorophyta	Chaetocladus	C. gracilis	Bjärsjölagård quarry	Rare fossil alge		
Liverwort-like affinity and vascular plants	19 genera		Klinta formation and overlying Öved Sandstone formation	Cryptospores from early land plants		Cooksonia, a typical early land plant from the Silurian and Devonian period

== See also ==
- List of fossiliferous stratigraphic units in Sweden
- Geology of Gotland
- Burgsvik Beds
