= Klerf Formation =

Early Devonian formation with fossil Lagerstätte

- Stratigraphic range: Emsian; ~409–392 Ma
- Type: Geological formation
- Sub-units: Reifferscheid Mb. Altenberg Mb. Unterpreth Mb.
- Underlies: Heisdorf Formation
- Overlies: Schleiden Formation
- Thickness: 1,300 m (4,300 ft)

Lithology
- Primary: Siltstone, shale
- Other: Sandstone

Location
- Location: Eifel
- Coordinates: 50°14′48″N 06°27′21″W
- Region: Rhineland-Palatinate
- Country: Germany

Type section
- Named by: Richter
- Location: Willwerath near Prüm
- Year defined: 1919
- Coordinates: 50°14′48″N 06°27′21″W
- Approximate paleocoordinates: 27.1°S 09.7°E
- Region: Eifel
- Country: Germany
- Avalonia with the Proto-Tethys Ocean (3)

The Klerf Formation is an Early Devonian (Emsian) formation that includes a Lagerstätte in the Northern Eifel hills, at Willwerath near Prüm, Rhineland-Palatinate, Germany. In it Jaekelopterus rhenaniae, a giant eurypterid was discovered. The Klerf Formation, comprising greenish and reddish shales, siltstones and sandstones, was first described in 1919 by Rudolf Richter (1881-1957) and reaches a maximum thickness of about 1,300 metres (4,300 ft). It is part of Alken quarry along with Nellenköpfchen Formation.

== Depositional environment ==
The siltstone and sandstone formation was deposited in an estuarine to deltaic environment. This was located on the edge of Avalonia bordering the Proto-Tethys Ocean.

== Fossil content ==
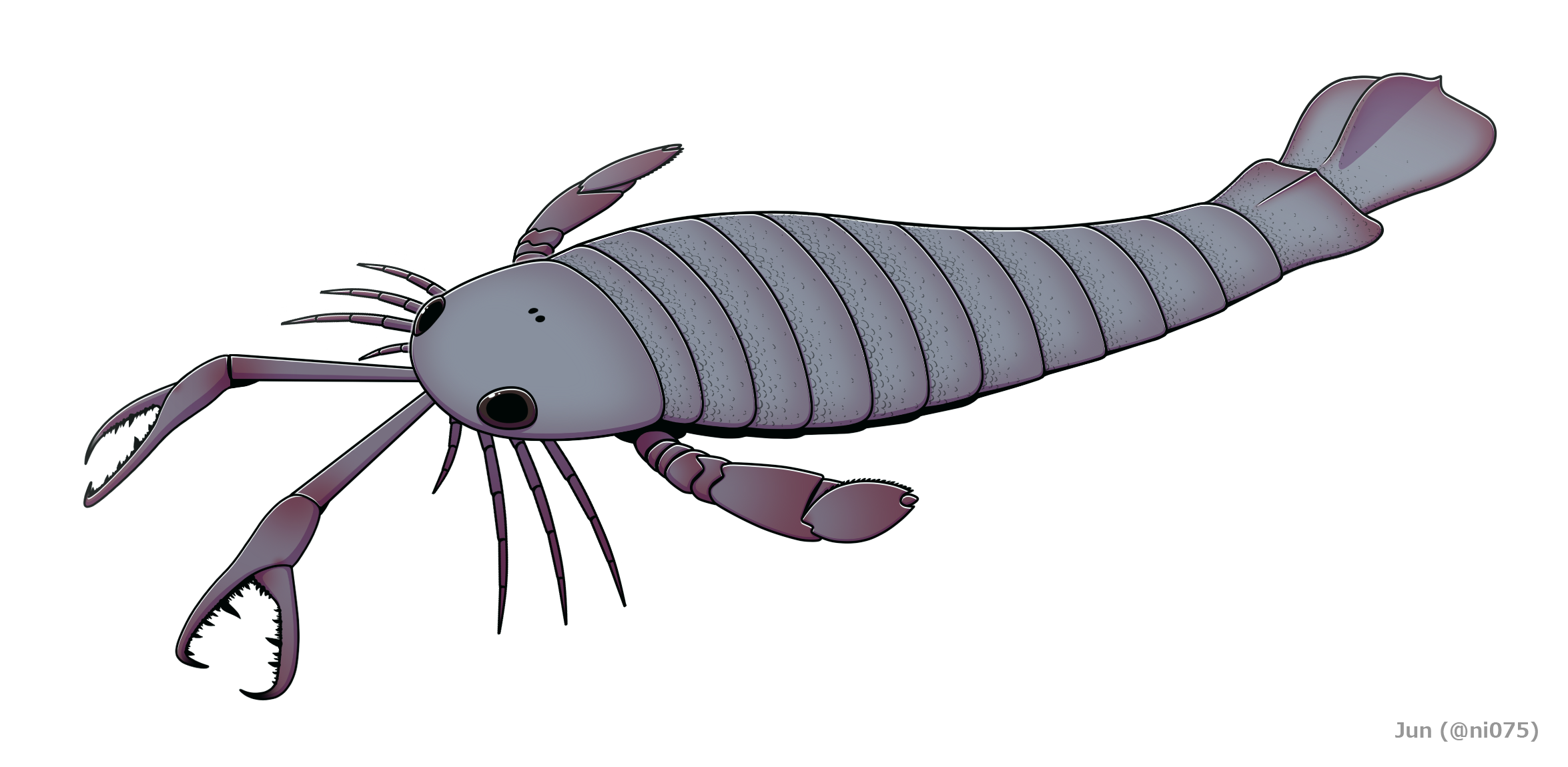
Restoration of J. rhenaniae

Apart from the largest arthropod, Jaekelopterus rhenaniae, found in the formation, it also preserved other eurypterids (Adelophthalmus sievertsi, Parahughmilleria hefteri, Rhenopterus diensti, Pruemopterus salgadoi, Erieopterus sp.), possible xiphosuran (Willwerathia), terrestrial arachnids (Devonotarbus hombachensis, Xenarachne willwerathensis), some fish, bryozoa, brachiopod and ostracod remains, Mutationella indet. and flora.

== See also ==
- List of fossiliferous stratigraphic units in Europe
- Geology of Germany
- Floresta Formation
- Old Port Formation
