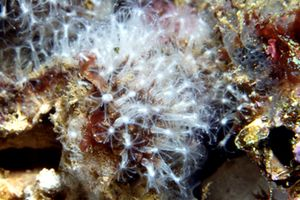
- Cornularia cornucopiae coral

Scientific classification
- Kingdom: Animalia
- Phylum: Cnidaria
- Subphylum: Anthozoa
- Class: Octocorallia
- Order: Scleralcyonacea
- Family: Cornulariidae; Dana, 1846

Genera
- See text

= Cornulariidae =

Family of corals

Cornulariidae is a family of soft corals in the order Scleralcyonacea.

== Genera ==
The World Register of Marine Species includes a single genus in the family:

- Cornularia Lamarck, 1816

Prior to a 2022 taxonomic revision of Octocorallia corals, a second genus was included:

- Cervera Lopez-Gonzalez, Ocana, Garcia-Gomez & Nunez, 1995 (now placed in family Cerveridae).
