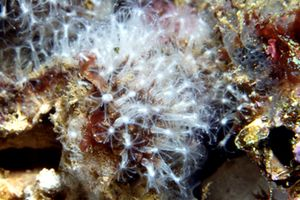
- Cornularia cornucopiae

Scientific classification
- Kingdom: Animalia
- Phylum: Cnidaria
- Subphylum: Anthozoa
- Class: Octocorallia
- Order: Scleralcyonacea
- Family: Cornulariidae
- Genus: Cornularia; Lamarck, 1816 ]

Species
- See text

= Cornularia (coral) =

Genus of corals

Cornularia is a genus of soft corals in the monotypic family Cornulariidae in the order Scleralcyonacea.

== Species ==
The World Register of Marine Species includes the following species in the genus:

- Cornularia cornucopiae (Pallas, 1766)
- Cornularia pabloi McFadden & van Ofwegen, 2012

Some other species formerly place in this genus have been transferred to Cervera.
