= Cornularia (fungus) =

Scientific classification
- Kingdom: Fungi
- Division: Ascomycota
- Class: Leotiomycetes
- Order: Helotiales
- Family: Dermateaceae
- Genus: Cornularia Sacc., 1884

Species
- Several, including: Cornularia abietis (type); Cornularia elegans

Synonyms
- Corniculariella P. Karst., 1884; Collonaemella Höhn., 1915; Chondropodium Höhn., 1916

Genus of fungi

Cornularia is a genus of fungi in the family Dermateaceae.
