= Medusagraptus =

Medusagraptus Temporal range: Upper Silurian

Scientific classification
- Clade: Viridiplantae
- Division: Chlorophyta
- Class: Ulvophyceae
- Order: Dasycladales
- Family: incertae sedis
- Genus: †Medusagraptus

Species
- M. graminiformis; M. miribalas; M. hispidus; M. setaceus; M. pavonicus; M. floralis; M. divaricuatus; M. plumosus

Extinct genus of algae

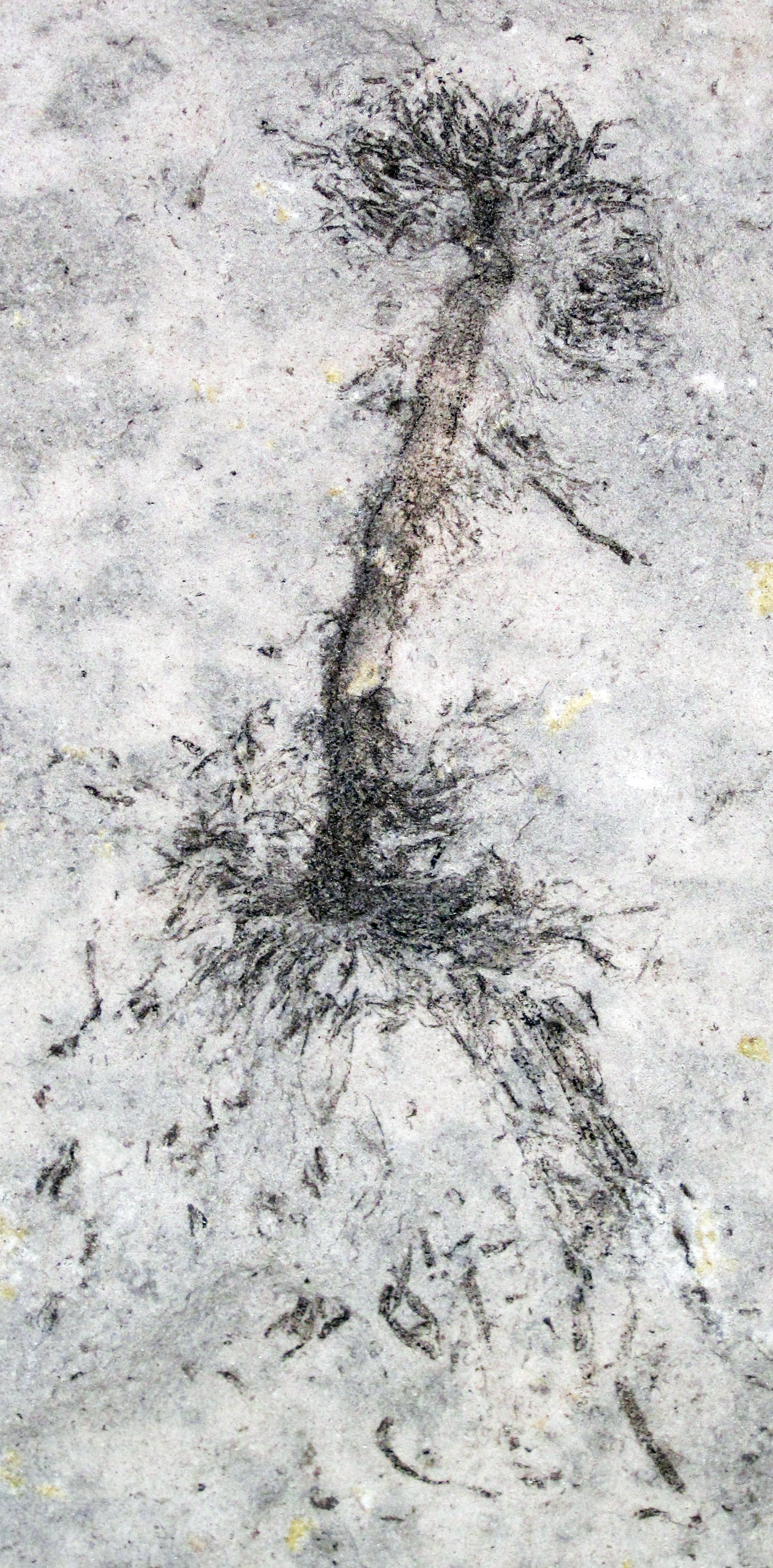
Medusaegraptus fossil algae

Medusagraptus is a genus of dasycladalean green alga.
