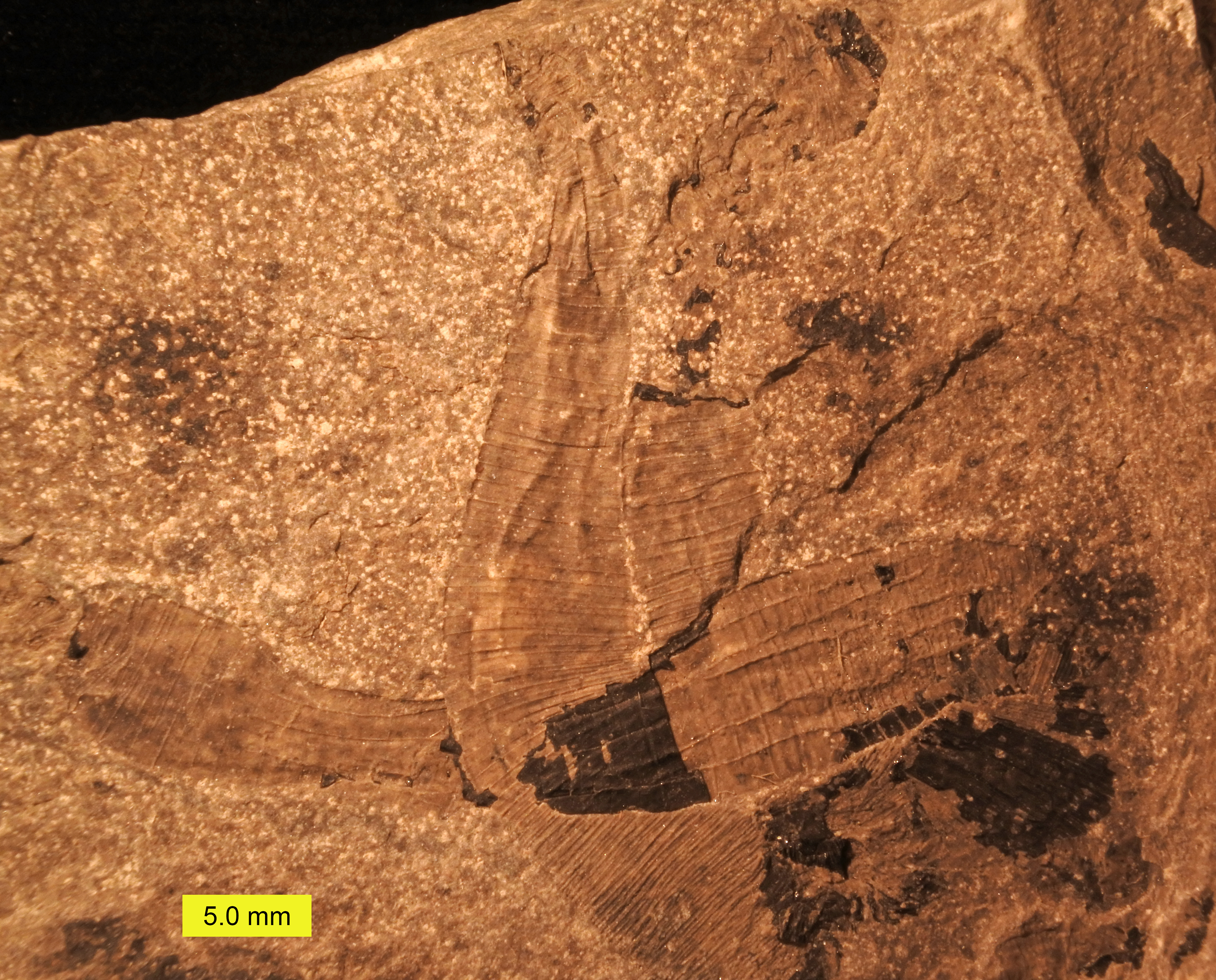
- Lecthaylus gregarius

Scientific classification
- Kingdom: Animalia
- Phylum: Annelida
- Class: Sipuncula
- Subclass: incertae sedis
- Genus: †Lecthaylus

= Lecthaylus =

Lecthaylus Temporal range: Cambrian – Lower Carboniferous

Extinct genus of worms

Lecthaylus is a genus of fossil sipunculid worms that lived between the Cambrian and the Lower Carboniferous periods.

Sipunculid worms are sedentary marine worms without any mineralised parts, and for this reason are very rare in the fossil record. Lecthaylus gregarius was described by the American geologist and palaentologist Stuart Weller in 1925 from the Silurian strata near Chicago. Professor Weller described this worm, which was abundant in the deposits, as being "manifestly related to Serpulites or Conularia; however, further examination by Sharat Kumar Roy determined that this was not the case, and that the worms were more likely members of Sipunculoidea, and this is now the accepted position.

A related species of sipunculan was discovered in 2007 in the Granton Shrimp Bed near Edinburgh and was first described by L. A. Muir and J. P. Botting, who placed it in the genus Lecthaylus.
