= Virgilian series =

The Virgilian series is the youngest part of the Pennsylvanian epoch in the North American geologic classification series. During Virgilian times, the top of the Conemaugh and the entire Monongahela group were deposited. As with other Carboniferous series, it comprises cyclothems, or distinct cycles of sedimentary rock formation.

== Monongahela cyclothems (youngest at top) ==
Note: the names below are of the Conemaugh age, not Monongahela age

- Upper Little Pittsburgh
- Lower Little Pittsburgh
- Little Clarksburgh
- Elk Lick
- Duquesne
- Gaysport
- Ames
- Harlem
- Upper Bakerstown
- Anderson
- Wilgus
- Upper Brush Creek
- Lower Brush Creek
- Mason
- Mahoning
