= Kalana lagerstätte =

Sedimentary deposit in Estonia

- Stratigraphic range: Aeronian
- Type: Lagerstätte
- Unit of: Nurmekund Formation

Lithology
- Primary: Limestone

Location
- Country: Estonia

Type section
- Named for: Kalana, Jõgeva County

The Kalana lagerstätte is a lagerstätte from the early Silurian of Estonia, contained within the Nurmekund Formation. It contains a fairly diverse biota of algae and crinoids, alongside the earliest osteostracan known.

== Paleobiota ==
Color key
Taxon	Reclassified taxon	Taxon falsely reported as present	Dubious taxon or junior synonym	Ichnotaxon	Ootaxon	Morphotaxon

Notes
Uncertain or tentative taxa are in small text; ~~crossed out~~ taxa are discredited.

Paleobiota
Genus	Species	Higher taxon	Notes	Images
Kalanaspis	K. delectabilis	Osteostraci	Earliest osteostracan known, preserved in an unusual carbonaceous mode of preservation	Reconstruction of Kalanaspis
Kalanacrinus	K. mastikae	Dimerocrinitidae (Camerata)	Resembles Cybelecrinus	
Oepikicrinus	O. perensae	Dimerocrinitidae (Camerata)	Fairly small dimerocrinitid	
Rozhnovicrinus	R. isakarae	Dendrocrinidae (Camerata)	Distinguished by an odd anal plate arrangement	
Tartucrinus	T. kalanaensis	Iocrinidae (Disparida)	Provisionally assigned to Iocrinidae due to a lack of preserved distinguishing morphology	
Clintonella	C. aprinis	Atrypinidae (Atrypida)	Known from across the Baltic region	
Palaeocymopolia	P. silurica	Dasycladales	Resembles the modern Cymopolia	
Kalania	K. pusilla	Dasycladales	Unbranched with hairy tips	
Leveilleites	L. hartnageli	Rhodophyta?	Also found in North America	
