= Isady =

Isady Исады
- Khutor
- Location within Vologda Oblast Location within Russia
- Coordinates: 58°48′N 41°01′E
- Country: Russia
- Region: Vologda Oblast
- District: Gryazovetsky District
- Time zone: UTC+3:00

Isady (Russian: Исады) is a rural locality (a khutor) in Vokhtozhskoye Rural Settlement, Gryazovetsky District, Vologda Oblast, Russia. The population was 52 as of 2002. There are 10 streets.

== Geography ==
Isady is located 58 km (36 mi) southeast of Gryazovets (the district's administrative centre) by road. Vokhtoga is the nearest rural locality.
