= Sedan (Lagerstätte) =

Jurassic echinoderm Lagerstätte

- Stratigraphic range: Pliensbachian

Lithology
- Primary: Dark grey claystone

Location
- Coordinates: 49.7°N 4.9°E
- Approximate paleocoordinates: 39.9°N 20.1°E
- Region: Grand Est
- Country: France

The Sedan Lagerstätte is a Pliensbachian, early Jurassic fossil Lagerstätte from the Ardennes, eastern France. It provides numerous well-preserved fossils of diverse echinoderms.
The estimated paleocoordinates of 39.9°N 20.1°E are taken from the Paleobiology Database.

== Biota ==
Genus	Species	Notes
Balanocrinus	B. gracilis	An Isocrinida crinoid.
Palaeocomaster	P. benthuyi	A Comatulid crinoid.
Inexpectacantha	I. acrobatica	An Ophiacanthida ophiuroid.
Palaeocoma	P. milleri	An Ophiacanthida ophiuroid.
Eirenura	E. papillata	An Ophiurida ophiuroid.
Sinosura	S. brodiei	An Ophiurida ophiuroid.
Ophiomusium	O. murravii	An Ophiurida ophiuroid.
Ophiura?	O? astonensis	An Ophiurida ophiuroid. The attribution of jurassic species to the extant genus Ophiura is untenable.
Aspiduriella?	A?sp.	Might represent a relict species of the triassic Ophiurida Aspiduriella.
Tropidaster	T. pectinatus	Asteroidea.
Plumaster	sp.nov.	Asteroidea.
Achistrum	A. cf.monochordatum	Holothuroidea.
Binoculites	B. jurassica	Holothuroidea.
Indet.	Indet.	A new species of chiridotid.
Eodiadema	sp.	An Echinoida.
Modiolus	sp.	A bivalve.

== Paleoecology and environment ==
The echinoderms and bivalves are present in repeated distinct beds, suggesting that they were regularly buried by storm-related sedimentation events (obrution). It is interpreted as intervals of reduced sediment input followed by high-energy storm deposition. The general climate was warm.
