= St. Maughan's Formation =

Geological formation in Wales

- Stratigraphic range: Devonian
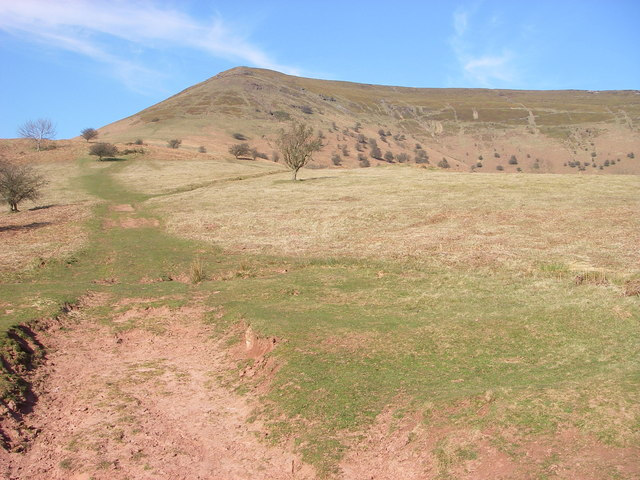
- Mynydd Troed, the base of the hill consisting of St. Maughan's Formation
- Type: Formation
- Unit of: Old Red Sandstone

Lithology
- Primary: Mudstone
- Other: Sandstone, Conglomerate

Location
- Region: Wales
- Country: United Kingdom

The St. Maughan's Formation is a geologic formation in Wales. It preserves fossils dating back to the Devonian period.

== See also ==
- List of fossiliferous stratigraphic units in Wales
