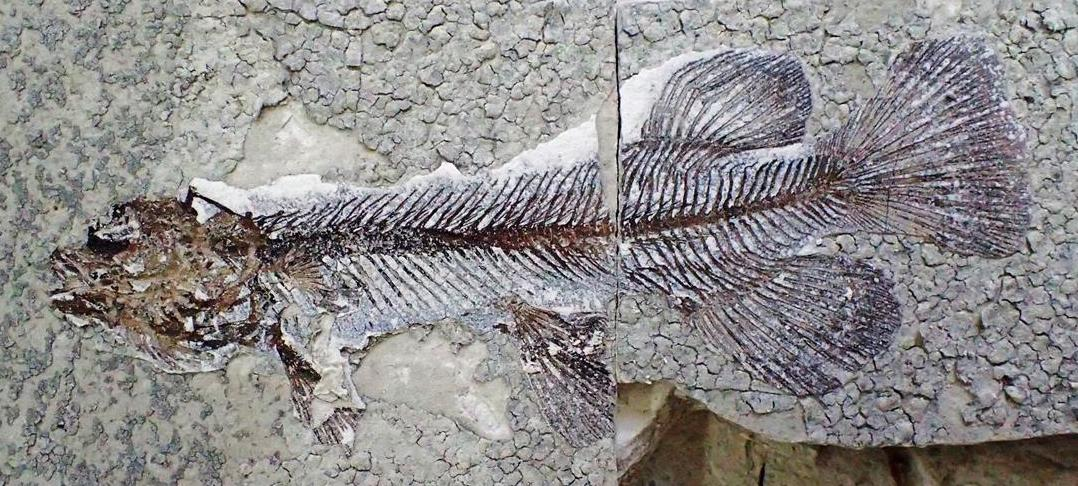

Scientific classification
- Domain: Eukaryota
- Kingdom: Animalia
- Phylum: Chordata
- Class: Actinopterygii
- Order: Galaxiiformes
- Family: Galaxiidae
- Genus: Galaxias
- Species: †G. effusus

Binomial name
- †Galaxias effusus Lee, McDowell, & Lindqvist, 2007

= Galaxias effusus =

Galaxias effusus Temporal range: Early Miocene

Species of fish

Galaxias effusus is an extinct species of fish in the genus Galaxias, known only from 23-million-year-old fossils from New Zealand. It is named for its dramatically large dorsal, tail, and anal fins, which are much larger than those of any living New Zealand galaxiid. It is the earliest known member of the Southern Hemisphere family Galaxiiidae.

The species was identified from fossils collected in 2005 from the early Miocene deposit Foulden Maar, near Middlemarch in Central Otago. Foulden Maar was a deep crater lake 23 million years ago, then gradually filled in over about 100,000 years, preserving fossil plants and animals in its cool anoxic depths between layers of diatoms. At some point the lake probably breached its rim, perhaps during a flood, creating a waterway through which fishes could enter and form a landlocked non-migratory population. The exceptionally-well-preserved fossils of G. effusus were recovered by manually splitting layers of soft diatomite.
