= Waubakee Formation =

Eastern North American marine sedimentary rock

- Stratigraphic range: Late Silurian
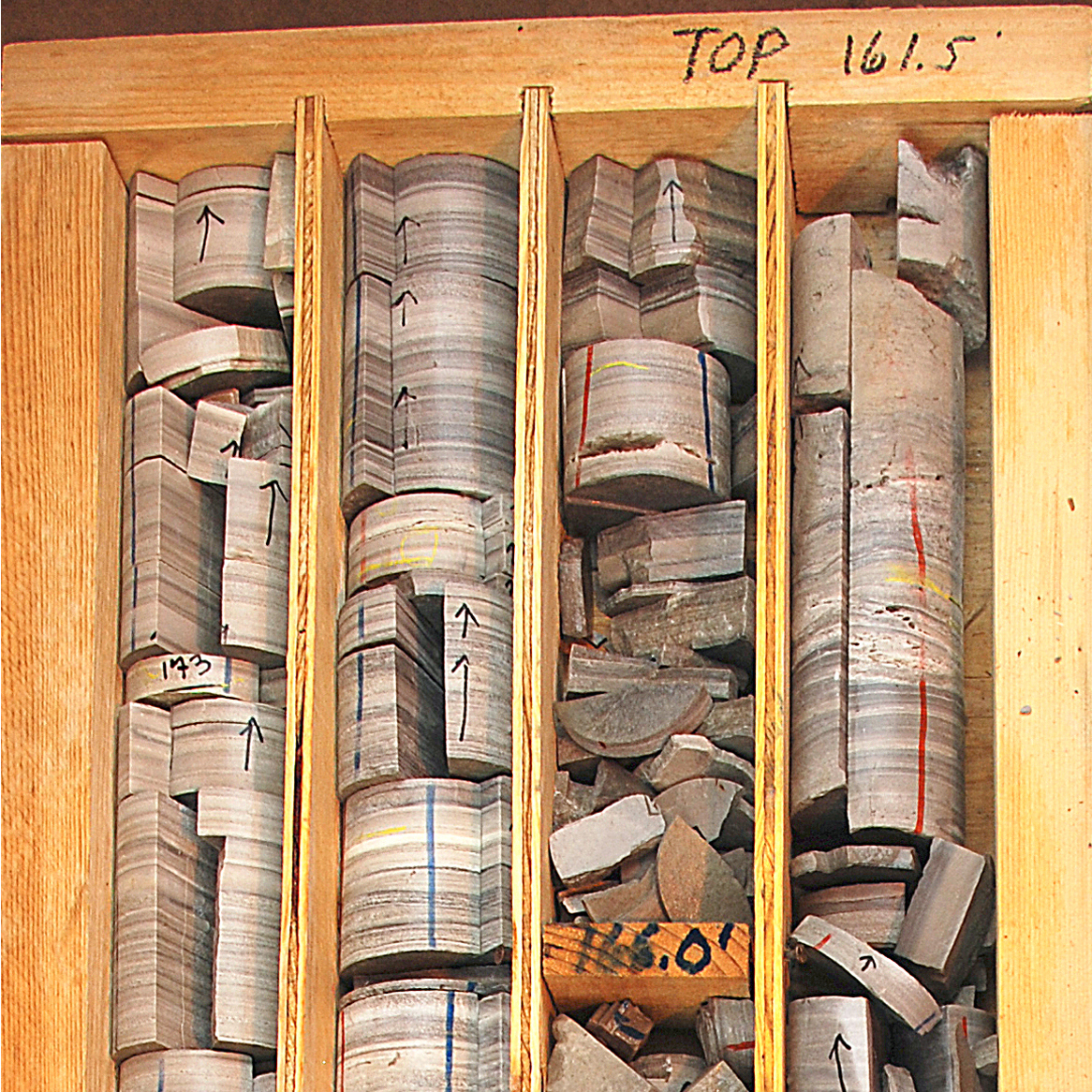
- Drill core of the Waubakee Formation
- Type: Geological formation
- Underlies: Thiensville Formation
- Overlies: Racine Formation
- Thickness: 18 to 33 meters (59 to 108 feet)

Lithology
- Primary: dolomite

Location
- Region: Eastern Wisconsin, at the boundary of the Wisconsin Arch and the Michigan Basin
- Country: United States
- Extent: Milwaukee, Ozaukee, and Sheboygan Counties, Wisconsin

Type section
- Named for: Waubeka, Wisconsin
- Named by: Alden (1906)

The Waubakee Formation (also referred to as the Waubakee Limestone or Waubakee Dolostone) is a unit of marine sedimentary rock found in eastern North America. Named for distinctive outcrops along the banks of the Milwaukee River near the village of Waubeka, Wisconsin, in the United States. The unit is composed primarily of fine-grained dolomicrite that is finely laminated and conspicuously unfossiliferous. Owing to the lack of useful index fossils, its age is not well constrained, though most scientists consider it the youngest Silurian stratigraphic unit in Wisconsin.
