= Lakhanda Group =

Geologic formation in Russia

- Stratigraphic range: 1000-1030 Ma
- Type: Group
- Underlies: Ui Group
- Overlies: Kerpyl' Group
- Thickness: ~420 m

Location
- Region: Sakha Republic
- Country: Russia

The Lakhanda Group is a group of late Mesoproterozoic formations from Siberia. It contains several of the earliest eukaryotes which can be placed into modern groups, including the earliest xanthophyte algae, fungi and possibly even the first animals.

== Paleobiota ==
Color key: Taxon / Reclassified taxon / Taxon falsely reported as present / Dubious taxon or junior synonym / Ichnotaxon / Ootaxon / Morphotaxon	Notes; Uncertain or tentative taxa are in small text; ~~crossed out~~ taxa are discredited.

=== Paleobiota ===
Paleobiota
Genus	Species	Notes	Images
Palaeovaucheria	P. clavata	Filamentous xanthophyte alga.	
Aimonema	A. ramosa	Filamentous fungus, possibly within Ascomycota. May be related to nematophagous fungi, and may even have had a similar lifestyle due to possible worm-like fossils also being found in Lakhanda.	
Mucorites	M. ripheicus	Fungal zygospores, possibly within Mucorales?	
Eosaccharomyces	E. ramosus	Fungal fossils, likely related to modern yeast.	
Mycosphaeroides	M. aggregatus	Material consists of amoeboid aggregations and individual cells, the genus is likely related to Myxomycetes.	
Fungi indet.	Unapplicable	Similar to the Canadian Ourasphaira	
Rugosoopsis	R. tenuis	Possible vermiform animal, earliest record of Animalia if this is true.	
Porifera? indet.	Unapplicable	Microfossils similar to sponges (more specifically members of Hexactinellida), found on numerous other taxa from the site.	
Lomentunella	L. vaginata	Multicellular alga, similar to the modern Ulothrix.	
Palmella	P. sp	Enigmatic fossil	
Eosolena	E. anisocyta; E. loculosa	Enigmatic filamentous fossil, member of the clade Eosolenides	Line drawing of Eosolena loculosa
Elatera	E. binata; E. rotundata; E. unistriata	Enigmatic filamentous fossil, member of the clade Eosolenides	Line drawing of Elatera unistriata
Itirinda	I. insueta; I. decliva; I. saccata; I. renaria	Enigmatic budding fossil, claimed to have affinities to hydrozoan polyps	
Caudosphaera	C. expansa	Sporangium-like fossil	
Germinosphaera	G. bispinosa	Sporangium-like fossil	
Jacutinema	J. solubila	Sporangium-like fossil	
Siphonophycus	S. typicus; S. kestron	Cyanobacteria	Line drawing reconstruction of Siphonophycus attenuatum
Polytrichoides	P. lineatus	Cyanobacteria	
Palaeolyngbya	P. sp	Cyanobacteria	Line drawing reconstruction of Palaeolyngbya helva
Chuaria	C. sp	Widespread enigmatic fossil	Specimen from China
Lakhandia	L. sp	Acritarch	
Trachyhystricosphaera	T. aimika	Acritarch	
Majasphaeridium	M. lakhandinium; M. carpogenum	Acritarch	
Radiatosphaera	R. solida; R. glumacea	Acritarch	
Cypandinia	C. supracomposita	Acritarch	
Valeria	V. lophostriata	Acritarch	
Fabiformis	F. porosus	Colonial microbes, possibly bacteria?	
