= Mount Cap formation =

Geologic formation in Canada

Coordinates: 63°24′23″N 123°12′22″W

Mount Cap Formation
- Stratigraphic range: Cambrian
- Type: Formation

Lithology
- Primary: Shale, siltstone
- Other: Sandstone

Location
- Region: Northwest Territories
- Country: Canada
- Mount Cap formation (Canada)

The Mount Cap Formation is a geologic formation exposed in the Mackenzie Mountains, northern Canada. It was deposited in a shallow shelf setting in the late Early Cambrian, and contains an array of Burgess Shale-type microfossils that have been recovered by acid maceration.

== Description ==
The formation is 100 to 300 metres (330 to 980 ft), and comprises shales, siltstones and sandstones with a high glauconite content. It has been exposed to remarkably little metamorphic activity given its great age; it is dated to the Bonnia–Olenellus Trilobite Zone. This zone lies within the Lower Cambrian Waucoban stage in North America, which is equivalent to the Caerfai in Wales, and thus the Comley of England, and has yet to be formally ratified. Nevertheless, this makes it just younger than the earliest trilobites, and thus the earliest known Burgess Shale-type deposit, though this is disputable when considering the age of Chengjiang County fauna. Its organic-walled fauna, known as the "Little Bear biota", includes both non-mineralized and originally-mineralized taxa, including hyolith and trilobite fragments, anomalocaridid claws, arthropod carapaces and brachiopods.

== See also ==
- List of fossiliferous stratigraphic units in Northwest Territories
