= 2011 in paleoichthyology =

== Fishes ==
=== Newly named jawless vertebrates ===
Name	Novelty	Status	Authors	Age	Unit	Location	Notes	Images
Althaspis tarloi	sp.	Valid	Voichyshyn	Early Devonian	Dniester Formation	Ukraine	A heterostracan	
Djurinaspis secunda	sp.	Valid	Voichyshyn	Early Devonian	Tyver Formation	Ukraine	A heterostracan	
Lechriaspis	Gen. et sp.	Valid	Elliott; Petriello	Early Devonian	Water Canyon Formation	USA	A heterostracan	
Palanasaspis	Gen. et sp.	Valid	Voichyshyn	Early Devonian	Dniester Formation	Ukraine	A heterostracan	
Podolaspis danieli	sp.	Valid	Voichyshyn	Early Devonian	Dniester Formation	Ukraine	A heterostracan	
Poraspis thomasi	Species	Valid	Elliott; Petriello	Early Devonian	Lost Burro Formation	USA	A heterostracan	
Semipodolaspis	Gen. et sp.	Valid	Voichyshyn	Early Devonian	Tyver Formation	Ukraine	A heterostracan	
Shuyu	Gen. et comb.	Valid	Gai; Donoghue; et al. (Note: Gai, Donoghue, Zhu, Janvier, Stampanoni.)	Late Telychian/Early Wenlock	Maoshan Formation	China	The basalmost known eugaleaspidiform galeaspid.	
Zenaspis kasymyri	sp.	Valid	Voichyshyn	Early Devonian	Dniester Formation	Ukraine	A osteostracan	

=== Newly named acanthodian ===
Name	Novelty	Status	Authors	Age	Unit	Location	Notes	Images
Nerepisacanthus	Gen. et sp.	Valid	Burrow	?Telychian/Ludlow	Cunningham Creek Formation	Canada	An acritolepid ischnacanthiform.	

=== Newly named placoderms ===
Name	Status	Authors	Age	Unit	Location	Notes	Images
Arabosteus	Valid	Olive et al.	Early Devonian	Jauf Formation	Saudi Arabia	A member of Acanthothoraci. The type species is Arabosteus variabilis.	
Draconichthys elegans	Valid	Rücklin	Frasnian	Anti-Atlas Mountains	Morocco	A piscivorous selenosteid arthrodire	

=== Newly named cartilaginous fishes ===
Name	Novelty	Status	Authors	Age	Unit	Location	Notes	Images
Cederstroemia ziaensis	Species	Valid	Bourdon et al.	Late Cretaceous (Santonian)	Point Lookout Sandstone	United States	A carpet shark, a species of Cederstroemia.	
Dwardius sudindicus	Species	Valid	Underwood; Goswami; et al. (Note: Underwood, Goswami Prasad, Verma and Flynn)	Early Cenomanian	Karai Formation	India	An otodontid.	
Eorhinoptera	Gen. et sp. nov	Valid	Case, Cook & Wilson	Early Eocene (Ypresian)	Fishburne Formation	United States	A stingray related to the genus Rhinoptera. The type species is Eorhinoptera grabdai.	
Ertychius	Gen. et sp. nov	Valid	Ginter, Hairapetian & Grigoryan	Devonian (early Famennian)		Armenia	A ctenacanthiform. The type species is Ertychius intermedius.	
Fayolia sharovi	Species	Valid	Fischer; Voigt; et al. (Note: Fischer, Voigt, Schneider, Buchwitz and Voigt)	Middle/Late Triassic	Madygen Formation	Kyrgyzstan	Egg capsules of a probable xenacanthid.	
Gladioserratus	Gen. et comb. et sp. nov	Valid	Underwood; Goswami; et al.	Cretaceous (Hauterivian) to Paleocene (Danian) or possibly even early Eocene		Australia; Denmark; France; India; United Kingdom	A cow shark, a new genus for "Notidanus" aptiensis (Pictet, 1865). Genus also contains a new species Gladioserratus magnus; it might also contain Eocene species "Notorynchus" serratissimus Agassiz (1843).	
Karksiodus	Gen. et sp. nov	Valid	Ivanov, Märss & Kleesment	Devonian (Givetian)		Estonia	A member of Elasmobranchii of uncertain phylogenetic placement. The type species is Karksiodus mirus.	
Kawichthys	Gen. et sp.	Valid	Pradel; Tafforeau; et al. (Note: Pradel, Tafforeau, Maisey, Janvier.)	Late Virgilian	Douglas Group	USA	A symmoriiform.	
Lissodus lusavorichi	Sp. nov	Valid	Ginter, Hairapetian & Grigoryan	Devonian (late Famennian)		Armenia; Iran	A lonchidiid hybodontiform, a species of Lissodus.	
Lonchidion ferganensis	Species	Valid	Fischer; Voigt; et al.	Middle/Late Triassic	Madygen Formation	Kyrgyzstan	A hybodontid shark.	
Moerigaleus	Gen. et sp. nov	Valid	Underwood & Ward	Late Eocene		Egypt	A hemigaleid. The type species is Moerigaleus vitreodon.	
Palaeoxyris alterna	Species	Valid	Fischer; Voigt; et al.	Middle/Late Triassic	Madygen Formation	Kyrgyzstan	A hybodontid shark.	
Ptychodus atcoensis	Species	Valid	Hamm; Cicimurri	Late Cretaceous (early Coniacian)	Atco Formation	United States	A species of Ptychodus.	
Pueblocarcharias	Gen. et sp. nov	Valid	Bourdon et al.	Late Cretaceous (Santonian)	Point Lookout Sandstone	United States	A sand shark. The type species is Pueblocarcharias kawaikensis.	
Reginaselache	Gen. et sp.	Valid	Turner; Burrow	Middle Viséan	Ducabrook Formation	Australia	A xenacanthiform.	
Scapanorhynchus puercoensis	Sp. nov	Valid	Bourdon et al.	Late Cretaceous (Santonian)	Point Lookout Sandstone	United States	A mitsukurinid, a species of Scapanorhynchus.	
Scindocorax	Gen. et sp. nov	Valid	Bourdon et al.	Late Cretaceous (Santonian)	Point Lookout Sandstone	United States	An anacoracid. The type species is Scindocorax novimexicanus.	
Tassiliodus	Gen. et sp.	Valid	Derycke; Goujet	Emsian, Devonian		Algeria	A euselachian.	
Texatrygon stouti	Sp. nov	Valid	Bourdon et al.	Late Cretaceous (Santonian)	Point Lookout Sandstone	United States	A relative of Ptychotrygon and sclerorhynchids, a species of Texatrygon.	

=== Newly named bony fishes ===
Name	Novelty	Status	Authors	Age	Unit	Location	Notes	Images
Apogon dominans	Sp. nov	Valid	Brzobohatý; Nolf	Eocene (Bartonian)		Spain	A cardinalfish, a species of Apogon.	
"genus aff. Apogon" viaboadai	Sp. nov	Valid	Brzobohatý; Nolf	Eocene (Bartonian)		Spain	A cardinalfish related to members of the genus Apogon.	
Apricenaichthys	Gen. et sp. nov	Valid	Taverne	Late Cretaceous (Santonian)		Italy	A beardfish. The type species is Apricenaichthys italicus.	
Araripichthys weberi	Species	Valid	Alvarado-Ortega; Brito	Albian	Tlayúa Formation	Mexico	An elopocephalan, a species of Araripichthys.	
Arius subtilis	Sp. nov	Valid	Schwarzhans; Bratishko	Late Cretaceous (Maastrichtian) and Paleocene (Danian and Selandian)		Ukraine; United States	An ariid catfish, a species of Arius.	
Astroscopus countermani	Species	Valid	Carnevale, Godfrey & Pietsch	Miocene (Tortonian)	St. Marys Formation	United States	A stargazer, a species of Astroscopus.	
Aulorhamphus chiarasorbiniae	Sp. nov	Valid	Tyler & Bannikov	Eocene	Monte Bolca locality	Italy	An aulorhamphid gasterosteiform, a species of Aulorhamphus.	
Beishanichthys	Gen. et sp.	Valid	Xu; Gao	Early Triassic		China	A scanilepiform.	
Belonostomus lamarquensis	Sp. nov	Valid	Bogan; Taverne; Agnolin	Late Cretaceous (Campanian-Maastrichtian)	Allen Formation	Argentina	An aspidorhynchiform.	
Bourbonnella jocelynae	Species	Valid	Mickle	Carboniferous	Manning Canyon Shale Formation	USA	An aeduellid.	
"genus Bythitidarum" rozenbergi	Sp. nov	Valid	Schwarzhans; Bratishko	Paleocene (Selandian)		Ukraine	A viviparous brotula of uncertain generic assignment.	
Caucasichthys	Gen. et sp.	Valid	Bannikov; Carnevale; Parin	Bartonian		Russia	A perciform.	
Centroberyx anguinicauda	Sp. nov	Valid	Schwarzhans; Bratishko	Paleocene (Selandian)		Ukraine	A member of Berycidae, a species of Centroberyx.	
Chaetodipterus steurbauti	Sp. nov	Valid	Brzobohatý; Nolf	Eocene (Bartonian)		Spain	A spadefish, a species of Chaetodipterus.	
Chlorophthalmus udovichenkoi	Sp. nov	Valid	Schwarzhans; Bratishko	Paleocene (Selandian)		Ukraine	A greeneye, a species of Chlorophthalmus.	
Dapedium stollorum	Species	Valid	Thies; Hauff	Early Toarcian		Germany	A species of Dapedium.	
"genus Epigonidarum" tyassminensis	Sp. nov	Valid	Schwarzhans; Bratishko	Paleocene (Selandian)		Ukraine	A deepwater cardinalfish of uncertain generic assignment.	
Fierasferoides bucculentus	Sp. nov	Valid	Schwarzhans; Bratishko	Paleocene (Selandian)		Ukraine	A pearlfish, a species of Fierasferoides.	
Gadophycis serratus	Sp. nov	Valid	Schwarzhans; Bratishko	Paleocene (Selandian)		Ukraine	A cusk-eel, a species of Gadophycis.	
Guntherichthys	Gen. et sp.	Valid	Mickle	Carboniferous	Manning Canyon Shale Formation	USA	A ’palaeoniscoid’.	
Gwawinapterus	Gen. et sp.	Valid	Arbour; Currie	Campanian	Northumberland Formation	Canada	Initially thought to be an istiodactylid pterosaur, but subsequently reinterpreted as an indeterminate saurodontid fish.	
Habroichthys broughi	Sp. nov	Valid	Lin et al.	Middle Triassic (Anisian)	Guanling Formation	China	A member of Peltopleuriformes belonging to the family Habroichthyidae.	
"genus Haemulidarum" makarenkoi	Sp. nov	Valid	Schwarzhans; Bratishko	Paleocene (Selandian)		Ukraine	A grunt of uncertain generic assignment.	
Heteroconger astroblematicus	Sp. nov	Valid	Schwarzhans; Bratishko	Paleocene (Selandian)		Ukraine	A member of Congridae, a species of Heteroconger.	
"genus Holocentridarum" ryabchuni	Sp. nov	Valid	Schwarzhans; Bratishko	Paleocene (Selandian)		Ukraine	A member of Holocentridae of uncertain generic assignment.	
Huashancyprinus	Gen. et sp. nov	Valid	Chen; Chang	Oligocene	Ningming Formation	China	A member of Cyprinidae. The type species is H. robustispinus.	
Laccognathus embryi	Species	Valid	Downs; Daeschler; et al. (Note: Downs, Daeschler, Jenkins and Shubin.)	Frasnian	Fram Formation	Canada	A porolepiform sarcopterygian.	
Lecceclupea	Gen. et sp. nov	Valid	Taverne	Late Cretaceous (Campanian-Maastrichtian boundary)		Italy	A member of Clupeidae belonging to the subfamily Pellonulinae and the tribe Ehiravini. The type species is Lecceclupea ehiravaensis.	
"genus Leiognathidarum" tashlikensis	Sp. nov	Valid	Schwarzhans; Bratishko	Paleocene (Selandian)		Ukraine	A ponyfish of uncertain generic assignment.	
Lepidotes pankowskii	Species	Valid	Forey; López-Arbarello; MacLeod	Cenomanian	Kem Kem Group	Morocco	Originally described as a species of Lepidotes; subsequently made the type species of a separate genus Adrianaichthys.	
Leufuichthys	Gen. et sp.	Valid	Gallo; Calvo; Kellner	Turonian/Coniacian	Portezuelo Formation	Argentina	A clupeomorph.	
Maorigadus ukrainicus	Sp. nov	Valid	Schwarzhans; Bratishko	Paleocene (Selandian)		Ukraine	A member of Gadiformes of uncertain phylogenetic placement, related to the family Muraenolepididae; a species of Maorigadus.	
Mene iberica	Sp. nov	Valid	Brzobohatý; Nolf	Eocene (Bartonian)		Spain	A species of Mene.	
"genus Merlucciidarum" antiquus	Sp. nov	Valid	Schwarzhans; Bratishko	Paleocene (Selandian)		Ukraine	A member of Merlucciidae of uncertain generic assignment.	
Mimipiscis	Nom. nov.	Valid	Choo	Upper Devonian	Gogo Formation	Australia	A new generic name for Mimia Gardiner & Bartram (1977). The type species is Mimipiscis toombsi (Gardiner & Bartram 1977).	
Mimipiscis bartrami	Species	Valid	Choo	Upper Devonian	Gogo Formation	Australia	A second species of Mimipiscis.	
Neocybium parvidentatum	Species	Valid	Monsch; Bannikov	Eocene (Bartonian)		Kazakhstan	A Spanish mackerel, a species of Neocybium.	
Ogilbia luzanensis	Sp. nov	Valid	Schwarzhans; Bratishko	Paleocene (Danian to Selandian)		Denmark; Greenland; Ukraine	A viviparous brotula, a species of Ogilbia.	
Onuxodon yebraensis	Sp. nov	Valid	Brzobohatý; Nolf	Eocene (Bartonian)		Spain	A pearlfish, a species of Onuxodon.	
Pardachirus izarrae	Sp. nov	Valid	Brzobohatý; Nolf	Eocene (Bartonian)		Spain	A sole, a species of Pardachirus.	
Pavarottia	Gen. et sp. nov	Valid	Bannikov & Zorzin	Eocene	Monte Bolca locality	Italy	A member of Percoidei of uncertain phylogenetic placement. The type species is Pavarottia lonardonii.	
Pesciarhamphus	Sp. nov	Valid	Tyler & Bannikov	Eocene (Ypresian or Lutetian)	Monte Bolca locality	Italy	An aulorhamphid gasterosteiform. The type species is Pesciarhamphus carnevalei.	
Pietschellus	Gen. et sp.	Valid	Bannikov; Carnevale	Ypresian	Monte Bolca	Italy	A percomorph.	
Robertannia	Gen. et sp. nov	Valid	Bannikov	Eocene	Monte Bolca locality	Italy	A member of Percoidei of uncertain phylogenetic placement, related to Hendrixella grandei. The type species is Robertannia sorbiniorum.	
Scheenstia	Gen. et sp.	Valid	López-Arbarello; Sferco	Late Jurassic		Germany	A semionotiform.	
Sharfia	Gen. et sp.	Valid	Pietsch; Carnevale	Eocene (late Ypresian)	Monte Bolca locality	Italy	A goosefish. The type species is Sharfia mirabilis.	
Sinosaurichthys	Gen. et 3 sp.	Valid	Wu; Sun; et al. (Note: Wu, Sun, Xu, Hao, Jiang, Sun.)	Anisian	Guanling Formation	China	A saurichthyid.	
Sorbinichthys africanus	Species	Valid	Murray; Wilson	Cenomanian or Turonian	Akrabou Formation	Morocco	A species of Sorbinichthys.	
"genus Sparidarum" spatiatus	Sp. nov	Valid	Schwarzhans; Bratishko	Paleocene (Selandian)		Ukraine	A member of Sparidae of uncertain generic assignment.	
Spinofacia	Gen. et sp.	Valid	Mickle	Carboniferous	Manning Canyon Shale Formation	USA	A ’palaeoniscoid’.	
Steurbautichthys	Gen. et comb. nov	Valid	Taverne	Middle Jurassic (Aalenian to Bathonian)	Stanleyville Formation, Songa Limestones	Democratic Republic of the Congo	A relative of Ankylophorus; a new genus for "Pholidophorus" aequatorialis de Saint-Seine & Casier (1962).	
Tarkus	Gen. et sp. nov	Valid	Carnevale; Pietsch	Eocene (late Ypresian)	Monte Bolca locality	Italy	A member of Ogcocephalidae. The type species is Tarkus squirei.	
