= List of indeterminate prehistoric percomorph genera =

In the past, many fossil fish genera from the Late Cretaceous onwards were placed in the order Perciformes or the suborder Percoidei. Recent taxonomic revisions have found the former interpretation of Perciformes and Percoidei to be paraphyletic, comprising many distantly related families from across the Percomorpha, and these studies have thus significantly restricted the new definition of Perciformes. As these revisions were based primarily on genetic data, the taxonomic affiliation of many of these fossil "perciforms" is now uncertain beyond them belonging to the Percomorpha. This list contains fossil genera that are either considered indeterminate percomorphs or were previously assigned to the sensu lato interpretation of Perciformes/Percoidei:

== Taxonomy ==
=== Families ===
- Family Asianthidae Sytchevskaya & Prokofiev, 2003 (earliest Eocene of Turkmenistan; disputed)
  - Asianthus Sytchevskaya & Prokofiev, 2003
  - Eosasia Sytchevskaya & Prokofiev, 2003
  - Pauranthus Sytchevskaya & Prokofiev, 2003
- Family Callipterygidae (early Eocene of Italy) (possibly a perciform)
  - Callipteryx Agassiz, 1838
- Family Caucasichthyidae Bannikov, 2011 (middle Eocene of North Caucasus, Russia)
  - Caucasichthys Bannikov, 2011
- Family Eocottidae (early Eocene of Italy) (possibly a perciform)
  - Bassanichthys Bannikov, 2004
  - Eocottus Woodward, 1901
- Family Exelliidae
  - Eoluvarus Sahni & Choudhary, 1977 (Early Eocene of India)
  - Exellia White & Moy-Thomas, 1941 (Early Eocene of Italy & Turkmenistan)
- Family †Pietschellidae Carnevale & Bannikov, 2015 (Early Eocene of Italy)
  - Pietschellus Carnevale & Bannikov, 2015
  - Nickcaves Carnevale & Bannikov, 2015
- Family Priscacaridae
  - Priscacara Cope, 1877 (Early Eocene of Wyoming, USA) (possibly a cichliform)
- Family Quasimullidae (early Eocene of Italy)
  - Quasimullus Bannikov, 1999
- Family Repropcidae Bannikov, 1991
  - Apscheronichthys Prokofiev, 2001 (Oligocene of North Caucasus, Russia)
  - Quasirepropca Prokofiev, 2009
  - Repropca Bannikov, 1991 (Early Oligocene of Poland & North Caucasus, Russia)
- Family Robertanniidae (early Eocene of Italy) (possibly a perciform)
  - Robertannia Bannikov, 2011
  - Hendrixella Bannikov & Carnevale, 2009
- Tortonesiidae (Early Eocene of Italy) (possibly a labriform)
  - Guus Bannikov, 2019
  - Tortonesia Sorbini, 1983
- Salwaichthyidae Bannikov, 2020
  - Salwaichthys Bannikov, 2020 (Early Oligocene of North Caucasus (Russia), Abkhazia, and Poland)

=== Genera ===
- Acronuroides Bannikov, Carnevale & Tyler, 2019 (Early Eocene of Italy)
- Aluvarus Bannikov & Tyler, 1995 (Late Eocene of Iran; possibly a luvarid)
- Ammutichthys Calzoni, Giusberti & Carnevale, 2025 (Early Eocene of Italy)
- Amphiperca Weitzel, 1933 (Middle Eocene of Germany)
- Anthracoperca Voigt, 1934 (Middle Eocene of Germany, possible earlier records from France & India)
- Blabe White, 1936 (Middle Eocene of Egypt)
- Blotichthys Sorbini, 1984 (Early Eocene of Italy)
- Bolcaperca Bannikov & Zorzin, 2023 (Early Eocene of Italy)
- Bradyurus Gill, 1904 (Early Eocene of Italy)
- Carpathoserranoides Prokofiev, 2009 (Early Oligocene of Poland & the Czech Republic)
- Caucasoserranoides Prokofiev, 2009 (Oligocene of North Caucasus, Russia)
- Cristigerina Leriche, 1905 (Early Eocene of Belgium)
- Cyclopoma Agassiz, 1833 (early Eocene of Italy and the United States; possibly a centropomid or a percichthyid)
- Dibango Davesne & Carnevale, 2025 (Early Eocene of Italy)
- Eoserranus Woodward, 1908 (Late Cretaceous of India)
- Epibatichthys Prokofiev, 2002 (Late Oligocene/Early Miocene of North Caucasus, Russia)
- Erebusia Calzoni, Giusberti & Carnevale, 2025 (Early Eocene of Italy)
- Frigoichthys Bannikov, 2004 (Early Eocene of Italy)
- Frippia Bannikov & Carnevale, 2012 (Early Eocene of Italy)
- Gillidia Eastman, 1914 (Early Eocene of Italy)
- Indiaichthys Arratia, 2004 (Early Eocene of India)
- Latellopsis Bannikov & Zorzin, 2019 (Early Eocene of Italy)
- Mioplosus Cope, 1877 (Early Eocene of Wyoming, USA)
- Jimtylerius Bannikov & Carnevale, 2007 (Early Eocene of Italy)
- Johnsonperca Taverne, 2010 (Late Cretaceous of Italy)
- Malacopygaeus Leriche, 1906 (Early Eocene of Italy)
- Montepostalia Bannikov & Zorzin, 2004 (Early Eocene of Italy)
- Nardoichthys Sorbini & Bannikov, 1991 (Late Cretaceous of Italy)
- Kelemejtubus Cantalice & Alvardo-Ortega, 2017 (Early Paleocene of Mexico)
- Oligoserranoides Prokofiev, 2009 (Early Oligocene of Poland)
- Palaeoperca Micklich, 1978 (Middle Eocene of Germany)
- Parapelates Bannikov, 2008 (Early Eocene of Italy)
- Parapercichthys Greenwood, 1983 (Paleocene of Saudi Arabia)
- Parapygaeus Pellegrin, 1907 (Early Eocene of Italy)
- Pavarottia Bannikov & Zorzin, 2011 (Early Eocene of Italy)
- Pirsagatia Prokofiev, 2002 (Late Oligocene/Early Miocene of North Caucasus, Russia)
- Portentosoceros Nazarkin & Bannikov, 2021 (Middle Miocene of Sakhalin, Russia) (possibly a pentacerotid)
- Pygaeus Agassiz, 1835 (early Eocene of Italy) (possibly a carangiform)
- Prolates Priem, 1899 (Late Cretaceous of France)
- Properca Sauvage, 1880 (Paleocene to Early Miocene of Europe)
- Proserranus Patterson, 1964 (Early Paleocene of Sweden)
- Quasicichla Bannikov, 2004 (Early Eocene of Italy)
- Rhenanoperca Gaudant & Micklich, 1990 (Middle Eocene of Germany)
- Saldenioichthys Lopez-Arbarello, Arratia & Tunik, 2003 (Late Cretaceous of Argentina)
- Semlikiichthys Otero & Gayet, 1999 (Early Miocene to Early Pleistocene of Egypt, Chad, Kenya & the Democratic Republic of the Congo)
- Squamibolcoides Bannikov & Zorzin, 2013 (Early Eocene of Italy)
- Stefanichthys Bannikov & Roberto, 2020 (Early Eocene of Italy)
- Ungarnia Prokofiev, 2009 (Oligocene of Romania)
- Veronabrax Bannikov, 2008 (Early Eocene of Italy)
- Vixperca Peña Zarzuelo, 1991 (Middle Eocene of Spain)
- Voltamulloides Bannikov, 2008 (Early Eocene of Italy)
- Weilerichthys Otero & Gayet, 1999 (Late Eocene of Egypt)
- Zorzinperca Taverne, 2010 (Late Cretaceous of Italy)

==== Otolith genera ====
- Paraplesiopoma Trif & Schwarzhans, 2025 (Late Cretaceous of Romania)
- Plesiopoma Schwarzhans, 2010 (Late Cretaceous to Early Eocene)
