= Bluejacket =

Bluejacket, or Blue Jacket may refer to:

== People ==
- Another term for naval rating, a junior enlisted sailor in a navy
- Blue Jacket (1745–1810), Shawnee war chief known for his defense of Shawnee lands in the Ohio Country
- Charles Blue Jacket (1817–1897), 19th-century Shawnee chief in Kansas, and Methodist Minister
- Jim Bluejacket (1887–1947), one of the first Native Americans to play in major league baseball
- Jimmy Smith (baseball, born 1895) (1895–1974), major league infielder often referred to as Bluejacket

== Geographic ==
- Bluejacket, Oklahoma, named for Charles Blue Jacket
- Blue Jacket Creek, a stream in Ohio named after Blue Jacket
- Blue Jacket's Crossing, an Oregon Trail crossing constructed by Charles Blue Jacket
- Blue Jacket's Town, a settlement founded by Blue Jacket in 1777

== Sailboats ==
- Bluejacket 23, a Canadian sailboat design
- Bluejacket MS 23, a Canadian motorsailer design

== Ships ==
- Blue Jacket (clipper), an 1854 clipper ship in the Liverpool and Australia trade
- USS Blue Jacket, the name of several U.S. Navy ships

== Other ==
- The Bluejacket's Manual, the basic handbook for U.S. Navy personnel
- The Bluejackets, a 1922 Dutch film
- Columbus Blue Jackets, a professional ice hockey team in the National Hockey League based in Columbus, Ohio
- Tradescantia ohiensis, a plant known by the common name "bluejacket"
