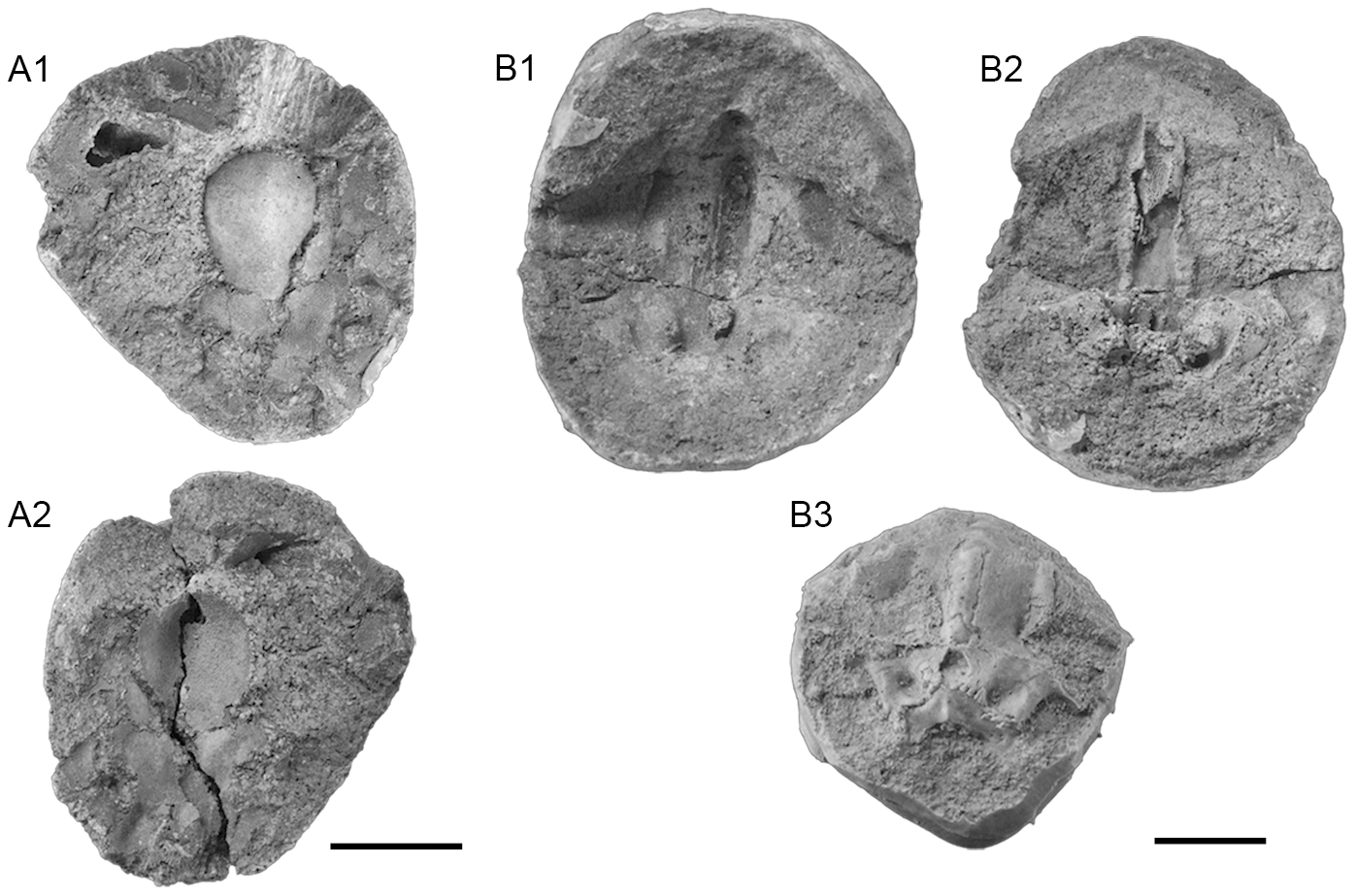
- Fossil elements of the holotype and paratype

Scientific classification
- Kingdom: Animalia
- Phylum: Chordata
- Class: Chondrichthyes
- Order: †Symmoriiformes
- Genus: †Kawichthys; Pradel et al., 2011
- Species: †K. moodiei

Binomial name
- †Kawichthys moodiei Pradel et al., 2011

= Kawichthys =

Kawichthys Temporal range: Pennsylvanian, 305–299 Ma

Extinct genus of cartilaginous fishes

Kawichthys was an extinct genus of symmoriiform cartilaginous fish from Upper Pennsylvanian (Late Virgilian stage) deposits of Kansas, United States. Kawichthys is known from two well preserved three-dimensional neurocrania: the holotype KUVP 152144 is associated with some disturbed and broken postcranial elements, but the braincase is partially crushed, and the paratype KUVP 56340. It was collected from the Douglas Group, between the Haskell Limestone and the lower beds of the overlying Robbins Shale, previously classified as members of the Lawrence Formation or Stranger Formation, but now recognized as members of the extension of the Cass Limestone classification into Kansas. It was first named by Alan Pradel, Paul Tafforeau, John G. Maisey and Philippe Janvier in 2011 and the type species is Kawichthys moodiei.
