= Spinofacia =

Scientific classification
- Domain: Eukaryota
- Kingdom: Animalia
- Phylum: Chordata
- Class: Actinopterygii
- Order: †Palaeonisciformes
- Family: †Palaeoniscidae
- Genus: †Spinofacia

Extinct genus of fishes

Spinofacia is an extinct genus of prehistoric bony fish that lived during the late Mississippian/early Pennsylvanian in what is now Utah, United States. Fossils were recovered from the Manning Canyon Shale.

== See also ==
- Prehistoric fish
- List of prehistoric bony fish
