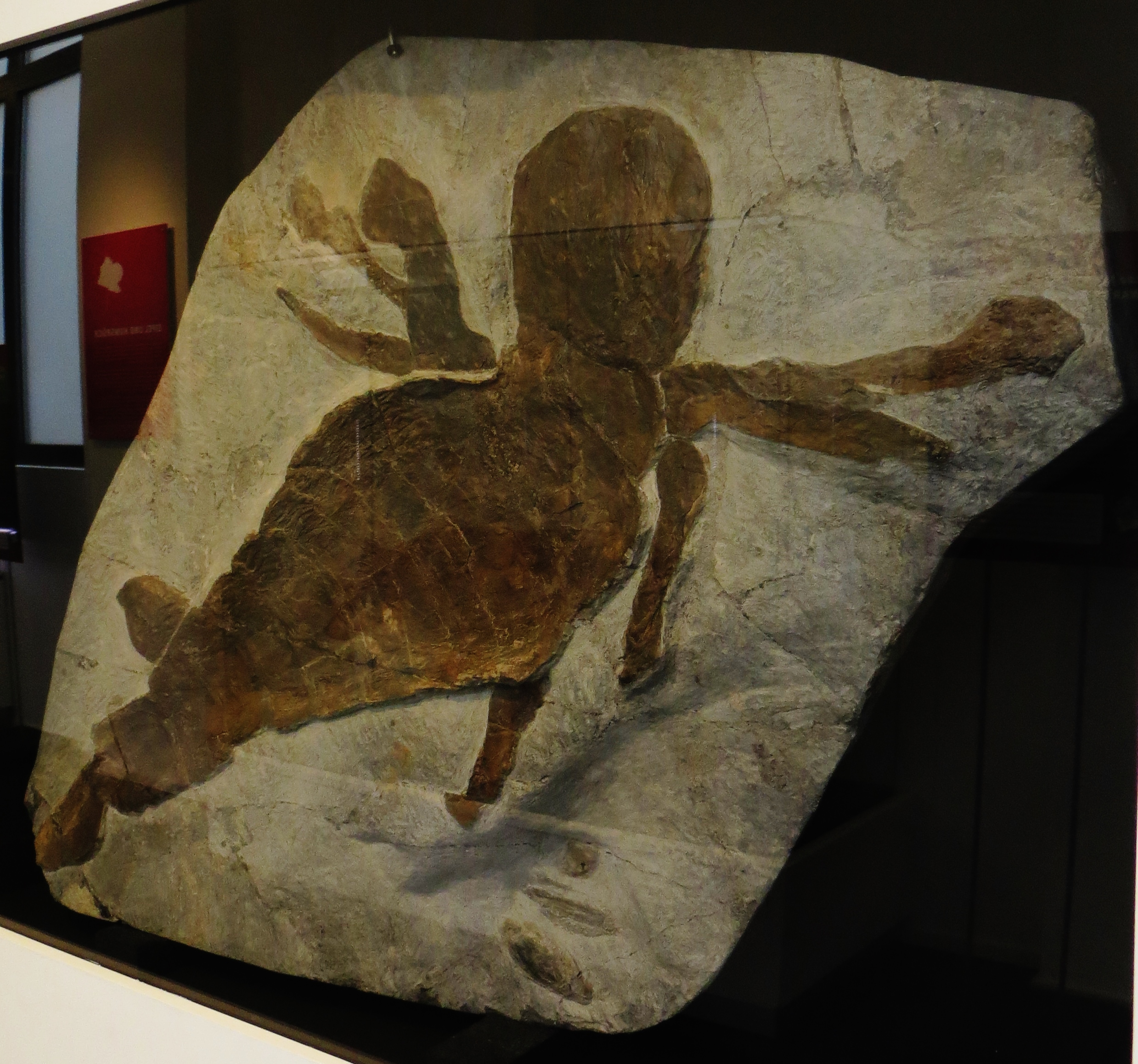
- Fossil of J. rhenaniae, Natural History Museum, Mainz

Scientific classification
- Kingdom: Animalia
- Phylum: Arthropoda
- Subphylum: Chelicerata
- Order: †Eurypterida
- Superfamily: †Pterygotioidea
- Family: †Pterygotidae
- Genus: †Jaekelopterus; Waterston, 1964

Type species
- †Jaekelopterus rhenaniae (Jaekel, 1914)

Species
- †J. howelli (Kjellesvig-Waering & Størmer, 1952); †J. marylandicus (Kjellesvig-Waering, 1964); †J. rhenaniae (Jaekel, 1914)

Synonyms
- Pterygotus howelli Kjellesvig-Waering & Størmer, 1952; Pterygotus marylandicus Kjellesvig-Waering, 1964; Pterygotus rhenaniae Jaekel, 1914

= Jaekelopterus =

Jaekelopterus Temporal range: Wenlock–Emsian

Extinct Devonian genus of Eurypterida

Jaekelopterus is an extinct genus of eurypterid, a group of extinct aquatic arthropods. Fossils of Jaekelopterus have been discovered in deposits of Middle Silurian to Early Devonian age, from the Wenlock epoch to Emsian stage. There are three known species: the type species J. rhenaniae from Devonian brackish to fresh water strata in the Rhineland, J. howelli from Devonian estuarine strata in Wyoming, and J. marylandicus from Silurian deposits in Maryland. The generic name combines the name of German paleontologist Otto Jaekel, who described the type species, and the Greek word πτερόν (pteron) meaning 'wing'.

Based on the isolated fossil remains of a large chelicera (claw) from the Klerf Formation of Germany, J. rhenaniae has been estimated to have reached a size of around 2.3–2.6 metres (7.5–8.5 ft), making it the largest arthropod ever discovered, surpassing other large arthropods such as fellow eurypterids Acutiramus and Pterygotus and the millipede Arthropleura. The much smaller J. howelli only reached 80 centimetres (2.6 ft) in length.

In overall appearance, Jaekelopterus is similar to other pterygotid eurypterids, possessing a large, expanded telson (the hindmost segment of the body) and enlarged pincers and forelimbs. Both species of Jaekelopterus were first described as species of the closely related Pterygotus but were raised as a separate genus based on an observed difference in the genital appendage. Though this feature has since proved to be a misidentification, other features distinguishing the genus from its relatives have been identified, including a telson with a triangular shape and a different inclination of the denticles of the claws.

The chelicerae and compound eyes of Jaekelopterus indicate it was active and powerful with high visual acuity, most likely an apex predator in the ecosystems of Early Devonian Euramerica. Although eurypterids such as Jaekelopterus are often called "sea scorpions", the strata in which Jaekelopterus fossils have been found suggest that it lived in fresh water environments.

== Description ==
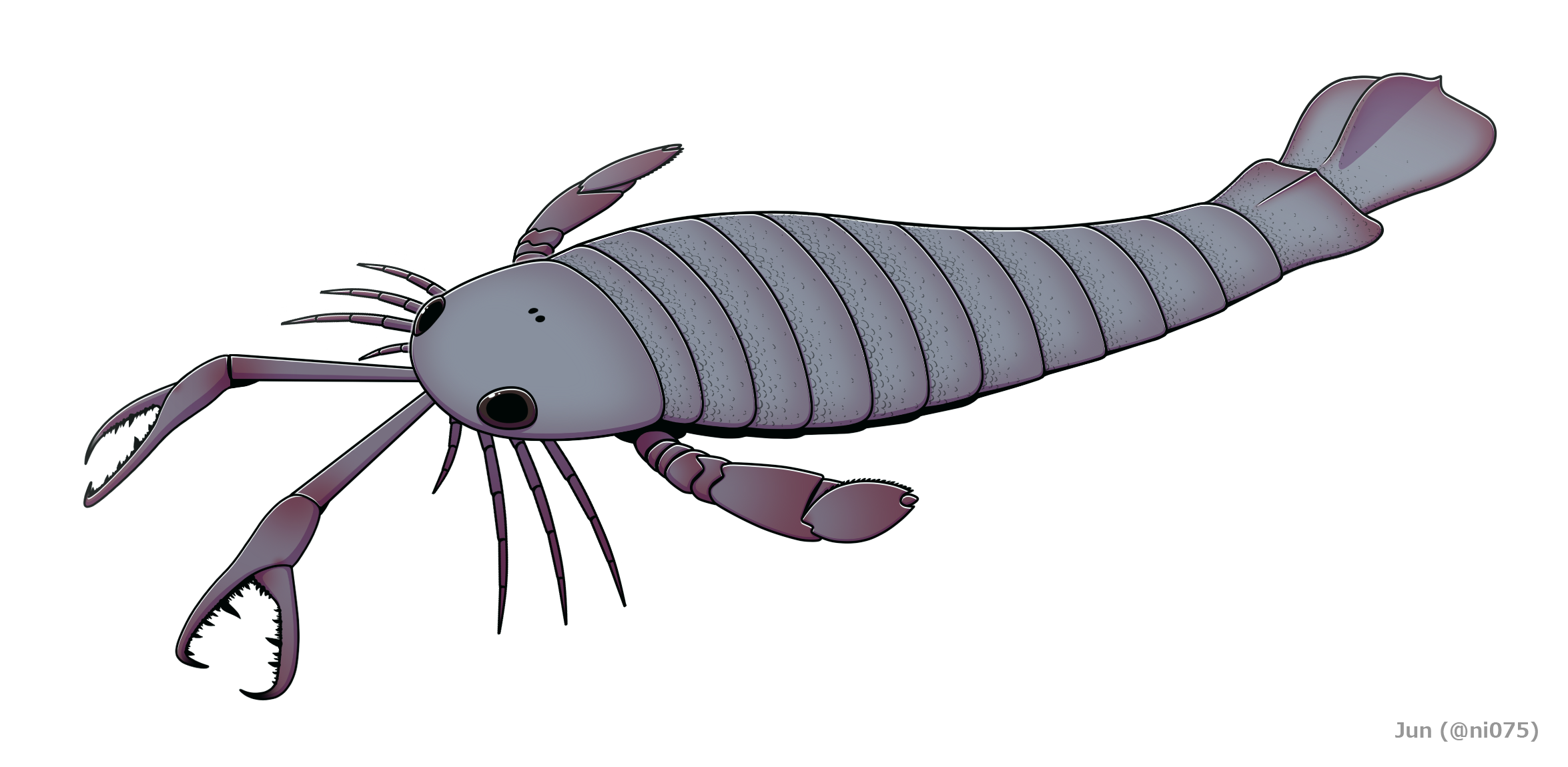
Restoration of J. rhenaniae

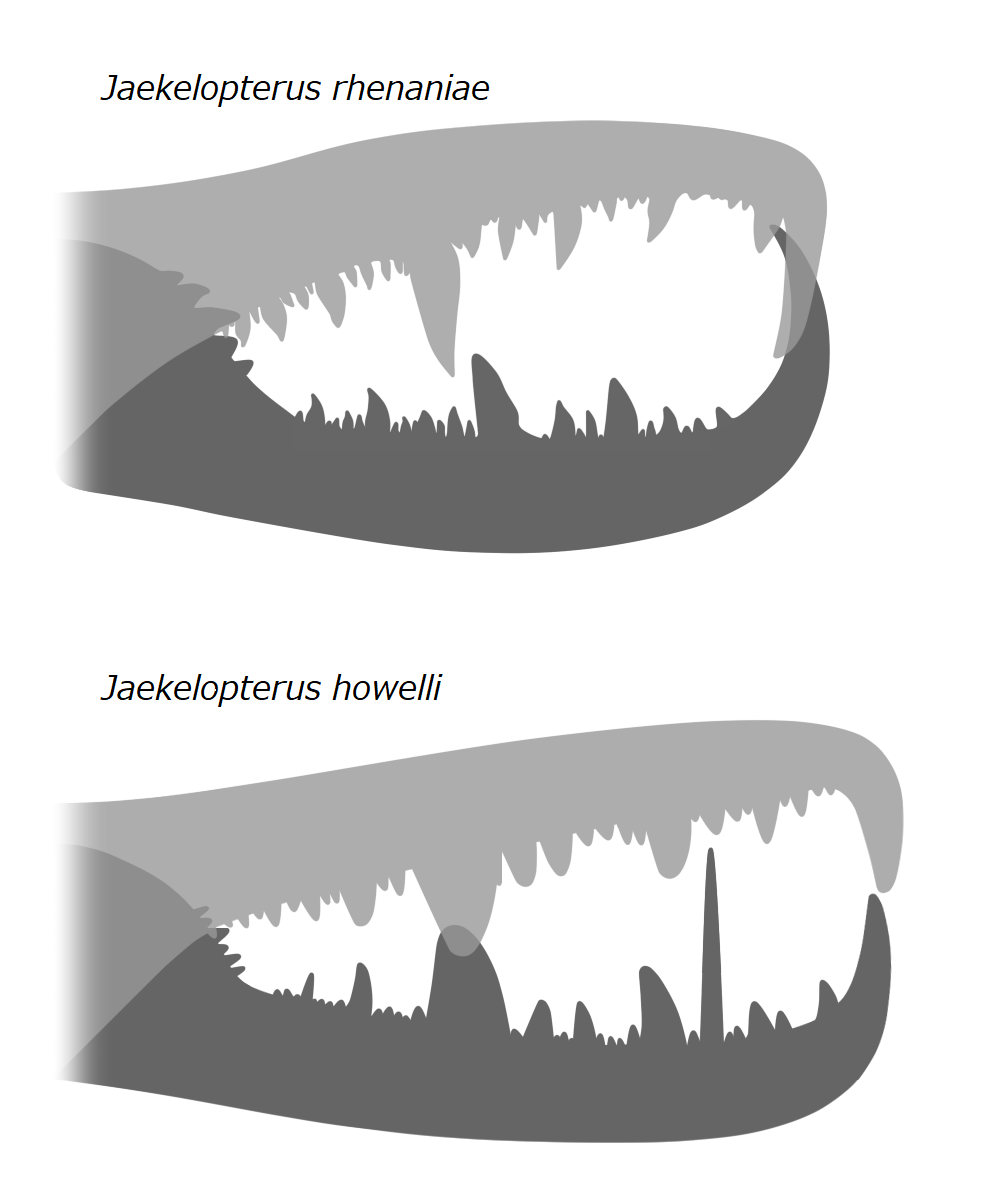
Cheliceral rami of two species of Jaekelopterus

Jaekelopterus is the largest known eurypterid and the largest known arthropod to have ever existed. This was determined based on a chelicera (claw) from the Emsian Klerf Formation of Willwerath, Germany, that measures 36.4 centimetres (14.3 in) long, but is missing a quarter of its length, suggesting that the full chelicera would have been 45.5 centimetres (17.9 in) long. If the ratio of body length to chelicera length matches those of other giant pterygotids, such as Acutiramus and Pterygotus, where the ratio between claw size and body length is relatively consistent, the organism that possessed the chelicera would have measured between 233 and 259 centimetres (7.64 and 8.50 feet) in length. With the chelicerae extended, another metre (3.3 feet) would be added to this length. This estimate exceeds the maximum body size of all other known giant arthropods by almost half a metre (1.6 feet) even if the extended chelicerae are not included.

Jaekelopterus is similar to other pterygotid eurypterids in its overall morphology, distinguished by its triangular telson (the hindmost segment of its body) and inclined principal denticles on its cheliceral rami (the moving part of the claws). The pterygotids, a group of highly derived ("advanced") eurypterids, differ from other groups in several features, especially in the chelicerae and the telson. The chelicerae of the Pterygotidae are enlarged and robust, clearly adapted for active prey capture, with chelae (pincers) more similar to the claws of some modern crustaceans, with well-developed teeth on the claws, relative to the chelicerae of other eurypterid groups. Another feature distinguishing the group from other eurypterid groups is their flattened and expanded telsons, likely used as rudders when swimming.

J. howelli, known from over 30 specimens, has an almost identical pattern of denticulation on the chelicerae as J. rhenaniae and also preserves a flattened posterior margin of the telson, which results in a triangular shape, as in J. rhenaniae. Its serrated telson margin and the massive elongation of the second intermediate denticle clearly distinguishes it from J. rhenaniae. Furthermore, the type A genital appendage is not bifurcated at its end. J. howelli is much smaller than J. rhenaniae, reaching 80 centimetres (2.6 ft) in length.

== History of research ==
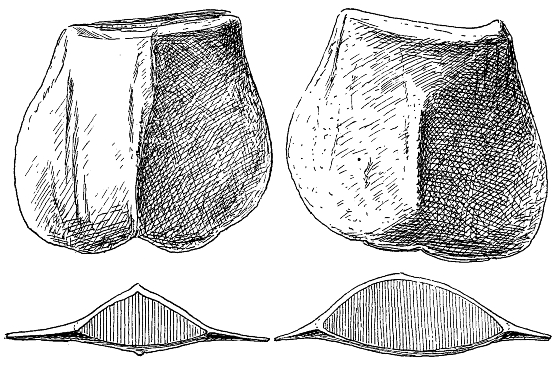
Illustration of the holotype specimen of "Pterygotus rhenaniae", a pretelson, by Otto Jaekel, 1914

Jaekelopterus was originally described as a species of Pterygotus, P. rhenaniae, in 1914 by German palaeontologist Otto Jaekel based on an isolated fossil pretelson (the segment directly preceding the telson) he received that had been discovered at Alken in Lower Devonian deposits of the Rhineland in Germany. Jaekel considered the pretelson to be characteristic of Pterygotus, other discovered elements differing little from previously known species of that genus, such as P. buffaloensis, and he estimated the length of the animal in life to be about 1 metre (3.3 feet), or 1.5 metres (4.9 feet) if the chelicerae are included.

Based on more comprehensive material, including genital appendages, chelicerae and fragments of the metastoma (a large plate that is part of the abdomen) and telson discovered by German palaeontologist Walter R. Gross near Overath, Germany, Norwegian palaeontologist Leif Størmer provided a more comprehensive and detailed description of the species in 1936. Størmer interpreted the genital appendages as being segmented, distinct from other species of Pterygotus.

British palaeontologist Charles D. Waterston erected the genus Jaekelopterus in 1964 to accommodate Pterygotus rhenaniae, which he considered sufficiently distinct from other species of Pterygotus to warrant its own genus, primarily due to the abdominal appendages of Jaekelopterus being segmented as opposed to those of Pterygotus. Waterston diagnosed Jaekelopterus as a pterygotid with segmented genital appendages, a trapezoid prosoma, narrow and long chelicerae with terminal teeth almost at right angles to the rami and the primary teeth slightly angled anteriorly and with a telson with an expanded terminal spine and dorsal keel. The generic name honours Otto Jaekel; the Greek word πτερόν (pteron), meaning "wing", is a common epithet in eurypterid names.

In 1974, Størmer erected a new family to house the genus, Jaekelopteridae, due to the supposed considerable differences between the genital appendage of Jaekelopterus and other pterygotids. This diverging feature has since been proven to simply represent a misinterpretation by Størmer in 1936, the genital appendage of Jaekelopterus in fact being unsegmented like that of Pterygotus. As such, the family Jaekelopteridae has subsequently been rejected and treated as synonymous with the family Pterygotidae.

Another species of Pterygotus, P. howelli, was named by American palaeontologist Erik Kjellesvig-Waering and Størmer in 1952 based on a fossil telson and tergite (the dorsal part of a body segment) from Lower Devonian deposits of the Beartooth Butte Formation in Wyoming. The species name howelli honours Dr. Benjamin Howell of Princeton University, who loaned the fossil specimens examined in the description to Kjellesvig-Waering and Størmer. This species was assigned to Jaekelopterus as Jaekelopterus howelli by Norwegian palaeontologist O. Erik Tetlie in 2007.

Yet another species of Pterygotus, P. marylandicus, was named by Kjellesvig-Waering in 1964, based on a fragmentary and small telson from the Silurian McKenzie Formation, Maryland. The specimen (No. 140901 at the United States National Museum) is very wide, 0.75 cm, and has a nearly straight base with the margins converging anteriorly. There are no serrations on the telson and the spine is blunt. In shape, the telson is similar to J. howelli from the Early Devonian, being wide and truncated, but is easily distinguished by possessing serrations and a much larger terminal spine. P. marylandicus was transferred to Jaekelopterus by James Lamsdell in 2025, noting that the broad and flat posterior margin and clearly triangular outlien of the telson was characteristic of Jaekelopterus and unknown in all other pterygotids. This reclassification made J. marylandicus the oldest known species of Jaekelopterus.

== Classification ==
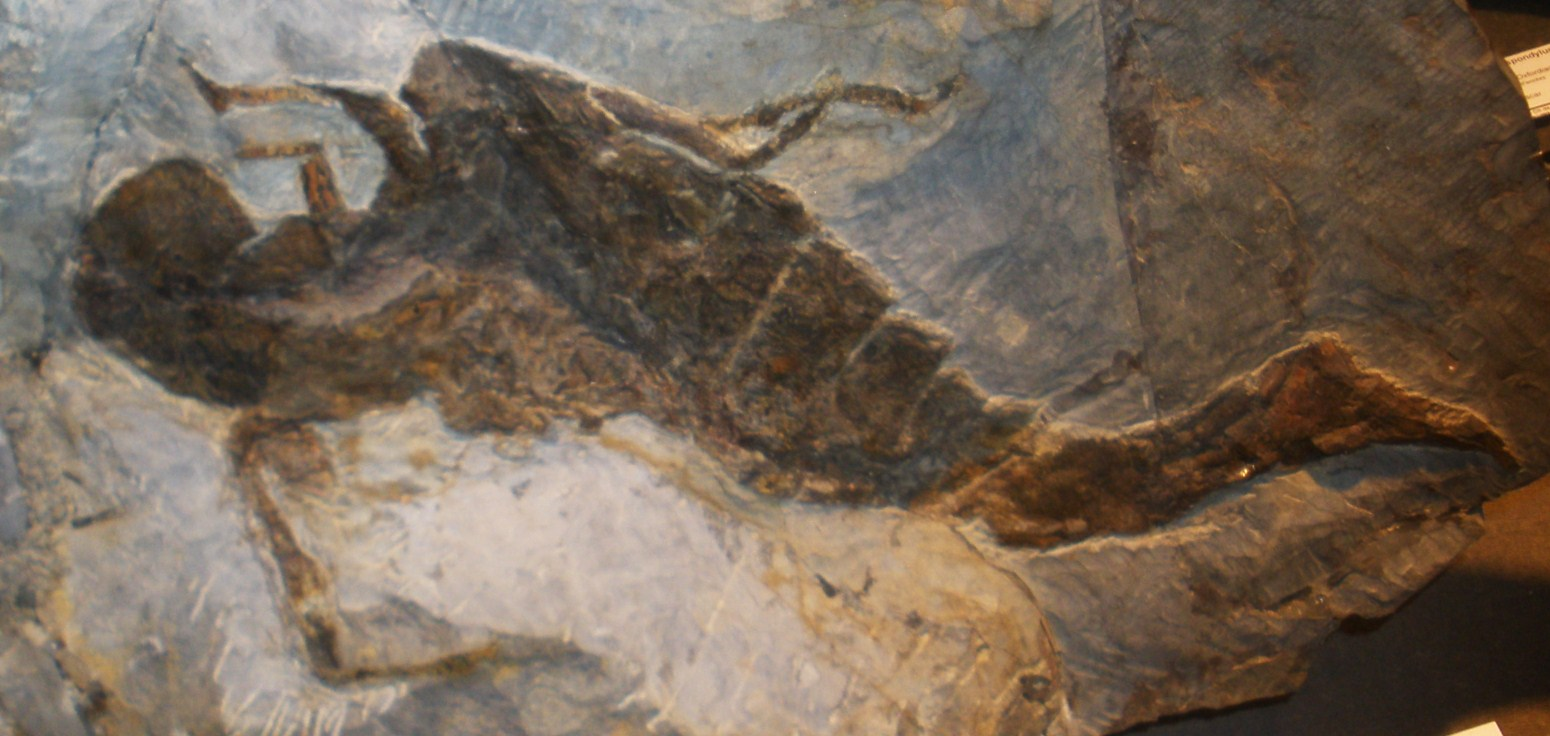
Fossil of J. rhenaniae at the Mineralientage München

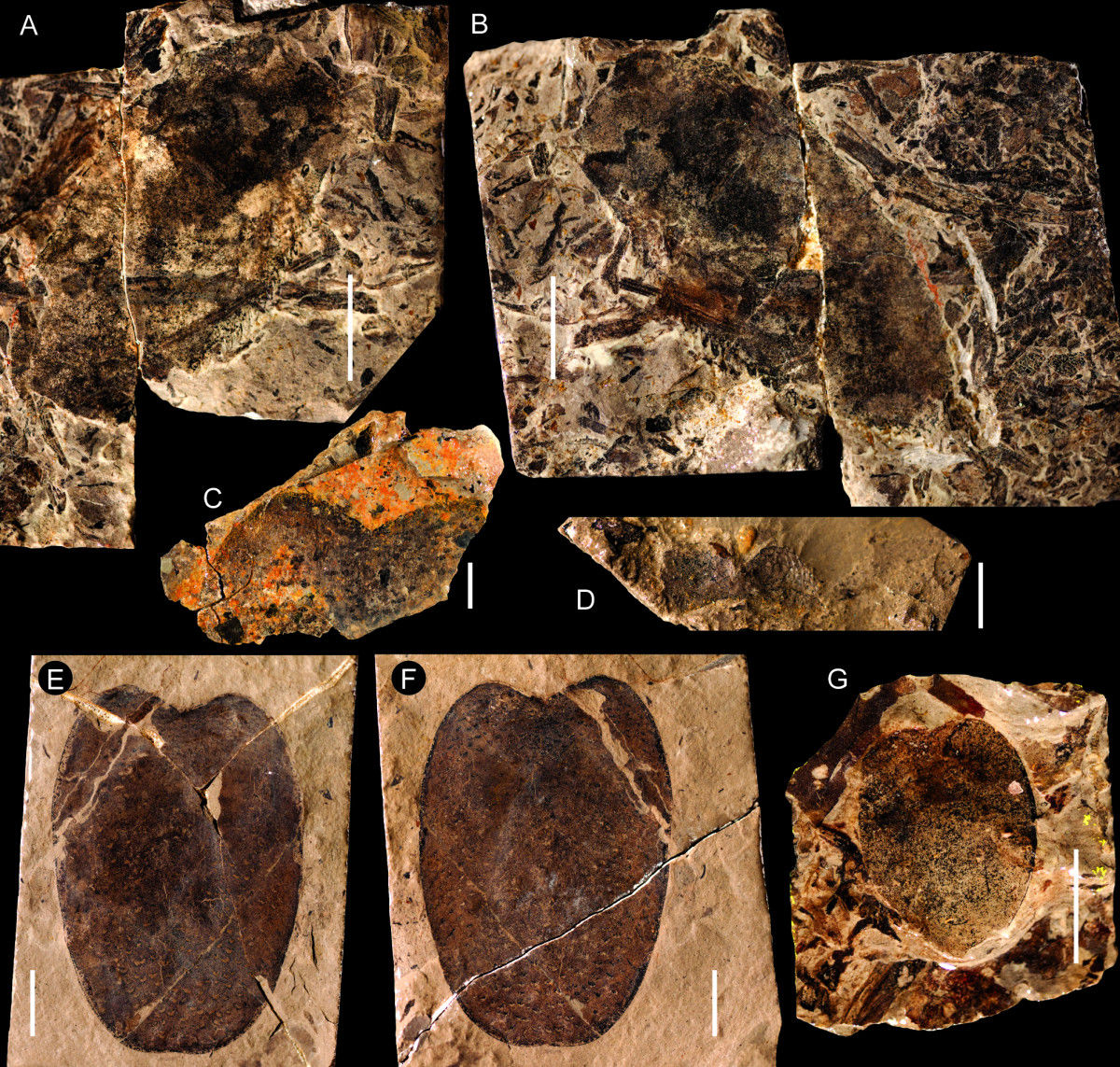
Fossil paddle (A–B) and metastoma (C–G) of J. howelli

Jaekelopterus is classified within the family Pterygotidae in the superfamily Pterygotioidea. Jaekelopterus is similar to Pterygotus, virtually only distinct in features of its genital appendage and potentially its telson. The close similarities between the two genera have prompted some researchers to question if the pterygotids are oversplit on the generic level. Based on some similarities in the genital appendage, American palaeontologists James C. Lamsdell and David A. Legg suggested in 2010 that Jaekelopterus, Pterygotus and even Acutiramus could be synonyms of each other. Though differences have been noted in chelicerae, these structures were questioned as the basis of generic distinctions in eurypterids by Charles D. Waterston in 1964 since their morphology is dependent on lifestyle and varies throughout ontogeny (the development of the organism following its birth). Whilst telson morphology can be used to distinguish genera in eurypterids, Lamsdell and Legg noted that the triangular telson of Jaekelopterus might still fall within the morphological range of the paddle-shaped telsons present in Pterygotus and Acutiramus. Genital appendages can vary even within genera; for instance, the genital appendage of Acutiramus changes from species to species, being spoon-shaped in earlier species and then becoming bilobed and eventually beginning to look similar to the appendage of Jaekelopterus. Lamsdell and Legg concluded that an inclusive phylogenetic analysis with multiple species of Acutiramus, Pterygotus and Jaekelopterus is required to resolve whether the genera are synonyms of each other.

The cladogram below is based on the nine best-known pterygotid species and two outgroup taxa (Slimonia acuminata and Hughmilleria socialis). Jaekelopterus had previously been classified as a basal sister taxon to the rest of the Pterygotidae since its description as a separate genus by Waterston in 1964 due to its supposedly segmented genital appendages (fused and undivided in other pterygotids), but restudy of the specimens in question revealed that the genital appendage of Jaekelopterus also was undivided. The material examined and phylogenetic analysis conducted by British palaeontologist Simon J. Braddy, German palaeontologist Markus Poschmann and O. Erik Tetlie in 2007 revealed that Jaekelopterus was not a basal pterygotid, but one of the most derived taxa in the group. The cladogram also contains the maximum sizes reached by the species in question, which was suggested to possibly have been an evolutionary trait of the group per Cope's rule ("phyletic gigantism") by Braddy, Poschmann and Tetlie.

- Pterygotioidea
  - Hughmilleria socialis (20 cm, 7.9 in)
  - - Slimonia acuminata (100 cm, 3.3 ft)
    - - Pterygotidae
        - Ciurcopterus ventricosus (70 cm, 2.3 ft)
        - - - Erettopterus waylandsmithi (60 cm, 1.97 ft)
            - Erettopterus osiliensis (90 cm, 2.95 ft)
            - - Erettopterus serricaudatus (60 cm, 1.97 ft)
              - Erettopterus bilobus (70 cm, 2.3 ft)
          - - Pterygotus anglicus (160 cm, 5.2 ft)
            - - Jaekelopterus rhenaniae (250 cm, 8.2 ft)
              - - Acutiramus macrophthalmus (200 cm, 6.6 ft)
                - Acutiramus bohemicus (210 cm, 6.9 ft)

== Palaeobiology ==
=== Gigantism ===
The size of J. rhenaniae (larger) and J. howelli (smaller) compared to a human

The pterygotid eurypterids include many of the largest known eurypterids, such as Pterygotus and Acutiramus. Several factors have been suggested that might have contributed to the unprecedented large size of Jaekelopterus, its relatives and other large Paleozoic invertebrates, such as predation, courtship behaviour, competition and environmental resources.

Factors such as respiration, the energy costs of moulting, locomotion and the actual properties of the exoskeleton restrict the size of arthropods. Other than the robust and heavily sclerotised claws, most of the preserved large body segments of the pterygotids are thin and unmineralised. Even tergites and sternites (the plates that form the surfaces of the abdominal segments) are generally preserved as paper-thin compressions, suggesting that pterygotids were very lightweight in construction. Similar lightweight adaptations can be observed in other Paleozoic giant arthropods, such as the giant millipede-like Arthropleura, and it has been suggested to be vital for the evolution of giant arthropod sizes. A lightweight build decreases the influence of factors that restrict body size.

Despite being the largest arthropods, the lightweight build of Jaekelopterus and other giant pterygotid eurypterids meant they likely were not the heaviest. Other giant eurypterids, particularly the deep-bodied walking forms in the Hibbertopteridae, such as the almost 2-metre-long (6.6-foot) Hibbertopterus, may have rivalled the pterygotids and other giant arthropods in weight, if not surpassed them.

American palaeontologist Alexander Kaiser and South African palaeontologist Jaco Klok suggested in 2008 that the massive size estimates for Jaekelopterus are exaggerated, noting that the size estimates assume that the relative proportions between the chelicerae and body length would stay the same as the animal matured. The denticles (the serrations of the claws) were observed as showing positive allometry (being proportionally larger in larger specimens), which Kaiser and Klok suggest could have occurred in the chelicerae as a whole. Furthermore, the largest coxae (limb segments) found of the same species, measuring 27 centimetres (11 in) wide, suggest a total maximum body length of only 180 centimetres (5.9 ft). Positive allometry has not been demonstrated in eurypterid chelicerae as a whole in any other eurypterid genus, including in the closest relatives of Jaekelopterus. There are also some undescribed specimens of J. rhenaniae similar in proportions to the large chelicera, including another claw found in the same strata as the original find. In the opinion of Braddy, Poschmann and Tetlie, who replied to Kaiser and Klok the same year, the size estimates around 2.5 metres (8.2 ft) remain the most accurate estimates on the maximum size of the species yet.

=== Ontogeny ===
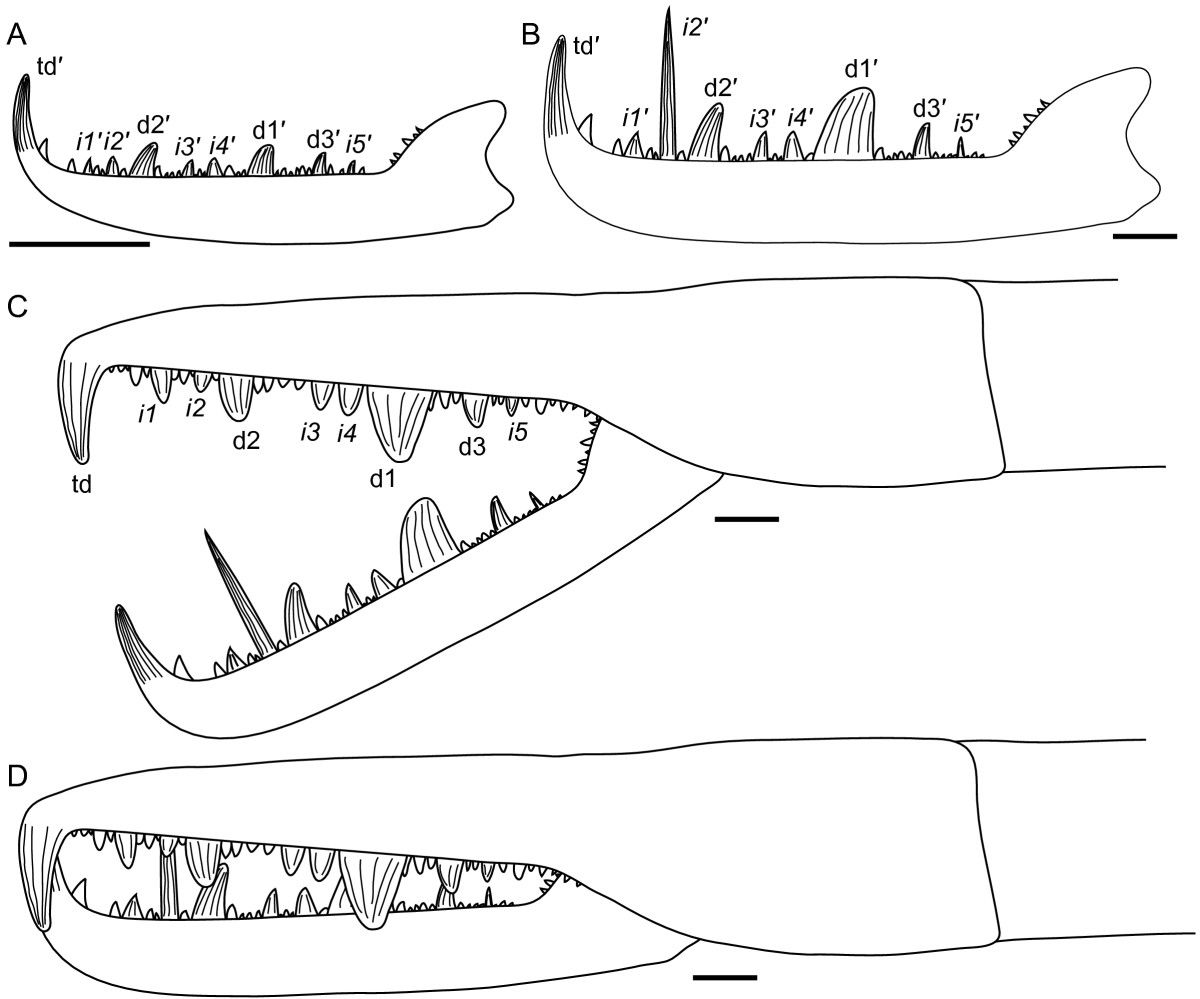
Chelicerae of J. howelli. A is a juvenile free ramus, B is an adult free ramus and C–D are articulated and fixed free rami from adults.

Like all other arthropods, eurypterids matured through a sequence of stages called "instars" consisting of periods of ecdysis (moulting) followed by rapid growth. Unlike many arthropods, such as insects and crustaceans, chelicerates (the group to which eurypterids like Jaekelopterus belongs, alongside other organisms such as horseshoe crabs, sea spiders and arachnids) are generally direct developers, meaning that there are no extreme morphological changes after they have hatched. Extant xiphosurans hatch without the full complement of adult opisthosomal appendages (appendages attached to the opisthosoma, the posterior segments of the body), but extant spiders are fully direct developers. Studies of fossil specimens of Strobilopterus and Jaekelopterus suggest that the ontogeny of eurypterids broadly parallelled that of modern horseshoe crabs, but that eurypterids (like arachnids) were true direct developers, hatching with the same number of appendages and segments as adults.

Though several fossilised instars of Jaekelopterus howelli are known, the fragmentary and incomplete status of the specimens makes it difficult to study its ontogeny in detail. Despite this, there are some noticeable changes occurring in the chelicerae, telson and metastoma. Four of the J. howelli specimens studied by Lamsdell and Selden (2013) preserve the chelicerae in enough detail to allow for study of the denticles. Two of these chelicerae were assumed to come from juveniles and two were assumed to be from adults. The morphology of the chelicerae is similar across all ages, with the same arrangement and number of denticles, but there were also some noticeable differences. Particularly, the principal denticles grew in size relative to the intermediate denticles, being 1.5 times the size of the intermediate denticles in juveniles, but up to 3.5 times the size of the intermediate denticles in adults. Furthermore, the terminal denticle was far larger and more robust in adult specimens than in juveniles. Perhaps most extreme of all, the second intermediate denticle is not different in size from the other intermediate denticles in juveniles, but it is massively elongated in adults, where it is more than twice the length of any principal denticle. Though such growth in the denticles of pterygotids has been described in other genera, the massive elongation of the second intermediate denticle through ontogeny is unique to Jaekelopterus, particularly to J. howelli.

The metastoma of Jaekelopterus also altered its dimensions as the animal matured. In J. rhenaniae, the relative width of the metastoma decreased through ontogeny. The metastoma in J. howelli is also broader in juveniles than in adults, although the length–width ratios measured in juveniles and adults were not as disparate as assumed, being 1.43 in juveniles and 1.46 in adults. Such a change in metastomal dimensions has been noted in other eurypterid genera as well, such as Stoermeropterus, Moselopterus and Strobilopterus.

=== Visual system ===
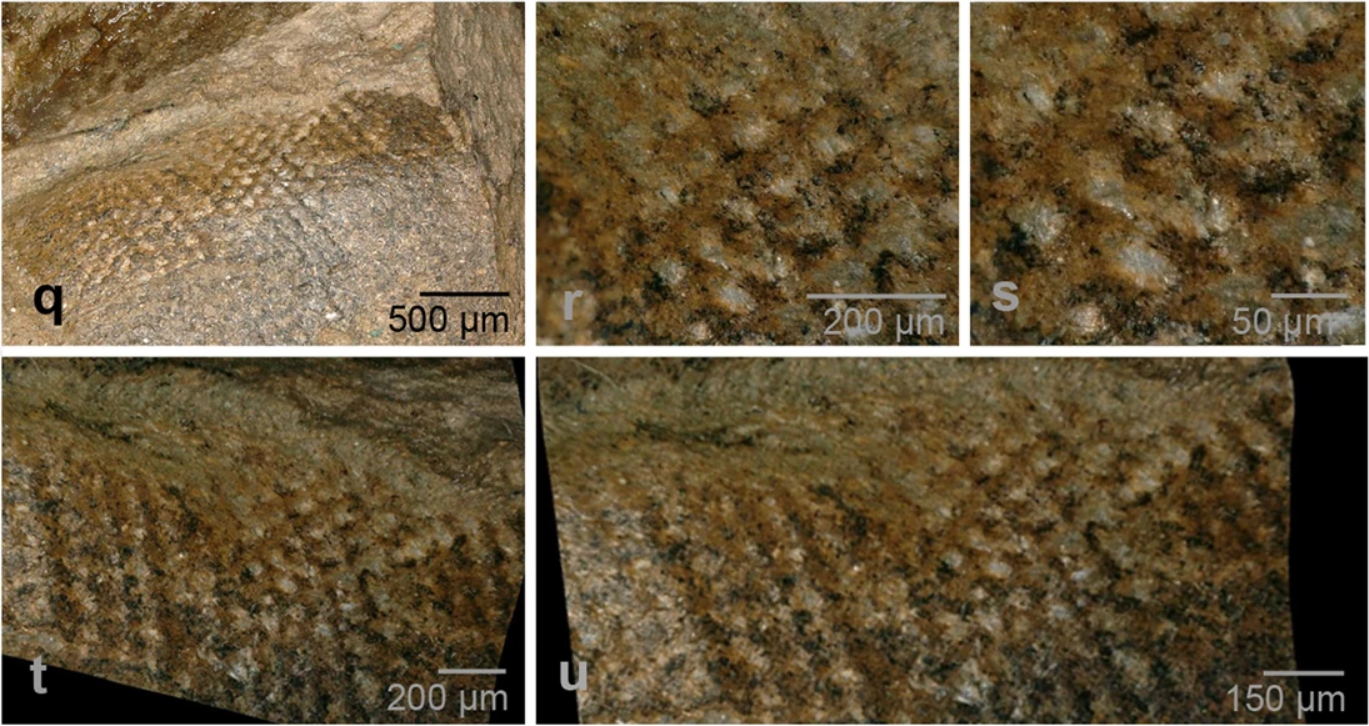
Fossilised exocones (the cone-shaped lens-cylinders which make up the compound eye) of J. rhenaniae.

The cheliceral morphology and visual acuity of the pterygotid eurypterids separates them into distinct ecological groups. The primary method for determining visual acuity in arthropods is by determining the number of lenses in their compound eyes and the interommatidial angle (IOA), which is the angle between the optical axes of adjacent lenses. The IOA is especially important as it can be used to distinguish different ecological roles in arthropods, being low in modern active arthropod predators.

Both Jaekelopterus rhenaniae and Pterygotus anglicus had high visual acuity, as suggested by the low IOA and many lenses in their compound eyes. Further studies on the compound eyes of fossilised specimens of J. rhenaniae, including a large specimen with the right eye preserved from the uppermost Siegenian and a small and likely juvenile specimen, confirmed the high visual acuity of the genus. The overall average IOA of Jaekelopterus (0.87°) is comparable to that of modern predatory arthropods. The visual acuity of Jaekelopterus increased with age, the smaller specimens having relatively worse eyesight. This is consistent with other pterygotids, such as Acutiramus, and has been interpreted as indicating that adult Jaekelopterus lived in darker environments, such as in deeper water. Trace fossil evidence of eurypterids also supports such a conclusion, indicating that eurypterids migrated to near-shore environments to mate and spawn.

Jaekelopterus had a frontally overlapping visual field, i.e. stereoscopic vision, typical of predatory animals. Structurally, eurypterid eyes were almost identical to the eyes of horseshoe crabs. The square-like pattern of the receptor cells in the compound eyes of Jaekelopterus is also similar, but not identical, to the pattern in horseshoe crabs, suggesting a specialised visual system. The photoreceptors are unusually large in Jaekelopterus. At around 70 μm, they are far larger than those of humans (1-2 μm) and most arthropods (also 1-2 μm) but they match those of modern horseshoe crabs in size.

The unique eyes of modern horseshoe crabs are highly distinct from eyes of other modern arthropods and allow increased edge-perception and enhance contrasts, important for animals in low and scattered light conditions. As the eyes of Jaekelopterus were very similar, it too likely had the same adaptations. With its highly specialised eyes, Jaekelopterus was very well adapted to its predatory lifestyle.

== Palaeoecology ==
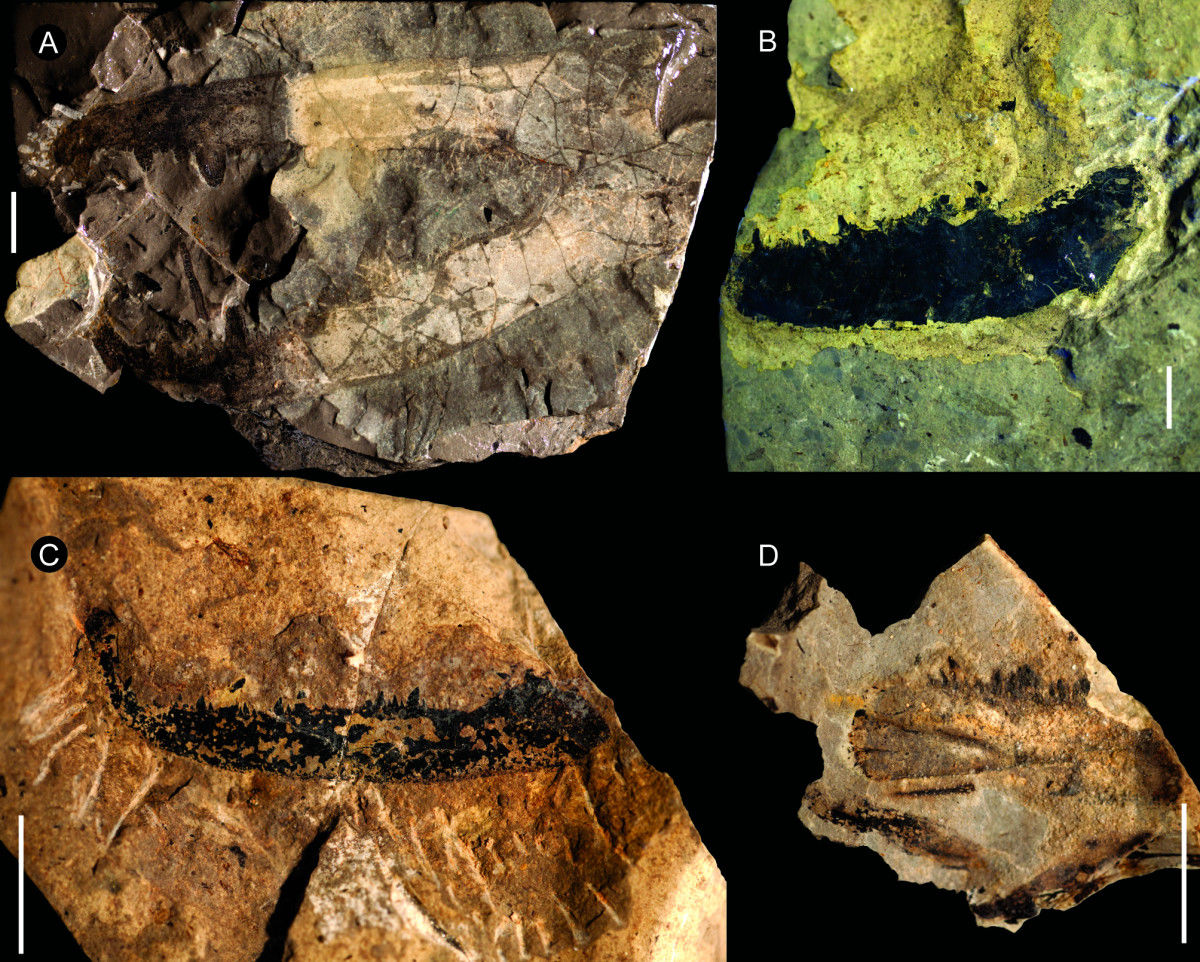
Fossil chelicerae of J. howelli.

The morphology and body construction of Jaekelopterus and other eurypterids in the Pterygotidae suggests they were adapted to a completely aquatic lifestyle. Braddy, Poschmann and Tetlie considered in a 2007 study that it was highly unlikely that an arthropod with the size and build of Jaekelopterus would be able to walk on land. Eurypterids such as Jaekelopterus are often popularly referred to as "sea scorpions", but the deposits from which Jaekelopterus fossils have been discovered suggest that it lived in non-marine aquatic environments. The Beartooth Butte Formation in Wyoming, where J. howelli fossils have been discovered, has been interpreted as a quiet, shallow estuarine environment. This species has been found together with two other eurypterid species: Dorfopterus angusticollis and Strobilopterus princetonii. The fossil sites yielding J. rhenaniae in the Rhineland have also been interpreted as having been part of a shallow aquatic environment with brackish to fresh water.

The chelicerae of Jaekelopterus are enlarged, robust and have a curved free ramus and denticles of different lengths and sizes, all adaptations that correspond to strong puncturing and grasping abilities in extant scorpions and crustaceans. Some puncture wounds on fossils of the poraspid agnathan fish Lechriaspis patula from the Devonian of Utah were likely caused by Jaekelopterus howelli. The latest research indicates that Jaekelopterus was an active and visual predator. Fully grown Jaekelopterus would have been apex predators in their environments and likely preyed upon smaller arthropods (including resorting to cannibalism) and early vertebrates.

A powerful and active predator, Jaekelopterus was likely highly agile and possessed high maneuverability. The hydromechanics of the swimming paddles and telsons of Jaekelopterus and other pterygotids suggest that all members of the group were capable of hovering, forward locomotion and quick turns. Though they were not necessarily rapidly swimming animals, they were likely able to give chase to prey in habitats such as lagoons and estuaries.

== See also ==
- List of eurypterid genera
- Timeline of eurypterid research
- Largest prehistoric animals
