= Lawrence Formation =

Lawrence Formation Lawrence Shale
- Stratigraphic range: Kasimovian (Virgilian stage)
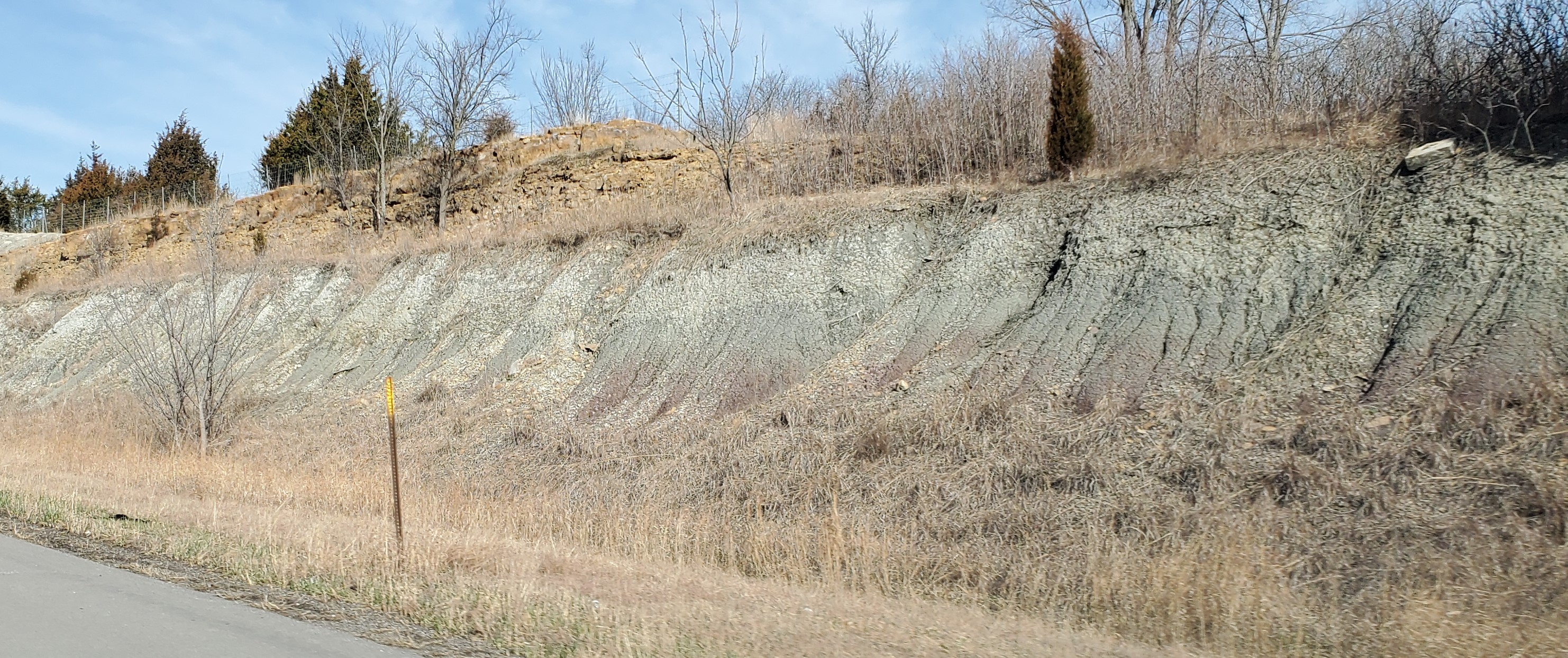
- Upper shale of the Lawrence Formation in roadcut of the South Lawrence Trafficway (US-40/K-10) In the upper background, the brown Toronto Limestone member is the base of the Oread Limestone.
- Type: Formation
- Unit of: Kansas, et al: Douglas Group; Oklahoma: Vamoosa Group
- Sub-units: Kansas usage: Amazonia Limestone; Ireland Sandstone; Robbins Shale Member; Haskell Limestone (removed 2002)
- Underlies: Oread Limestone
- Overlies: Cass Limestone

Lithology
- Primary: Shale
- Other: Limestone, sandstone

Location
- Region: Kansas
- Country: United States

Type section
- Named for: Lawrence, Kansas
- Named by: Erasmus Haworth
- Year defined: 1894

The Lawrence Formation, also referred to as Lawrence Shale, is a Late-Carboniferous geologic formation in Kansas, extending into Nebraska, Iowa, Missouri, and Oklahoma. This unit was named by Erasmus Haworth in 1894, the year that Haworth founded the Kansas Geological Survey in Lawrence, Kansas, having personally surveyed the formation the year before.

== See also ==
- List of fossiliferous stratigraphic units in Kansas
- Paleontology in Kansas
