= Heteroconger astroblematicus =

Heteroconger astroblematicus Temporal range: Selandian

Scientific classification
- Kingdom: Animalia
- Phylum: Chordata
- Class: Actinopterygii
- Order: Anguilliformes
- Family: Congridae
- Genus: Heteroconger
- Species: H. astroblematicus

Binomial name
- Heteroconger astroblematicus Schwarzhans & Bratishko, 2011

Extinct species of eel

Heteroconger astroblematicus is an extinct species of Heteroconger that lived during the Selandian stage of the Palaeocene epoch.

== Description ==
Heteroconger astroblematicus was described in 2011 based on fossils of otoliths with moderately pointed, median anterior and posterior tips and a variable extended postdorsal region that sometimes contained a postdorsal angle, with the rims otherwise being smooth and having no angles. The sulcus on the convex inner face is inclined at angle of 10° to 15° and is somewhat deepened, in particular the ostium. Its cauda are short and slightly bent, containing a rounded tip.

== Distribution ==
Heteroconger astroblematicus fossils are known from Ukraine. Specifically, its otolith fossils were discovered at Luzanivka, a fossil site in the Cherkasy district of central Ukraine.
