= Neocybium =

Scientific classification
- Domain: Eukaryota
- Kingdom: Animalia
- Phylum: Chordata
- Class: Actinopterygii
- Order: Perciformes
- Genus: †Neocybium; Leriche, 1906

Extinct genus of fishes

Neocybium is an extinct genus of prehistoric perciform fish.

== See also ==
- Prehistoric fish
- List of prehistoric bony fish
