= Guntherichthys =

Guntherichthys Temporal range: early Pennsylvanian (Bashkirian)

Scientific classification
- Kingdom: Animalia
- Phylum: Chordata
- Class: Actinopterygii
- Genus: †Guntherichthys; Mickle, 2011

Type species
- †Guntherichthys lehiensis Mickle, 2011

Extinct genus of ray-finned fishes

Guntherichthys is a genus of extinct marine ray-finned fish that lived during the mid-late Carboniferous (early Pennsylvanian) in what is now Utah, United States. Fossils were recovered from the Manning Canyon Shale. The genus is named after Lloyd Gunther. As with other early ray-finned fish, it displays typical "palaeoniscoid" morphology, although this is not taxonomically informative to its placement.
