= USS Blue Jacket =

USS Blue Jacket is a name used more than once by the U.S. Navy:

- USNS Blue Jacket (T-AF-51), a C2-S-B1 type freighter as laid down 23 October 1941 at Oakland, California.
- USS Blue Jacket, a landlocked destroyer replica used to train recruits between 1968 and 1993 at Naval Training Center Orlando in Florida.

See also

- Bluejacket (disambiguation), for merchant ships and other naval ships with this name
