= Ogilbia luzanensis =

Ogilbia luzanensis Temporal range: Selandian

Scientific classification
- Kingdom: Animalia
- Phylum: Chordata
- Class: Actinopterygii
- Order: Ophidiiformes
- Family: Bythitidae
- Genus: Ogilbia
- Species: †O. luzanensis

Binomial name
- †Ogilbia luzanensis Schwarzhans & Bratishko, 2011

Extinct species of fish

Ogilbia luzanensis is an extinct species of Ogilbia that lived during the Selandian stage of the Palaeocene epoch.

== Description ==
Ogilbia luzanensis remains consist of elongate otoliths up to about 4 mm in length. They have a dorsal rim with rounded predorsal and postdorsal angles as well as usually a distinct concavity behind the postdorsal angle. Their ventral rim is regularly curved and is deepest in front of its middle. Their anterior tip is pointed, while their anterior rim is curved below the tip and straight, inclined above. Their posterior tip is broad and dorsally shifted. The inner face, meanwhile, is slightly convex.

== Distribution ==
Ogilbia luzanensis Fossils are known from Ukraine, specifically the Luzanivka locality in the centre of the country.
