= Chlorophthalmus udovichenkoi =

Chlorophthalmus udovichenkoi Temporal range: Selandian

Scientific classification
- Kingdom: Animalia
- Phylum: Chordata
- Class: Actinopterygii
- Order: Aulopiformes
- Family: Chlorophthalmidae
- Genus: Chlorophthalmus
- Species: †C. udovichenkoi

Binomial name
- †Chlorophthalmus udovichenkoi Schwarzhans & Bratishko, 2011

Extinct species of fish

Chlorophthalmus udovichenkoi is an extinct species of Chlorophthalmus that lived during the Selandian stage of the Palaeocene epoch.

== Etymology ==
The specific epithet of Chlorophthalmus udovichenkoi honours the scientist N. I. Udovichenko of Luhansk for their academic contributions to the study of prehistoric chondrichthyans of Ukraine.

== Description ==
Chlorophthalmus udovichenkoi is diagnosed based on the fact that the taxon consists of an otolith with an undulating dorsal rim and a slight twist of its inner face outwards posteriorly. Its sulcus is narrow and long, and is distinctly inclined at angle of approximately 10°. Its cauda are slightly downturned, with their pointed tip reaching near to the postdorsal rim of the otolith.

== Distribution ==
Chlorophthalmus udovichenkoi fossils are known from the site of Luzanivka in central Ukraine.
