= Blue Jacket Creek =

Stream in Logan County, Ohio, United States

Coordinates: 40°21′50″N 83°51′42″W

Blue Jacket Creek is a stream located entirely within Logan County, Ohio. The 7.8-mile (12.6 km) long stream is a tributary of Bokengehalas Creek.

Blue Jacket Creek was named after Blue Jacket, an Indian chief.

== See also ==
- List of rivers of Ohio
