= Cristigerina =

Cristigerina Temporal range: Early Eocene

Scientific classification
- Domain: Eukaryota
- Kingdom: Animalia
- Phylum: Chordata
- Class: Actinopterygii
- Order: Perciformes
- Genus: †Cristigerina; Leriche, 1905
- Species: †C. crassa

Binomial name
- †Cristigerina crassa Leriche, 1905

Extinct genus of fishes

Cristigerina is an extinct genus of prehistoric marine perciform fish that lived during the Eocene. It contains a single species, C. crassa from the early Ypresian of Belgium.

== See also ==
- Prehistoric fish
- List of prehistoric bony fish
