= Centroberyx anguinicauda =

Centroberyx anguinicauda Temporal range: Selandian

Scientific classification
- Kingdom: Animalia
- Phylum: Chordata
- Class: Actinopterygii
- Order: Beryciformes
- Family: Berycidae
- Genus: Centroberyx
- Species: †C. anguinicauda

Binomial name
- †Centroberyx anguinicauda Schwarzhans & Bratishko, 2011

Extinct species of fish

Centroberyx anguinicauda is an extinct species of Centroberyx that lived during the Selandian stage of the Palaeocene epoch.

== Distribution ==
Centroberyx anguinicauda fossils are known from Ukraine.
