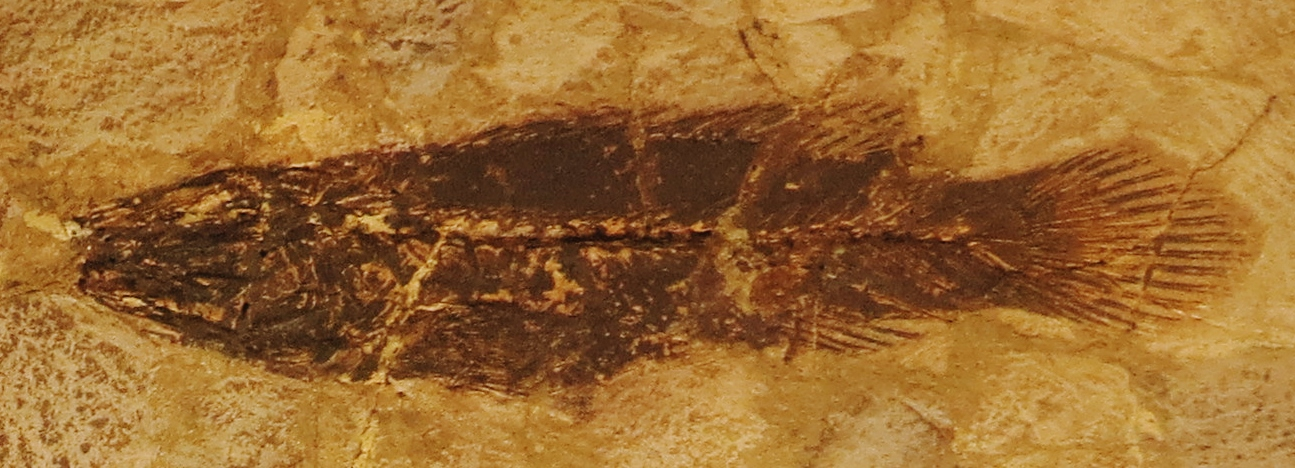
- Specimen of E. veronensis, Museo di Storia Naturale di Verona

Scientific classification
- Kingdom: Animalia
- Phylum: Chordata
- Class: Actinopterygii
- Order: Perciformes (?)
- Family: †Eocottidae; Bannikov, 2004
- Genus: †Eocottus; Woodward, 1901
- Species: †E. veronensis

Binomial name
- †Eocottus veronensis (Volta, 1796)

Synonyms
- †Gobius veronensis Volta, 1796

= Eocottus =

Eocottus Temporal range: Early Eocene

Extinct genus of fishes

Eocottus (meaning "dawn Cottus") is an extinct genus of prehistoric marine ray-finned fish that lived during the early Eocene. It contains a single species, E. veronensis from the Monte Bolca site of Italy.

Eocottus was a small fish that superficially resembled a goby or sculpin. It was initially described in Gobius by Volta (1796) (first erroneously as a fossil specimen of the Atlantic mudskipper, then Gobius barbatus, and then as its own species, G. veronensis), and moved to its own genus Eocottus by Woodward (1901), who considered it to be a relative of sculpins, hence its new name. However, Bannikov (2004) determined it to be not closely related to any modern percomorph group, and placed it in its own family Eocottidae alongside Bassanichthys. Eocottidae may potentially belong to the Perciformes, although this is uncertain.

== See also ==
- Prehistoric fish
- List of prehistoric bony fish
