= Aulorhamphus =

Aulorhamphus Temporal range: Early to Middle Eocene

Scientific classification
- Domain: Eukaryota
- Kingdom: Animalia
- Phylum: Chordata
- Class: Actinopterygii
- Order: Syngnathiformes
- Family: †Aulorhamphidae
- Genus: †Aulorhamphus; Zigno, 1887

Species
- See text

Extinct genus of fishes

Aulorhamphus is an extinct genus of prehistoric marine ray-finned fish that lived from the early to middle Eocene. It contains four species known from the Early Eocene of Italy (Monte Bolca) and the Middle Eocene of Russia. It was an aulorhamphid, an extinct family of syngnathiform fishes.

The following species are known:

- A. bolcensis (Steindachner, 1863) - Ypresian of Italy
- A. capellini Zigno, 1887- Ypresian of Italy
- A. caucasicus Bannikov & Tyler, 2006 - Lutetian/Bartonian of the North Caucasus, Russia
- A. chiarisorbiniae Bannikov & Tyler, 2011 - Ypresian of Italy
