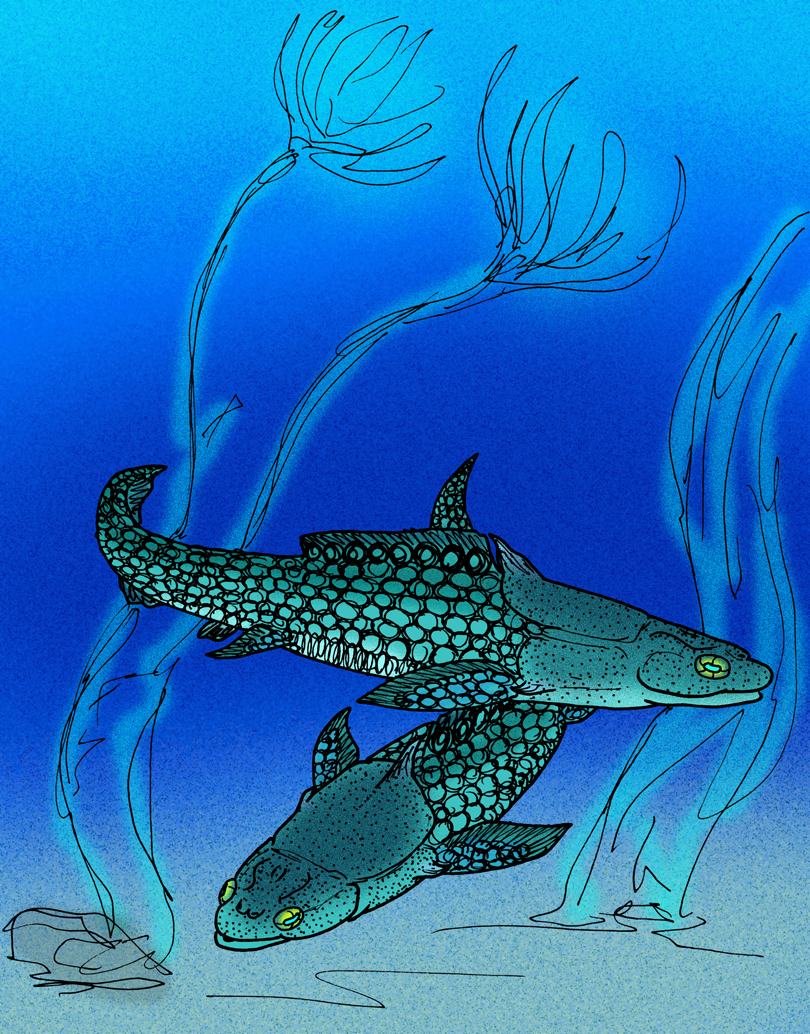

Scientific classification
- Domain: Eukaryota
- Kingdom: Animalia
- Phylum: Chordata
- Class: †Placodermi
- Order: †Acanthothoraci
- Genus: †Arabosteus; Olive et al., 2011
- Species: †A. variabilis

Binomial name
- †Arabosteus variabilis Olive et al., 2011

= Arabosteus =

Arabosteus Temporal range: Early Devonian

Extinct genus of fishes

Arabosteus is an extinct genus of palaecanthaspid placoderm that inhabited what is now Saudi Arabia during the Early Devonian epoch. Its only species is Arabosteus variabilis.
