= Ankylophorus =

Ankylophorus Temporal range: Late Jurassic

Scientific classification
- Kingdom: Animalia
- Phylum: Chordata
- Class: Actinopterygii
- Order: †Ankylophoriformes
- Family: †Ankylophoridae
- Genus: †Ankylophorus; Gaudant, 1978
- Species: †A. similis

Binomial name
- †Ankylophorus similis (Woodward, 1895)

Extinct genus of ray-finned fishes

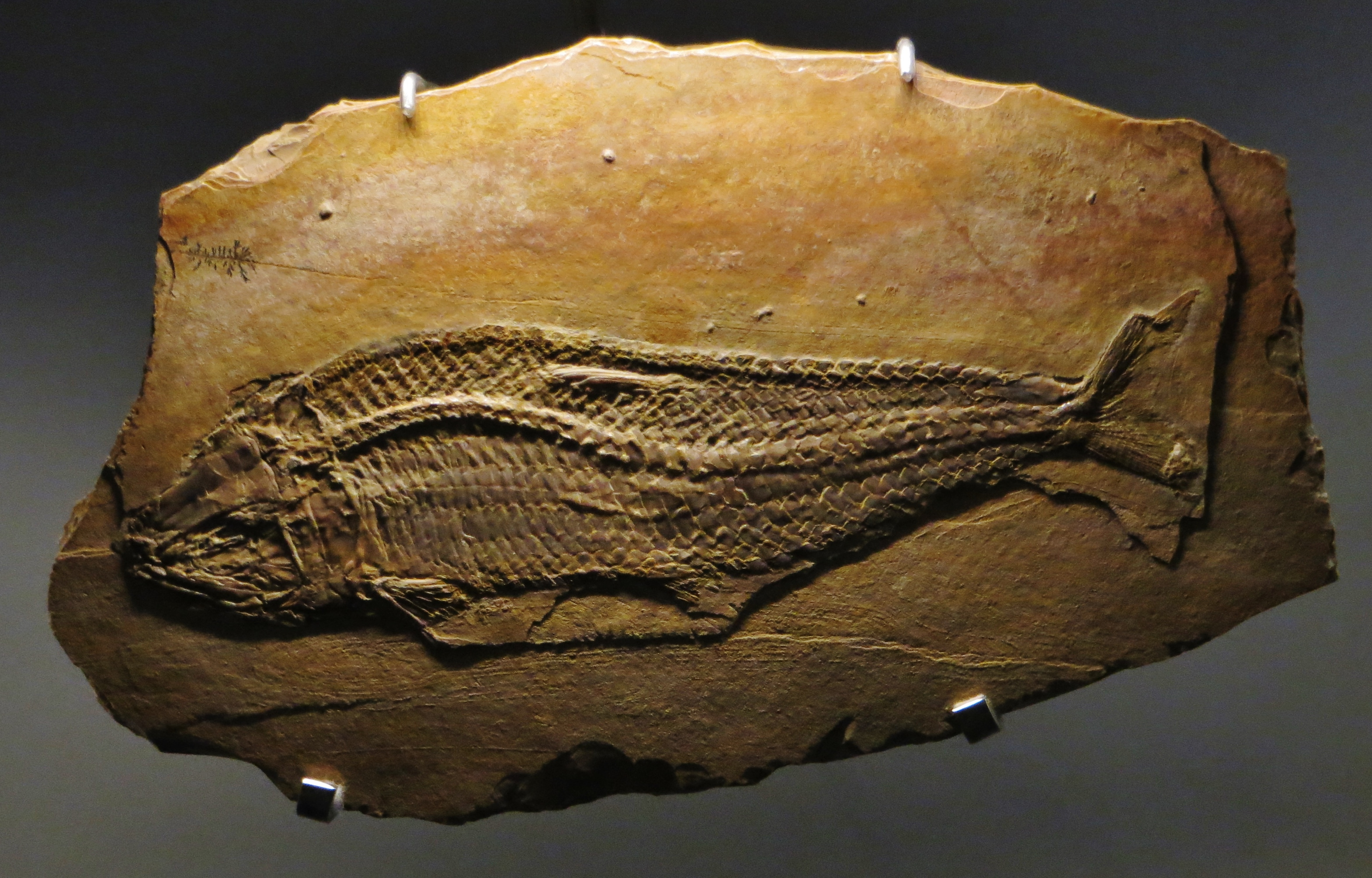
Ankylophorus similis fossil

Ankylophorus is an extinct genus of stem-teleost ray-finned fish that lived in what is now France during the Late Jurassic. Its type and only species, Ankylophorus similis, was originally named in 1895 as a species of Pholidophorus, but was moved to a separate genus in 1978.
