= Bokengehalas Creek =

Stream in Ohio, U.S.

Bokengehalas Creek is a stream in the U.S. state of Ohio. It is a tributary of the Great Miami River.

Bokengehalas Creek was named for a Delaware Indian chief who settled near its banks.

== Location ==
- Mouth: Confluence with the Great Miami River at De Graff 40°18′34″N 83°55′32″W
- Origin: Logan County northeast of Bellefontaine 40°23′00″N 83°43′15″W

== See also ==
- List of rivers of Ohio
