= Karksiodus =

Karksiodus Temporal range: Givetian

Scientific classification
- Kingdom: Animalia
- Phylum: Chordata
- Class: Chondrichthyes
- Subclass: Elasmobranchii
- Genus: †Karksiodus
- Species: †K. mirus

Binomial name
- †Karksiodus mirus Ivanov et al., 2011

Extinct genus of cartilaginous fish

Karksiodus is an extinct monotypic genus of cartilaginous fish that lived in what is now Estonia during the Givetian stage of the Middle Devonian epoch.

== Etymology ==
The generic name Karksiodus references the Karksi locality, where the fossils of the genus were found, and the Greek word odus, meaning tooth. The specific epithet of the type and only species, Karksiodus mirus, is derived from the Latin word mirus, meaning extraordinary or astonishing.
