= Haskell Limestone =

- Stratigraphic range: Kasimovian (Missourian stage)
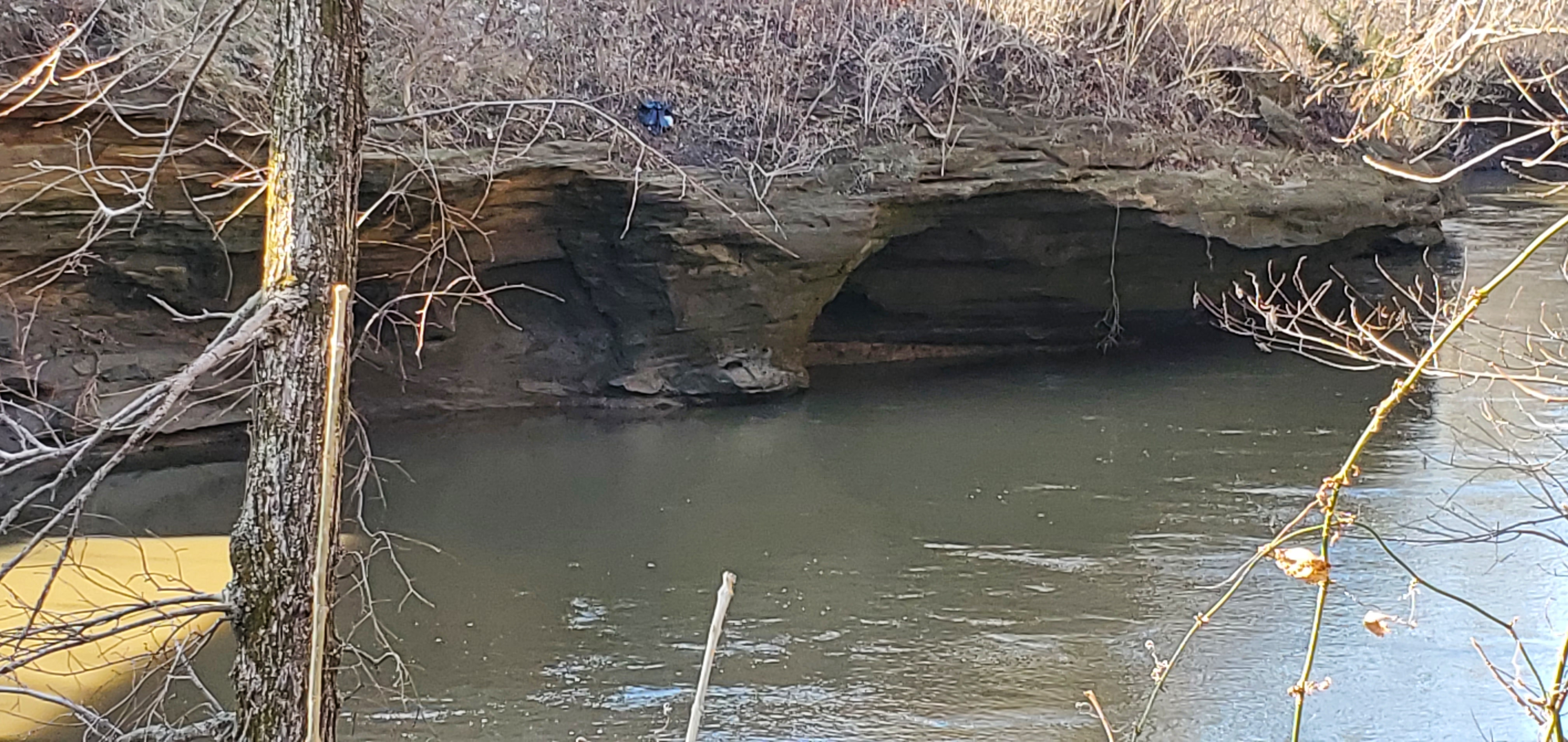
- Haskell Limestone outcrops along the banks of the Wakarusa River south of Lawrence, Kansas, here, near Blue Jacket's Crossing, close to the Haskell Institute.
- Type: Formation member
- Unit of: Cass Formation of the Douglas Group

Lithology
- Primary: Limestone

Location
- Region: Kansas and neighboring states
- Country: United States

Type section
- Named for: Haskell Indian Nations University
- Named by: R.C. Moore
- Year defined: 1931

Haskell Limestone is a geological unit name originating in Kansas and used in adjoining states. The Pennsylvanian period unit was named by R.C. Moore for the Haskell Institute in the southeast of Lawrence, Kansas in 1931. The name has been applied to various beds within this range, and assigned as a member variously to the Lawrence Formation, Cass Formation, and Stranger Formation, and significant legacy literature exists for each classification. These three formations now comprise the Douglas Group.

In 2002, within the effort to improve the correlation of Missourian stage geology between the states of Missouri and Kansas, as well as Nebraska and Iowa, the Haskell was assigned in Kansas to the Cass Formation as its lowest member (on the basis of distinct changes in fossil species).

== Distribution and outcrop ==
The Haskell Limestone is recognized in deep hydrocarbon well logs throughout most of the state of Kansas; the "hot shale" gamma ray log "kicks" associated with the Haskell unit make it an easily identifiable datum/marker bed. However, as a stage in the Pennsylvania-Permian marine embayment of Kansas (Midcontinent Basin), the unit extends only limited distances into Oklahoma, Colorado, Nebraska, Missouri, and Iowa.

The Haskell Limestone's outcrop extends from northeast Oklahoma through Douglas County, Kansas, continuing into the adjoining corners of Nebraska, Missouri, and Iowa.

== Blue Jacket's Crossing ==
Proceeding west from Independence, Missouri, the Oregon Trail kept a distance south from the incised bluffs nearer the Kansas River. However, it was unavoidable to cross the Wakarusa River and gain the crest of the hogback ridge between the Wakarusa and Kansas Rivers. Here, the Wakarusa had steep banks about 20 feet high. Moreover, on the south bank, the river cut into the outcrop of the Haskell Limestone as seen above. To cross the rivers, westbound wagons had to be unloaded and disassembled. The cargo and wagon parts were lowered down the limestone bed, rafted across the river, and pulled by rope up the other bank. Shawnee Indian Paschal Fish, who had settled on the river, assisted travelers in the crossing. In 1855, Shawnee chief and Methodist minister Charles Blue Jacket, received authority to create a crossing by cutting ramps into the limestone and soils of the banks, greatly speeding transport across the river.

City parks in Eudora commemorate Blue Jacket's Crossing and Pashal Fish.

== Viewing and access ==
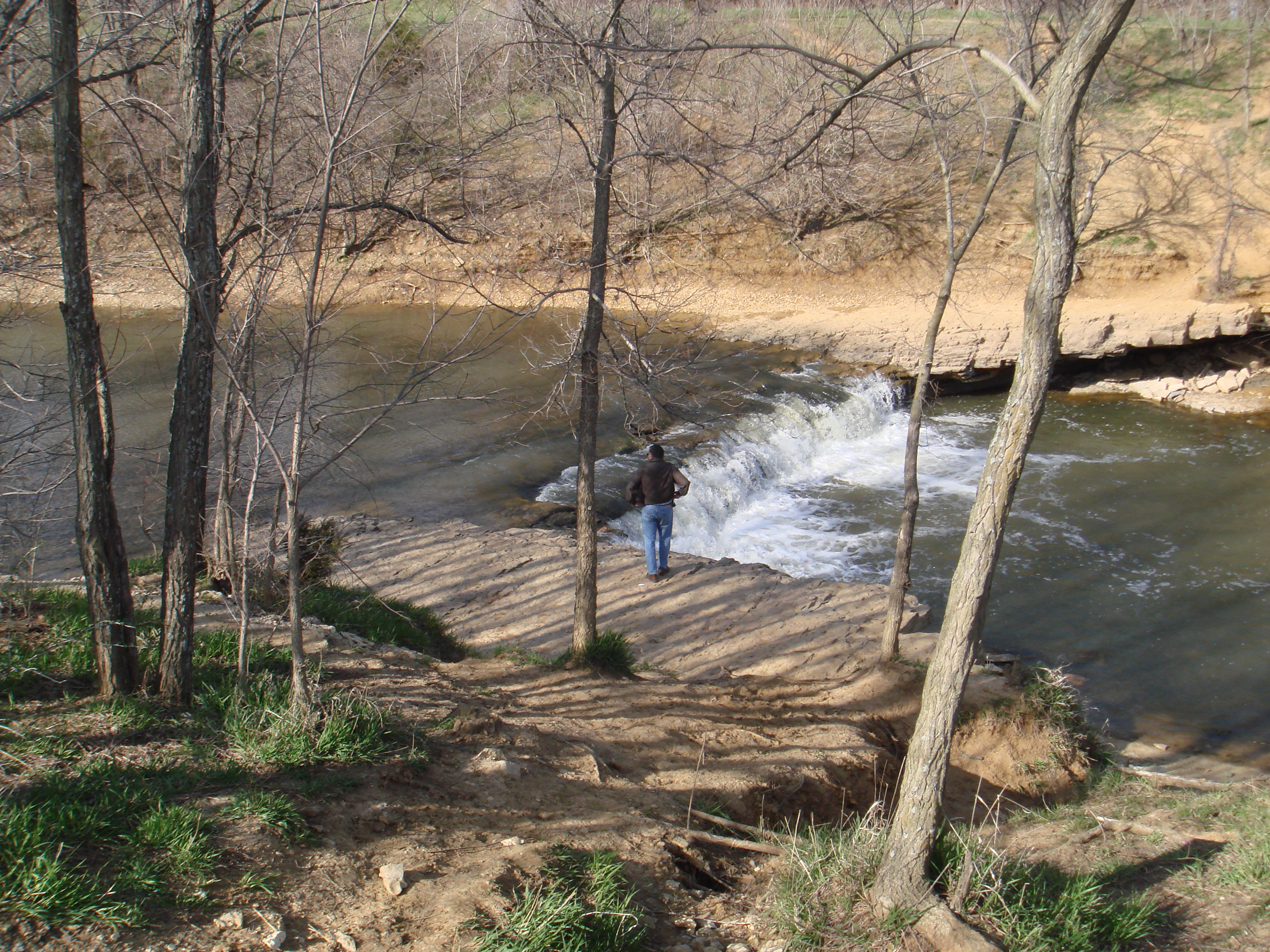
Public waterfall over the Haskell Limestone at Clinton Lake outlet park

An outcrop of the Haskell Limestone (pictured above) occurs on the bridge right-of-way of Douglas County Highway 1057 a half mile south of the E 1900 Road exit of the K-10 between Lawrence and Eudora. The actual historic Blue Jacket’s Crossing is about 1 mile east of this bridge.

The Clinton Lake Dam was constructed across the Wakarusa River valley just upstream of where that river has cut down through the Haskell Limestone, forming a waterfall (pictured right). This waterfall is a public feature of the Clinton Lake Outlet Park. The outcrop of the Haskell Limestone is generally present in the river's banks from here to the Kansas River.
