= Tassiliodus =

Tassiliodus Temporal range: Early Devonian, Emsian

Scientific classification
- Domain: Eukaryota
- Kingdom: Animalia
- Phylum: Chordata
- Class: Chondrichthyes
- Subclass: Euselachii
- Genus: †Tassiliodus; Derycke & Goujet, 2011

Type species
- †Tassiliodus lessardi Derycke & Goujet, 2011

Extinct genus of cartilaginous fishes

Tassiliodus is an extinct genus of euselachian chondrichthyan known from the Early Devonian of southern Algeria.

== Discovery ==
Tassiliodus is known from the holotype specimen MNHN.F.ALD-15, a complete tooth. Other syntypes include MNHN.F.ALD-16 (a tooth), scales MNHN.F.ALD-17 to 35 and thin sections MNHN.F.ALD-30-32, 34 and 35. Apart from the syntypes, additional 107 scales are known, all of which were collected in the type locality. Tassiliodus specimens were collected near In Guezzam, from the Oued Felaou or Anou Izileg of southern Algeria, which dates to the Emsian stage of the late Early Devonian.

== Etymology ==
Tassiliodus was first named by Claire Derycke and Daniel Goujet in 2011 and the type species is Tassiliodus lessardi. The generic name is derived from locality in which the specimens were found, Tassili Oua-N'ahaggar of Tamanghasset, Algeria and from Greek odus meaning "tooth". The specific name honors L. Lessard, a hydrogeologist who discovered the material in the 1960s.
