= Charles Blue Jacket =

Shawnee chief and Methodist minister

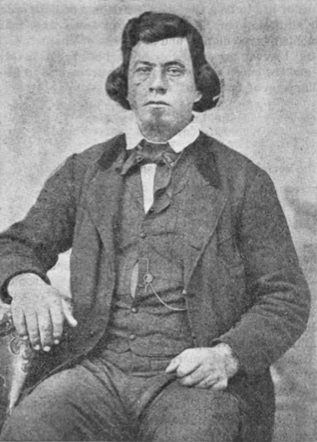
Portrait of Charles Blue Jacket

Charles Blue Jacket (1817 – October 29, 1897) was a Shawnee chief in Kansas, as well as a Methodist minister. He was the grandson of the Shawnee Chief Blue Jacket by his son George Blue Jacket. Charles' mother is unknown, but is believed to have been a Shawnee. His maternal grandmother was the daughter of a Shawnee woman and Jacques Baby.

The younger Blue Jacket was born along the south banks of the Huron River in Michigan in what is today Monroe County, Michigan. However, a very short time after Blue Jacket's birth, the family moved to Piqua, Ohio.

Blue Jacket was educated at the Quaker School in Piqua and mission schools in Kansas. The Blue Jacket family moved to Kansas in 1833. He served as an interpreter for the United States governor and was a farmer and businessman in what is today Kansas City, Kansas and its vicinity. He raised large numbers of hogs and cattle. Also, in 1855, Blue Jacket and two of his brothers opened a ferry on the Wakarusa River at Lawrence, Kansas, called Blue Jacket's Crossing.

He served as chief of the Shawnee tribe from 1861–1864. Two of his sons served in the Union Army during the American Civil War, and one of his daughters-in-law killed one of the raiders under William Quantrill who had invaded her home.

In 1869, Blue Jacket moved to Oklahoma with most of the other Shawnees. Bluejacket, Oklahoma, received its name because he settled nearby, and he served as the town's post master and as the minister of the town's Methodist Church.
