= Pietschellus =

Pietschellus Temporal range: Early Eocene, Ypresian

Scientific classification
- Kingdom: Animalia
- Phylum: Chordata
- Class: Actinopterygii
- Superorder: Acanthopterygii
- Clade: Percomorpha
- Genus: †Pietschellus; Bannikov & Carnevale, 2011

Species
- P. aenigmaticus Bannikov & Carnevale, 2011 (type)

Extinct genus of fishes

Pietschellus is an extinct genus of enigmatic bony fish which existed in northern Italy during the early Eocene epoch (Ypresian age). It is known from a single well-preserved nearly complete specimen recovered from the Monte Postale site of the Monte Bolca locality. It was first named by Alexandre F. Bannikov and Giorgio Carnevale in 2011 and the type species is Pietschellus aenigmaticus.
