= Caucasichthys =

Caucasichthys Temporal range: Middle Eocene, Bartonian

Scientific classification
- Kingdom: Animalia
- Phylum: Chordata
- Class: Actinopterygii
- Order: Perciformes
- Family: †Caucasichthyidae; Bannikov et al., 2011
- Genus: †Caucasichthys; Bannikov et al., 2011

Type species
- Caucasichthys kumaensis Bannikov, Carnevale & Parin, 2011

Extinct genus of fishes

Caucasichthys is an extinct genus of perciform bony fish which existed in Russia during the middle Eocene epoch (Bartonian age). It is known from the Gorny Luch locality of northern Caucasus. It was first named by Alexandre F. Bannikov, Giorgio Carnevale and N. V. Parin in 2011 and the type species is Caucasichthys kumaensis. The generic name comes from Caucas, from Caucasus and ichthys, fish. The specific name is derived from the Kuma Horizon, where the fossils were found.
