= Lechriaspis =

Lechriaspis Temporal range: Early Devonian, Emsian

Scientific classification
- Domain: Eukaryota
- Kingdom: Animalia
- Phylum: Chordata
- Infraphylum: Agnatha
- Class: †Pteraspidomorpha
- Subclass: †Heterostraci
- Order: †Cyathaspidiformes
- Family: †Poraspidae
- Genus: †Lechriaspis; Elliott & Petriello, 2011

Type species
- †Lechriaspis patula Elliott & Petriello, 2011

Extinct genus of jawless fishes

Lechriaspis is an extinct genus of poraspid heterostracan agnathan known from the Early Devonian of northern Utah, western United States.

== Discovery ==
Lechriaspis is known only from the holotype specimen. It was collected from the Grassy Flat Member of the Water Canyon Formation of northern Utah, which dates to the Emsian stage of the late Early Devonian. The specimen shows evidence of puncture wounds indicating predation by a eurypterid. Lechriaspis and Poraspis thomasi represent the first true members of the Cyathaspidida to be described from the Devonian of the western United States.

== Etymology ==
Lechriaspis was first named by David K. Elliott and Michael A. Petriello in 2011 and the type species is Lechriaspis patula.
