= Douglas Group =

Geologic formation

- Type: Group

Location
- Region: Kansas
- Country: United States

The Douglas Group is a geologic group in Kansas. It preserves fossils.

== See also ==
- List of fossiliferous stratigraphic units in Kansas
- Paleontology in Kansas
