= Selandian =

Second Age of the Paleocene Epoch

- 61.66 – 59.24 Ma

Chronology
← / PETM; ← / First Antarctic permanent ice-sheets; ← / K-Pg mass extinction
Subdivision of the Paleogene according to the ICS, as of 2024. Vertical axis scale: Millions of years ago
- Formerly part of: Tertiary Period/System

Etymology
- Name formality: Formal

Usage information
- Celestial body: Earth
- Regional usage: Global (ICS)
- Time scale(s) used: ICS Time Scale

Definition
- Chronological unit: Age
- Stratigraphic unit: Stage
- Time span formality: Formal
- Lower boundary definition: Onset of sea-level drop and carbon isotope shift
- Lower boundary GSSP: Zumaia Section, Basque Country, Spain; 43.2992°N 2.2610°W
- Lower GSSP ratified: 2008
- Upper boundary definition: Base of magnetic polarity chronozone C26n
- Upper boundary GSSP: Zumaia Section, Basque Country, Spain; 43.2996°N 2.2609°W
- Upper GSSP ratified: 2008

The Selandian is a stage in the Paleocene. It spans the time between 61.66 and 59.24 Ma. It is preceded by the Danian and followed by the Thanetian. Sometimes the Paleocene is subdivided in subepochs, in which the Selandian forms the "middle Paleocene".

== Stratigraphic definition ==
The Selandian was introduced in scientific literature by Danish geologist Alfred Rosenkrantz in 1924. It is named after the Danish island of Zealand (Danish: Sjælland) given its prevalence there.

The base of the Selandian is close to the boundary between biozones NP4 and NP5. It is slightly after the first appearances of many new species of the calcareous nanoplankton genus Fasciculithus (F. ulii, F. billii, F. janii, F. involutus, F. tympaniformis and F. pileatus) and close to the first appearance of calcareous nanoplankton species Neochiastozygus perfectus. At the original type location in Denmark the base of the Selandian is an unconformity. The official Global Boundary Stratotype Section and Point (GSSP) was established in the Zumaia section (43°18′N 002°16′W) at the beach of Itzurun in the Basque Country, northern Spain.

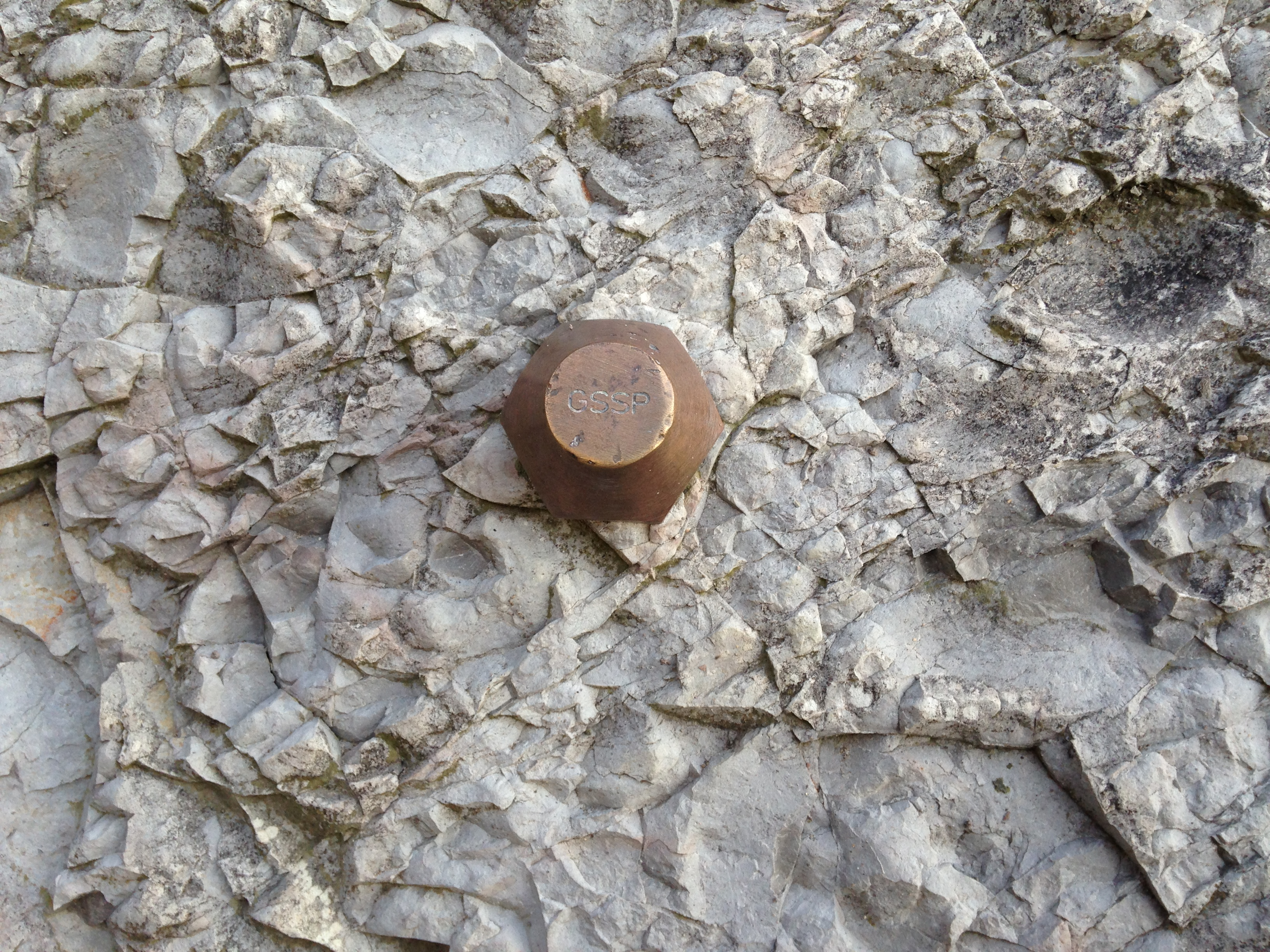
The Global Boundary Stratotype Section and Point (GSSP) marking the lower boundary of the Selandian at Itzurun, Spain

The top of the Selandian (the base of the Thanetian) is laid at the base of magnetic chronozone C26n.

The Selandian Stage overlaps with the lower part of the Tiffanian North American Land Mammal Age, the Peligran, Tiupampan and lower Itaboraian South American Land Mammal Ages and part of the Nongshanian Asian Land Mammal Age. It is coeval with the lower part of the Wangerripian Stage from the Australian regional timescale.

The start of the Selandian represents a sharp depositional change in the North Sea Basin, where there is a shift to siliciclastic deposition due to the uplift and erosion of the Scotland-Shetland area after nearly 40 million years of calcium carbonate deposition. This change occurs at the same time as the onset of a foreland basin formation in Spitsbergen due to compression between Greenland and Svalbard, suggesting a common tectonic cause that altered the relative motions of the Greenland Plate and the Eurasian Plate. This plate reorganisation event is also manifest as a change in seafloor spreading direction in the Labrador Sea around this time.

== Fauna and Flora ==
The fauna of the Selandian consisted of giant snakes (Titanoboa), crocodiles, champsosaurs, Gastornithiformes, owls; and a few archaic forms of mammals, such as mesonychids, pantodonts, primate relatives plesiadapids, and multiberculates.

=== Flora ===
The flora was composed of ferns and palm trees. Sets of fossils dating to this age collected in a 2023 study by scientists show a contrast of fossil richness with fossil-poor sites in North America and a fossil-rich site (two to three times more abundant) in Gelinden, Belgium. The data from Gelinden, where there were strong plant-arthropod interactions based on the wide array of associated damage to the plants, are consistent with other studies in Europe, Antarctica and South America suggesting that recovery from the End-Cretaceous mass extinction event was regionalized and that these three regions recovered faster than North America.
