= Lists of prehistoric fish =

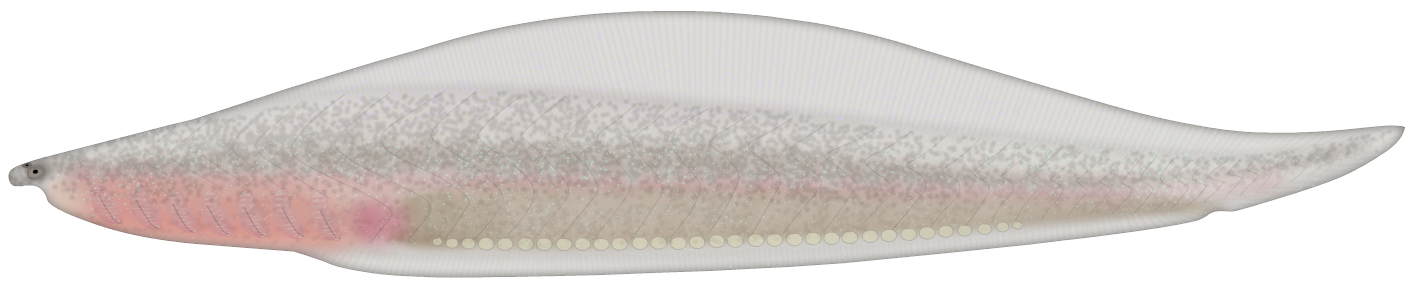
Haikouichthys, from about 518 million years ago in China, may be the earliest known fish.

Prehistoric fish are early fish that are known only from fossil records. They are the earliest known vertebrates, and include the first and extinct fish that lived through the Cambrian to the Quaternary. The study of prehistoric fish is called paleoichthyology. A few living forms, such as the coelacanth are also referred to as prehistoric fish, or even living fossils, due to their current rarity and similarity to extinct forms. Fish which have become recently extinct are not usually referred to as prehistoric fish.

Lists of various prehistoric fishes include:

- List of prehistoric jawless fish
- List of placoderms
- List of acanthodians
- List of prehistoric cartilaginous fish
- List of prehistoric bony fish
  - List of indeterminate prehistoric percomorph genera
  - List of sarcopterygians

== See also ==
- Evolution of fish
- Prehistoric life
- Vertebrate paleontology
