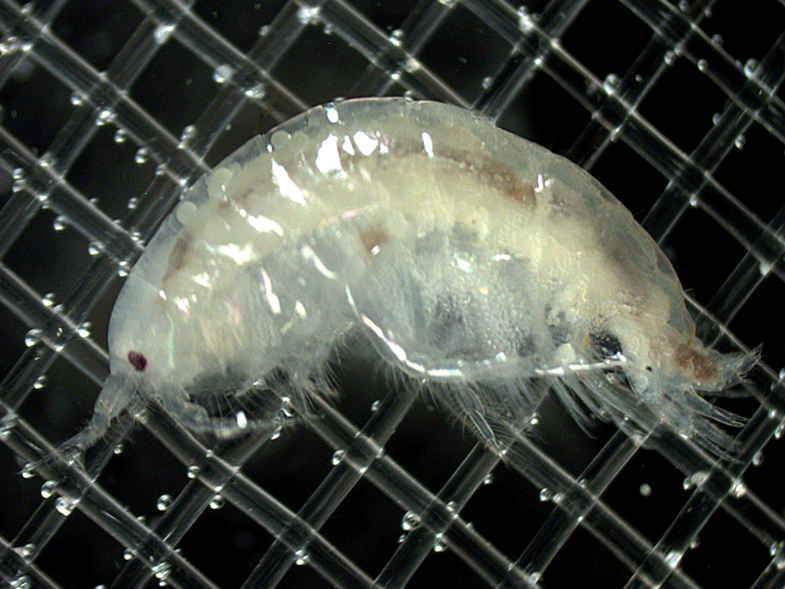

Scientific classification
- Kingdom: Animalia
- Phylum: Arthropoda
- Clade: Pancrustacea
- Class: Malacostraca
- Order: Amphipoda
- Family: Pontoporeiidae
- Genus: Monoporeia; Bousfield, 1989
- Species: M. affinis

Binomial name
- Monoporeia affinis (Lindström, 1855)

Synonyms
- Pontoporeia affinis Lindström, 1855

= Monoporeia =

Monoporeia affinis

Genus of crustaceans

Monoporeia affinis, (syn. Pontoporeia affinis) (Greek: Πόντος, póntos = Pontus / Black Sea; πορεία, poreía = to travel), is a small, yellowish benthic amphipod living in the Baltic Sea, the Arctic Sea and the lakes of the Nordic countries.

== Description ==
Monoporeia affinis measures up to 8 mm (0.31 in) long when fully grown, with two pairs of antennae and one pair of black eyes. The legs arising from the first three segments of the abdomen are expanded basally to form broad plates. Monoporeia affinis closely resembles another benthic amphipod, Pontoporeia femorata, which can be distinguished from M. affinis by its light red eyes.

== Ecology ==
M. affinis is one of the Baltic glacial relicts. Originally a freshwater species, it also exists in lakes. M. affinis lives on soft bottoms down to 80 metres; usually hundreds to thousands of individuals per square metre, but can get up to 10,000 to 20,000 per square metre. The amphipod has an important role in bioturbation (mixing and oxidating the bottom sediment). Monoporeia feeds on phytoplankton and decomposed organic matter sinking onto the bottom. M. affinis is itself the prey of Saduria entomon, Harmothoe sarsi (a polychaete) and fishes such as cod, herring and the fourhorn sculpin, Myoxocephalus quadricornis. The increasing loss of oxygen in the Baltic Sea bottoms – especially in the Gulf of Finland – has lately been affecting the M. affinis population, since its eggs and embryos are very sensitive to lack of oxygen. Thus M. affinis is often used as an indicator species of the state of bodies of water.

== Life cycle ==
After mating in the autumn and bearing over the winter, the female M. affinis gives birth to 20–30 offspring, which only happens once during its 2–4 year lifespan. M. affinis has a recurring population cycle, with abundance oscillating every 6 to 7 years.

== Taxonomic history ==
Monoporeia affinis was originally described in the genus Pontoporeia by Gustaf Lindström in 1855. It was moved to the new genus Monoporeia by Edward L. Bousfield in 1989, alongside two other species, M. microphthalma and M. gurjanovae.
