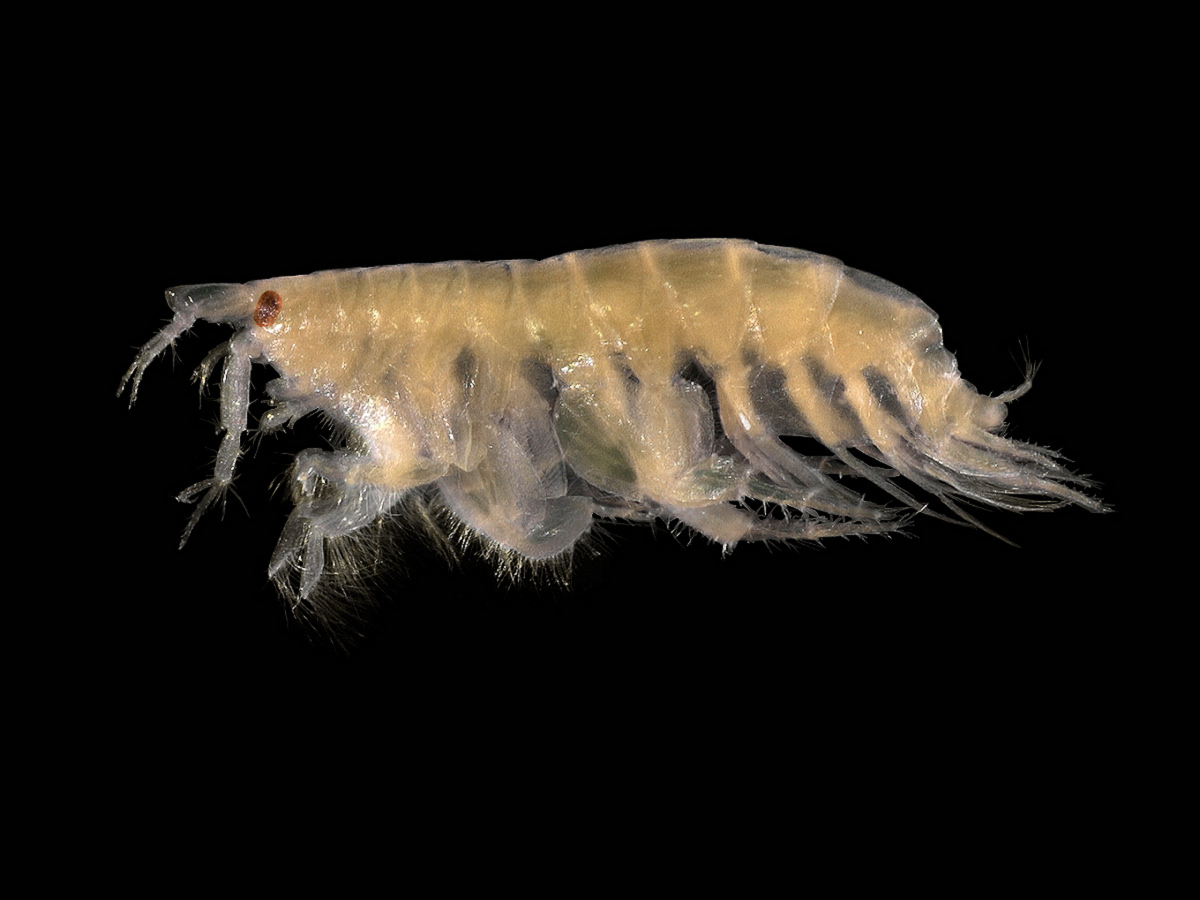
- Bathyporeia pelagica

Scientific classification
- Kingdom: Animalia
- Phylum: Arthropoda
- Clade: Pancrustacea
- Class: Malacostraca
- Order: Amphipoda
- Family: Pontoporeiidae
- Genus: Bathyporeia; Lindström, 1855

= Bathyporeia =

Genus of crustaceans

Bathyporeia is a genus of amphipods in the family Pontoporeiidae, containing the following species:

- Bathyporeia borgi d'Udekem d'Acoz & Vader, 2005
- Bathyporeia chevreuxi d'Udekem d'Acoz & Vader, 2005
- Bathyporeia cunctator d'Udekem d'Acoz & Vader, 2005
- Bathyporeia elegans Watkin, 1938
- Bathyporeia elkaimi d'Udekem d'Acoz & Menioui, 2004
- Bathyporeia gladiura d'Udekem d'Acoz & Vader, 2005
- Bathyporeia gracilis Sars, 1891
- Bathyporeia griffithsi d'Udekem d'Acoz & Vader, 2005
- Bathyporeia guilliamsoniana (Bate, 1857)
- Bathyporeia ledoyeri d'Udekem d'Acoz & Menioui, 2004
- Bathyporeia leucophthalma Bellan-Santini, 1973
- Bathyporeia lindstromi Stebbing, 1906
- Bathyporeia megalops Chevreux, 1911
- Bathyporeia microceras d'Udekem d'Acoz & Menioui, 2004
- Bathyporeia nana Toulmond, 1966
- Bathyporeia parkeri Bousfield, 1973
- Bathyporeia pelagica (Bate, 1856)
- Bathyporeia phaiophthalma Bellan-Santini, 1973
- Bathyporeia pilosa Lindström, 1855
- Bathyporeia pontica Marcusen, 1867
- Bathyporeia pseudopelagica Bellan-Santini & Vader, 1988
- Bathyporeia quoddyensis Shoemaker, 1949
- Bathyporeia sardoa Bellan-Santini & Vader, 1988
- Bathyporeia sarsi Watkin, 1938
- Bathyporeia sophiae Bellan-Santini & Vader, 1988
- Bathyporeia sunnivae Bellan-Santini & Vader, 1988
- Bathyporeia tenuipes Meinert, 1877
- Bathyporeia watkini d'Udekem d'Acoz, Echchaoui & Menioui, 2005

Bathy is from Greek bathos meaning deep, or depth and poreia is Greek meaning journey or pertaining to walking.
