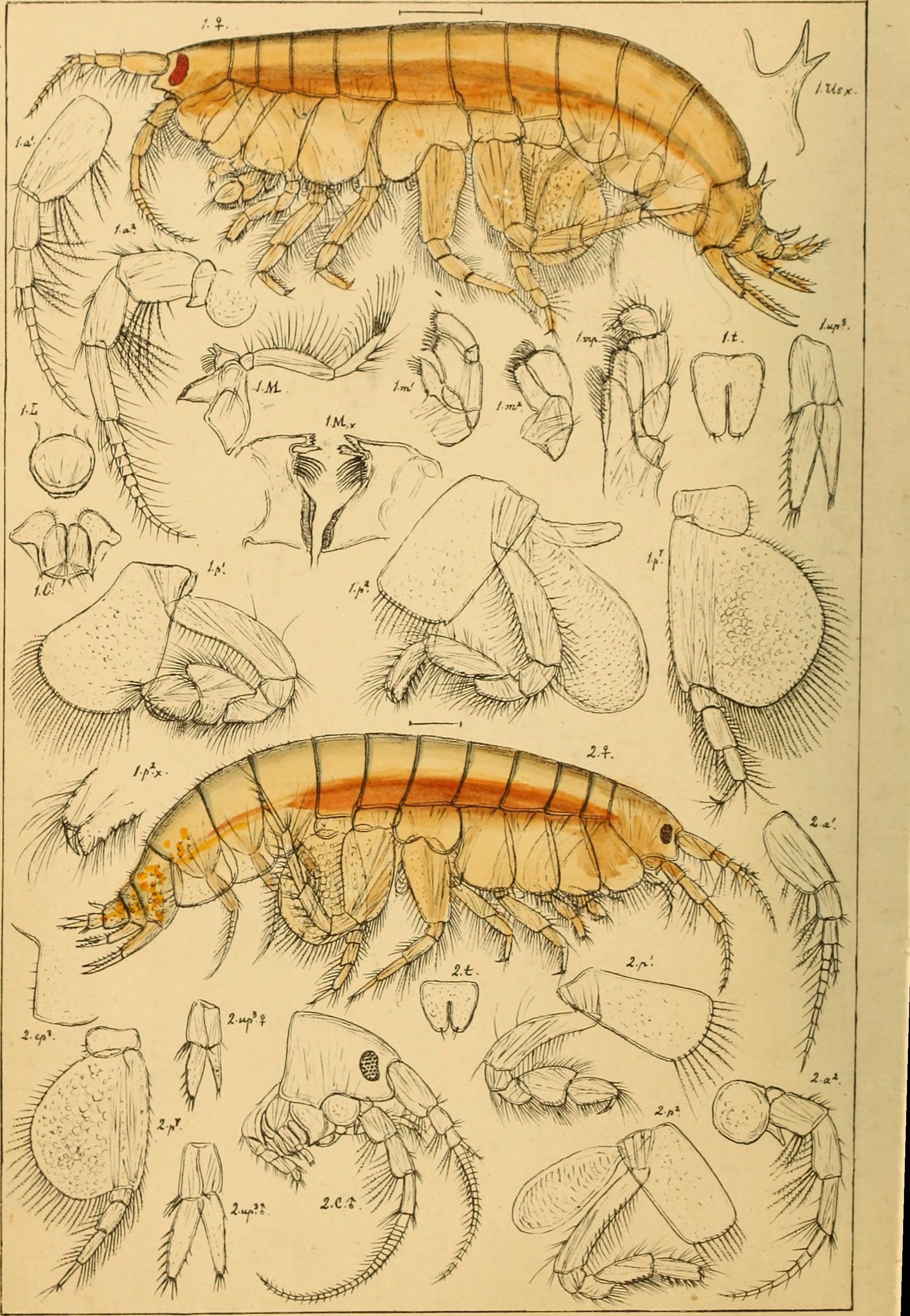
- Pontoporeia femorata (top). Former Pontoporeia affinis (bottom) is now Monoporeia affinis

Scientific classification
- Kingdom: Animalia
- Phylum: Arthropoda
- Class: Malacostraca
- Order: Amphipoda
- Family: Pontoporeiidae
- Genus: Pontoporeia; Krøyer, 1842
- Species: P. femorata

Binomial name
- Pontoporeia femorata Krøyer, 1842

Synonyms
- Pontoporeia ekmani Bulyčeva, 1936; Pontoporeia furcigera Bruzelius, 1859; Pontoporeia sinuata Ekman, 1913

= Pontoporeia femorata =

Genus of crustaceans

Pontoporeia is a monotypic genus of amphipods in the family Pontoporeiidae. The sole species is Pontoporeia femorata. Other species formerly assigned to this genus are now classified under Monoporeia and Diporeia. However, as currently delimited, Pontoporeia femorata might be a species complex.

== Distribution and habitat ==
Pontoporeia has a circumpolar and subartic distribution, including parts of the northern Atlantic and Pacific Oceans. It is also present in the Baltic Sea. It is a marine species that burrows in muddy and sandy-mud bottoms from the subtidal zone down to depths of 50 m (160 ft), sometimes more. In the Baltic proper, Pontoporeia femorata is a dominant species among soft-bottom benthic epifauna, mostly occurring where salinity exceeds 6 ‰.

Pontoporeia femorata is a deposit feeder that lives in the upper few centimeters of the sediment during the day but may swim above the seafloor during the night, especially during the mating season.

== Life cycle and reproduction ==
Pontoporeia femorata has a 2- or 3-year life cycle in the Baltic. Males die after mating and females after releasing their brood.
