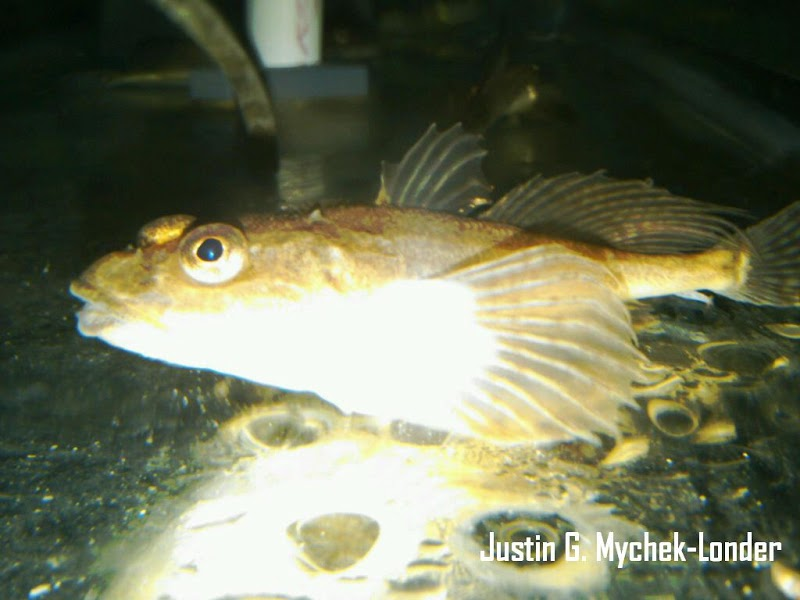

Conservation status
- Least Concern (IUCN 3.1)

Scientific classification
- Kingdom: Animalia
- Phylum: Chordata
- Class: Actinopterygii
- Division: Teleostei
- Order: Perciformes
- Suborder: Cottoidei
- Family: Psychrolutidae
- Genus: Myoxocephalus
- Species: M. thompsonii

Binomial name
- Myoxocephalus thompsonii (Girard, 1851)

Synonyms
- Triglopsis thompsonii Girard, 1851

= Deepwater sculpin =

Species of fish

The deepwater sculpin (Myoxocephalus thompsonii) is a North American freshwater fish in the family Psychrolutidae of suborder Cottoidei of Perciformes. It is a glacial relict, native to a limited number of deep, cold lakes in Canada and the United States.

== Taxonomy ==
The deepwater sculpin was first described in 1851 by Charles Frédéric Girard under the name Triglopsis thompsonii. The description was based on specimens obtained by Spencer Fullerton Baird for the Smithsonian Institution from the stomachs of burbot (Lota lota) caught by anglers on Lake Ontario. The name Triglopsis referred to its resemblance to the piper gurnard (Trigla lyra). The specific epithet honored fellow naturalist Rev. Zadock Thompson of Burlington, Vermont.

The deepwater sculpin is morphologicallly and ecologically similar to the fourhorn sculpin (Myoxocephalus quadricornis), an Arctic and Eurasian species, and it was often considered to be a subspecies (Myoxocephalus quadricornis thompsonii). Other authors maintained it as a separate species within the same genus (Myoxocephalus thompsonii). Mitochondrial DNA analysis supported the view that the two species were distinct and that the deepwater sculpin evolved from the fourhorn sculpin during the early Pleistocene era.

== Description ==
The deepwater sculpin is a small fish on average between 51–76 millimetres (2.0–3.0 in) in total length. Its body is generally flattened in shape and tapers from the head to the caudal peduncle. It does not have true scales but some spines are present on the opercle, body, and fins. The skin is mottled green, gray and brown on the back and whitish underneath. The deepwater sculpin can be distinguished from other freshwater sculpins in its range by a distinct gap between the two dorsal fins. It is most similar in appearance to the fourhorn sculpin, a fish found in salt and brackish water in the arctic but lacks the four bony spines found on the head of that species. Age estimation with otoliths suggests that deepwater sculpin can live up to nine years.

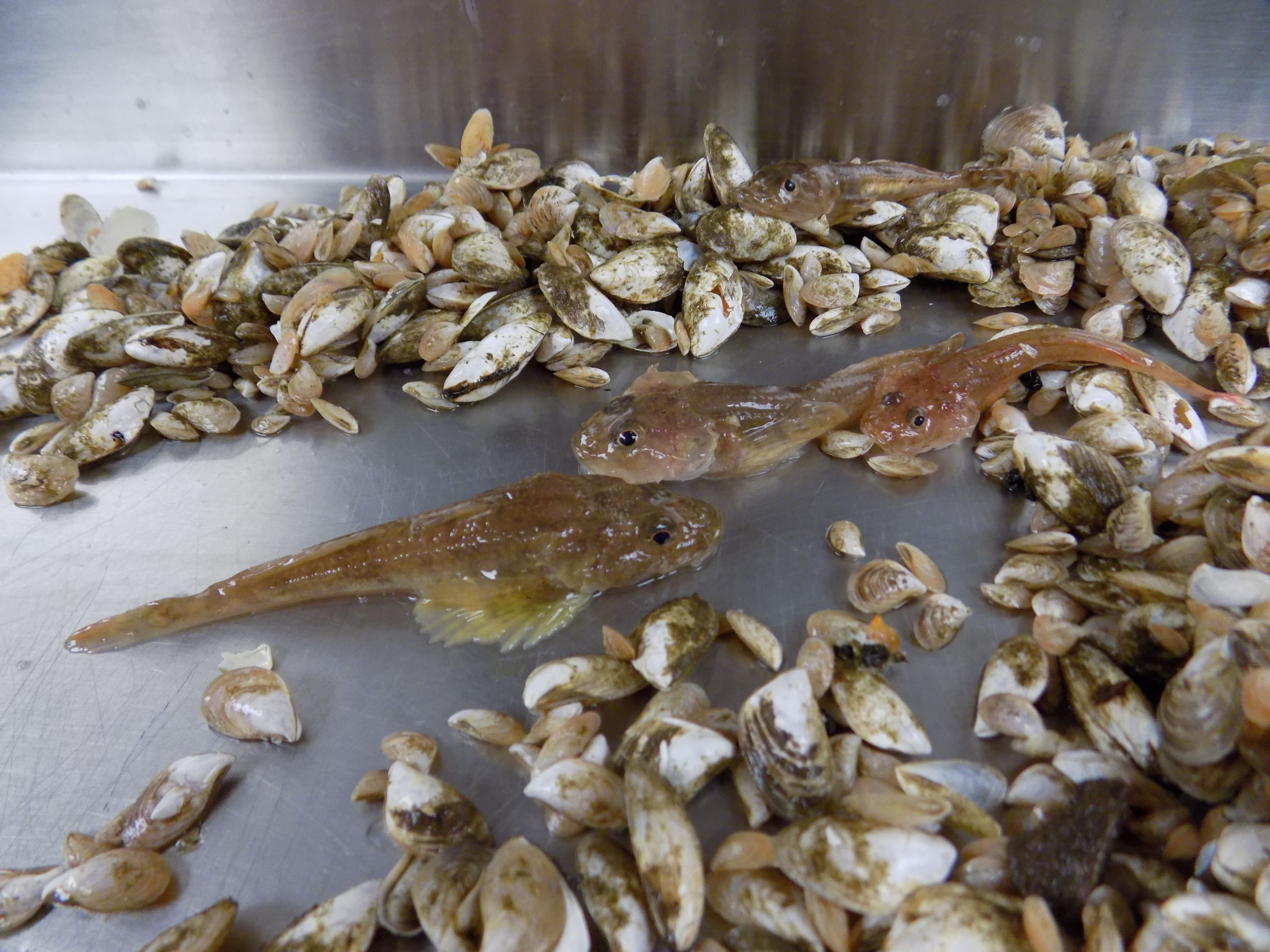
Deepwater sculpin collected in a benthic trawl on board the United States Geological Survey R/V Sturgeon offshore of Grand Haven, Michigan.

== Distribution and habitat ==
The deepwater sculpin is found from the Gatineau through the Laurentian Great Lakes, Manitoba, and Saskatchewan to the Great Slave and Great Bear Lakes. It is also found in Waterton Lake within Waterton Lakes National Park and Glacier National Park. Within its range, it is limited to deep, well-oxygenated lakes with ties to former Wisconsinan glacial lakes or the Champlain Sea.

The deepwater sculpin inhabits the demersal zone. It prefers water temperatures that remain less than 5 °C (41 °F). In lakes in the southern part of its range, it has been observed only in deep water where temperature remains cold annually.

== Diet ==
The deepwater sculpin feeds primarily on small crustaceans Mysis diluviana and Diporeia. They will also take chironomid larvae. Zooplankton are likely prey at the larval stage.

== Reproduction ==
Spawning of deepwater sculpin is poorly described, but evaluations of gonadal development suggests that spawning consists of a singular event over a prolonged period in Lake Ontario. Deepwater sculpin eggs hatch from November to August, peaking in March. Larvae are initially pelagic, staying in the water column above the reach of their adults. Beginning in July, larvae that have grown to 2 centimetres (0.79 in) go through metamorphosis and settle to the bottom. Fish are thought to reach maturity at three years for females and two years for males.

== Management ==
The deepwater sculpin is classified as of Least Concern by the IUCN based on the apparent stability populations globally. In Canada, it is considered a species at risk under the Species at Risk Act. Current threats include habitat loss, lake eutrophication, invasive species, and water pollution.

Although not directly used by humans, deepwater sculpin are a significant food source for other fish including lake trout (Salvelinus namaycush) and burbot. They are also an intermediate host for the parasites Bothriocephalus cuspidatus, and Proteocephalus sp. which are found in crustaceans they consume and other fish that prey upon them. The deepwater sculpin is also an indicator species for deepwater lake communities where it occurs. It is considered a model organism to those interested in zoogeography.
