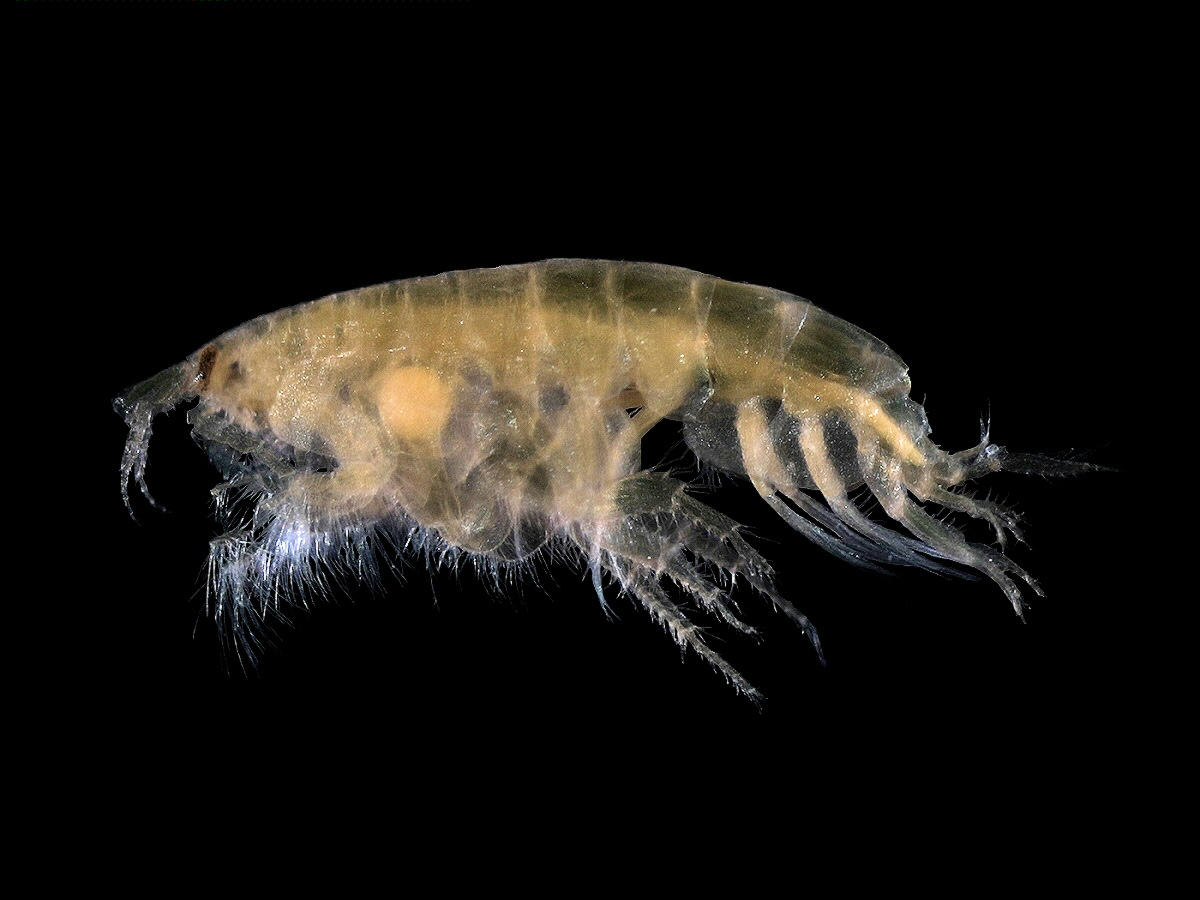
- Bathyporeia elegans with an egg in its marsupium (brood pouch).

Scientific classification
- Domain: Eukaryota
- Kingdom: Animalia
- Phylum: Arthropoda
- Class: Malacostraca
- Order: Amphipoda
- Family: Pontoporeiidae
- Genus: Bathyporeia
- Species: B. elegans

Binomial name
- Bathyporeia elegans Watkin, 1938

= Bathyporeia elegans =

Species of crustacean

Bathyporeia elegans is a species of amphipod crustacean in the genus Bathyporeia which occurs in the northeastern Atlantic Ocean. It is unpigmented, and grows up to 6 millimetres (0.24 in) long.

== Description ==
Bathyporeia elegans is a translucent, laterally-flattened sand-digger shrimp up to 6 millimetres (0.24 in) long. The head bears two pairs of antennae, four pairs of feeding appendages and a pair of large red eyes. The basal segments of the first pair of antennae are rectangular with feather-like chaetae on the ventral surface; several smaller segments extend from the base forming a zigzag, and the antenna is tipped by a flagellum, with five to six segments in females and nine to eleven segments in males. The second pair of antennae have five segments and in females, are tipped by an eight to ten-segmented flagellum, and are twice as long as the first pair. In males, the second pair of antennae have filiform flagella which extend the whole length of the body.

== Distribution and habitat ==
Bathyporeia elegans occurs in the north-eastern Atlantic Ocean, the Irish Sea, the North Sea and the English Channel. Its range extends from northern Norway along the European coast as far south as North Africa, Madeira and the Canary Islands. It is typically found in fine to medium-grain sand and muddy sand at depths between about 25 to 100 m (80 to 330 ft).

== Ecology ==
Animals with which this sand shrimp is often associated in the North Sea include the bivalve mollusc Abra prismatica and various polychaete worms. The brittlestar Amphiura filiformis and the cumacean crustacean Eudorellopsis deformis may also be present in the habitat.
