= Beaufort Sea =

Marginal sea of the Arctic Ocean

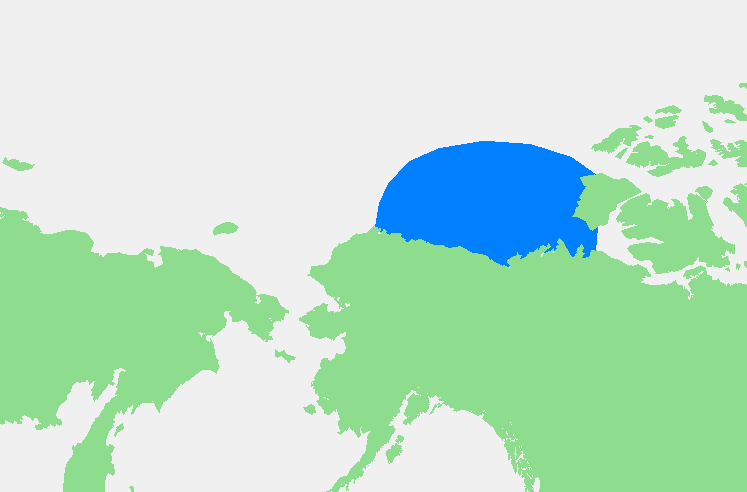

- Location within North America
- Coordinates: 72°N 137°W
- Type: Sea
- Basin countries: Canada and United States
- Surface area: 476,000 km^{2} (184,000 sq mi)
- Average depth: 124 m (407 ft)
- Max. depth: 4,683 m (15,364 ft)
- Water volume: 22,000 km^{3} (1.8×10^{10} acre⋅ft)
- Frozen: Almost all year round

The Beaufort Sea (/ˈboʊfərt/ BOH-fərt; French: Mer de Beaufort) is a marginal sea of the Arctic Ocean, located north of the Northwest Territories, Yukon, and Alaska, and west of the Canadian Arctic Archipelago. The sea is named after Sir Francis Beaufort, a hydrographer. The Mackenzie River, the longest in Canada, empties into the Canadian part of the Beaufort Sea west of Tuktoyaktuk, which is one of the few permanent settlements on the sea's shores.

The sea, characterized by a severe climate, is frozen over most of the year. Historically, only a narrow pass up to 100 km (62 mi) opened in August–September near its shores, but recently due to climate change in the Arctic the ice-free area in late summer has greatly enlarged. Until recently, the Beaufort Sea was known as an important reservoir for the replenishment of Arctic sea ice. Sea ice would often rotate for several years in the Beaufort Gyre, the dominant ocean current of the Beaufort Sea, growing into sturdy and thick multi-year ice.

Claims that the seacoast was populated about 30,000 years ago have been largely discredited (see below); present population density is very low. The sea contains significant resources of petroleum and natural gas under its shelf, such as the Amauligak field. They were discovered in the period between the 1950s and 1980s, and since the latter part of that period their exploration has become the major human activity in the area. The traditional occupations of fishing and whale and seal hunting are practiced only locally, and have no commercial significance. As a result, the sea hosts one of the largest colonies of beluga whales and, as of 2016, such hunting of the species in the eastern Beaufort Sea was considered sustainable. To prevent overfishing in its waters, the US adopted a precautionary commercial fisheries management plan in August 2009. In April 2011, the Canadian government signed a memorandum of understanding with the Inuvialuit as a first step in developing a larger ocean management plan. The Canadian government announced in October 2014 that no new commercial fisheries in the Beaufort Sea will be considered until research has shown sustainable stocks that would be made available to Inuvialuit first.

The Canadian government designated blocks of the Beaufort Sea as Marine Protected Areas (MPAs). The Anguniaqvia niqiqyuam MPA surrounds the Parry Peninsula in the Amundsen Gulf, and the Tarium Niryutait MPA is located at the Mackenzie River delta and estuary. The protected areas are set to protect species and habitats for the Inuvialuit community.

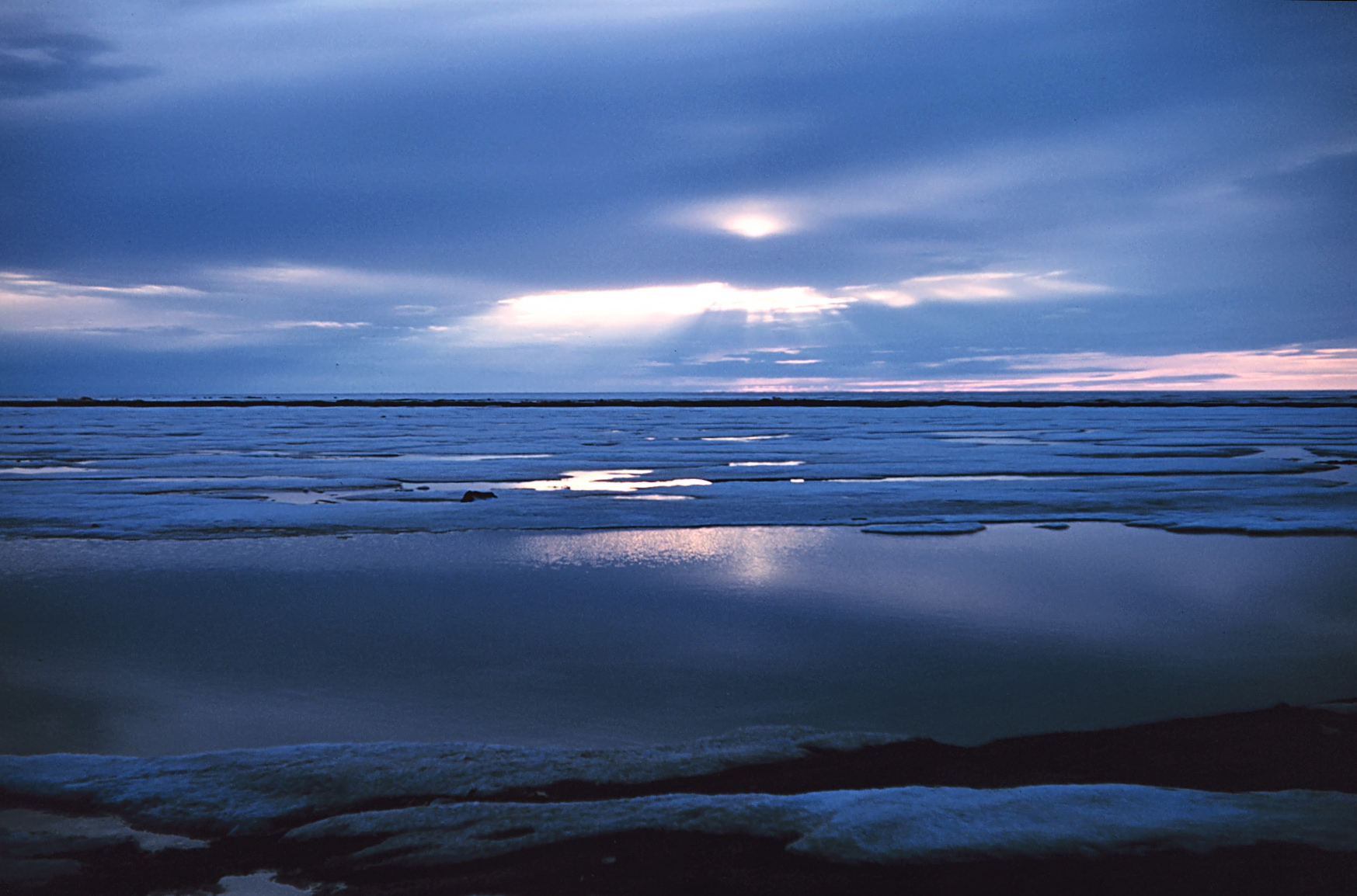
Melting ice in the Beaufort Sea

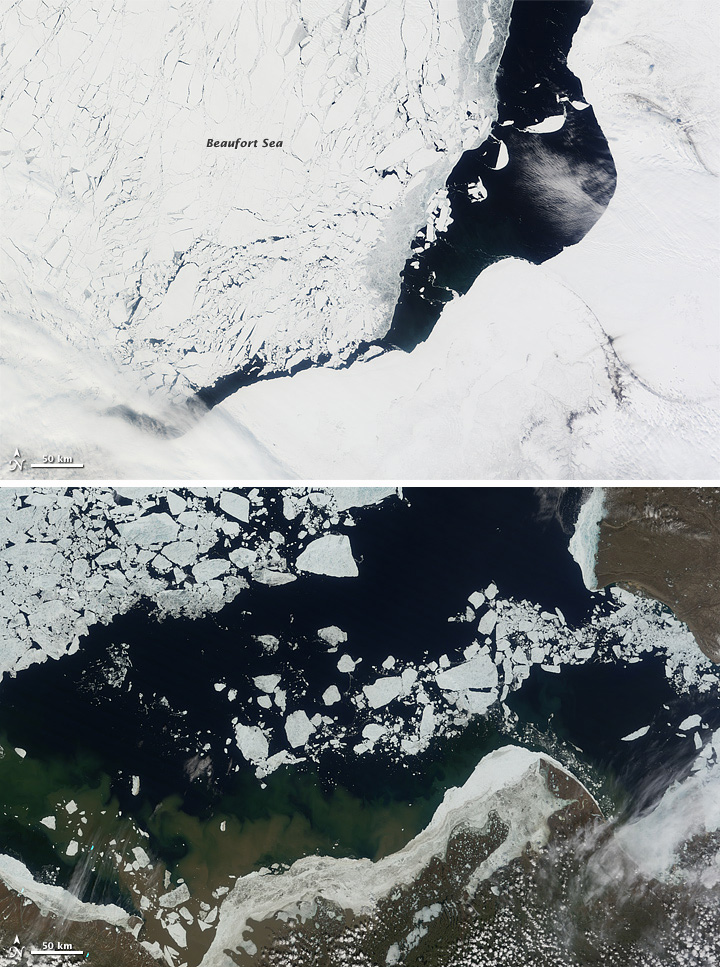
Sea Ice Retreat in the Beaufort Sea

== Extent ==
The International Hydrographic Organization defines the limits of the Beaufort Sea as follows:

On the North. A line from Point Barrow, Alaska, to Lands End, Prince Patrick Island (76°16′N 124°08′W).

On the East. From Lands End through the Southwest coast of Prince Patrick Island to Griffiths Point, thence a line to Cape Prince Alfred, the Northwestern extreme of Banks Island, through its West coast to Cape Kellet, the Southwestern point, and thence a line to Cape Bathurst on the mainland (70°36′N 127°32′W).

=== Border dispute ===
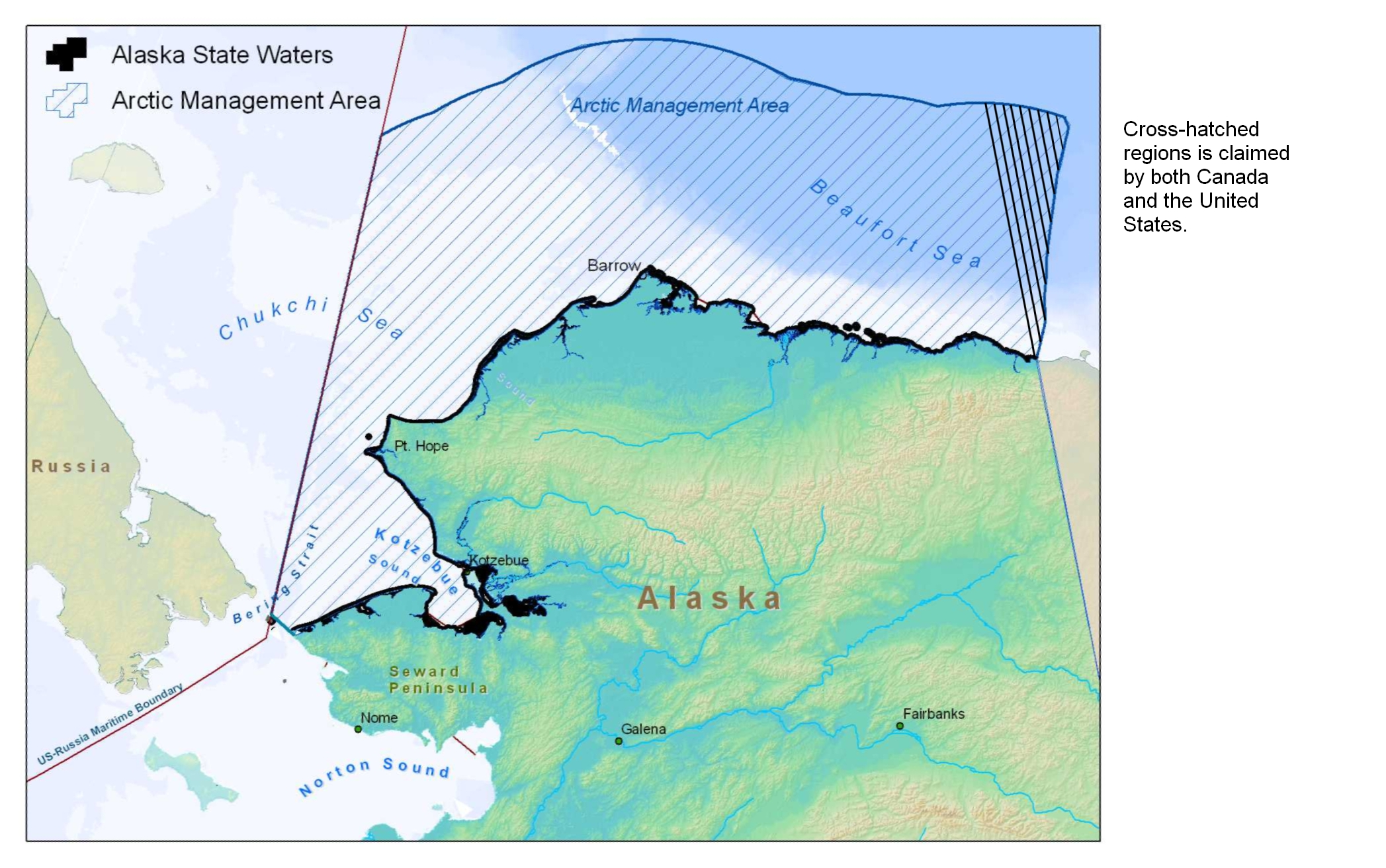
The cross-hatched wedge-shaped region in the east is claimed by both Canada and the US

There is an unresolved dispute involving a wedge-shaped slice on the International Boundary in the Beaufort Sea, between the Canadian territory of Yukon and the U.S. state of Alaska. Canada claims the maritime boundary to be along the 141st meridian west out to a distance of 200 nmi (370 km; 230 mi), following the Alaska–Yukon land border. This follows the natural prolongation principle, which holds that a nation's maritime boundary should reflect the 'natural prolongation' of where its land territory reaches the coast. The position of the United States is that the boundary line should be perpendicular to the coast out to a distance of 200 nmi (370 km; 230 mi), following a line of equidistance from the coast. The equidistance principle argues that a nation's maritime boundaries should conform to a median line that is equidistant from the shores of neighbouring nations. This difference creates a wedge with an area of about 21,000 km^{2} (8,100 sq mi) that is claimed by both nations.

Canada's position has its roots in the Treaty of Saint Petersburg (1825) between the United Kingdom and the Russian Empire that set the boundary between the two. Canada is the successor state to Great Britain in relation to this treaty, which stipulates:

the line of demarcation shall follow the summit of the mountains situated parallel to the Coast, as far as the point of intersection of the 141st degree of West longitude […] and, finally, from the said point of intersection, the said Meridian Line of the 141st degree, in its prolongation as far as the Frozen Ocean

— Article 3, Convention between Great Britain and Russia concerning the Limits of their Respective Possessions on the North-West Coast of America and the Navigation of the Pacific Ocean, 1825-02-16, 75 CTS 95

Canada maintains that this treaty is extensible from the land into the Beaufort Sea along the meridian. The United States rejects this extension and instead asserts a boundary line based upon equidistance, although its position is somewhat undermined by its acceptance in 1867 of similar treaty wording and a similar interpretation under the treaty whereby it acquired Alaska. Both the U.S. and Canada agree that they are bound by the 1958 Convention on the Continental Shelf; and they both agree that the boundary should be "equitable", as determined by the International Court of Justice. They differ on what should be deemed "equitable". The U.S. contends that "equidistance is an appropriate principle for determining a maritime boundary where there are no special circumstances in the area and when equidistance results in a boundary in accordance with equitable principles". Canada contends that an equidistance principle does not result in an equitable boundary, because distortion would occur. The coast of Yukon is concave, whereas the coast of Alaska is convex; and thus an equidistance principle would result in a significant extension of the U.S. possession. This dispute has taken on increased significance due to the possible presence of natural reserves within the wedge, which according to Canada's National Energy Board may contain 1.7 billion cubic metres (60 billion cubic feet) of gas, which would cover the national consumption for 20 years, and more than 1 billion cubic metres (6.3 billion barrels) of oil. Because of this, Canada argues that "special circumstances" apply to this border, a position that the U.S. rejects. This dispute is in this respect a mirror image of the dispute between the U.S. and Canada over the Gulf of Maine, where the U.S. argued for "special circumstances" and Canada argued for the equidistance principle. (In that latter dispute, both of those arguments were rejected, and the border was drawn based upon geometric principles taking into account geographic factors.) Neither the U.S. nor Canada has pressed for a swift resolution for the matter, or arbitration at the International Court of Justice, however; and the two have in the meantime cooperated in several measures aimed at preserving the maritime environment.

Before the end of 2004, the US leased eight plots of land below the water for oil exploration and exploitation, provoking a diplomatic protest from Canada. On 20 August 2009, United States Secretary of Commerce Gary Locke announced a moratorium on commercial fishing of the Beaufort Sea north of Alaska, including the disputed waters. In July 2010, US–Canada negotiations have started in Ottawa with the next meeting planned in 2011. A joint geological survey of the area has been initiated, and the issue was marked as settled by the CIA World Factbook, though no official document has been released by September 2010.

=== Moratorium on commercial fishing ===
On August 20, 2009 United States Secretary of Commerce Gary Locke announced a moratorium on fishing the Beaufort Sea north of Alaska. According to Locke:

As Arctic sea ice recedes due to climate change, there is increasing interest in commercial fishing in Arctic waters. We are in a position to plan for sustainable fishing that does not damage the overall health of this fragile ecosystem. This plan takes a precautionary approach to any development of commercial fishing in an area where there has been none in the past.

There is no widespread commercial fisheries in those waters now.

The moratorium was imposed in anticipation that global warming would make those waters accessible to commercial fisheries. The moratorium stirred controversy in Canada because the region where the USA announced the moratorium included a large wedge-shaped region of disputed waters. Randy Boswell, of Canada.com wrote that the disputed area covered a 21,436 square kilometres (8,276 mi^{2}) section of the Beaufort Sea. He wrote that Canada had filed a "diplomatic note" with the US in April when the USA first announced plans for the moratorium. Jack Layton, leader of the New Democratic Party of Canada, called the U.S. moratorium over the disputed waters in the Beaufort Sea the "largest encroachment on Canadian territory in our history."

== Geography ==
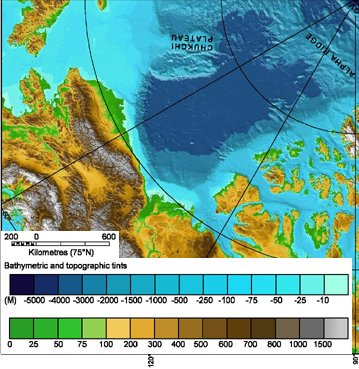
Topography of the Beaufort Sea area.

Several rivers such as the Kongakut River in Alaska and the Firth River in Yukon empty into the Beaufort. The major river to flow into the sea is the Mackenzie, Canada's longest, which empties into the Canadian part of the sea, west of Tuktoyaktuk. The coastal shelf area is rather narrow, especially near and east of Point Barrow in the Alaskan part of the sea, and contains numerous submarine valleys. It becomes wider near the delta of the Mackenzie River but nowhere exceeds 145 km (90 mi). Near the coast, the depths are shallower than 60 m (200 ft) but they rapidly increase northwards up to a few kilometers, transforming into a massive platform which is geologically similar to that of the oceans. There are many small islands in the sea and in the delta of the Mackenzie River. A few larger ones lie west of the Mackenzie River, such as Herschel Island (4 km (2.5 mi) off the shore, area 18 km^{2} (6.9 sq mi)) and Barter Island (0.3 km (0.19 mi) from the coast, area 13 km^{2} (5.0 sq mi)). The coasts are low, with the maximum elevations between 250 and 750 m (820 and 2,460 ft). The soil is frozen all year around at the depth below about 1 m (3 ft 3 in) or less, forming permafrost, and only the top few tens of centimeters thaws in summer. Consequently, buildings have to be elevated above ground on wooden piles that are immersed into the permafrost.

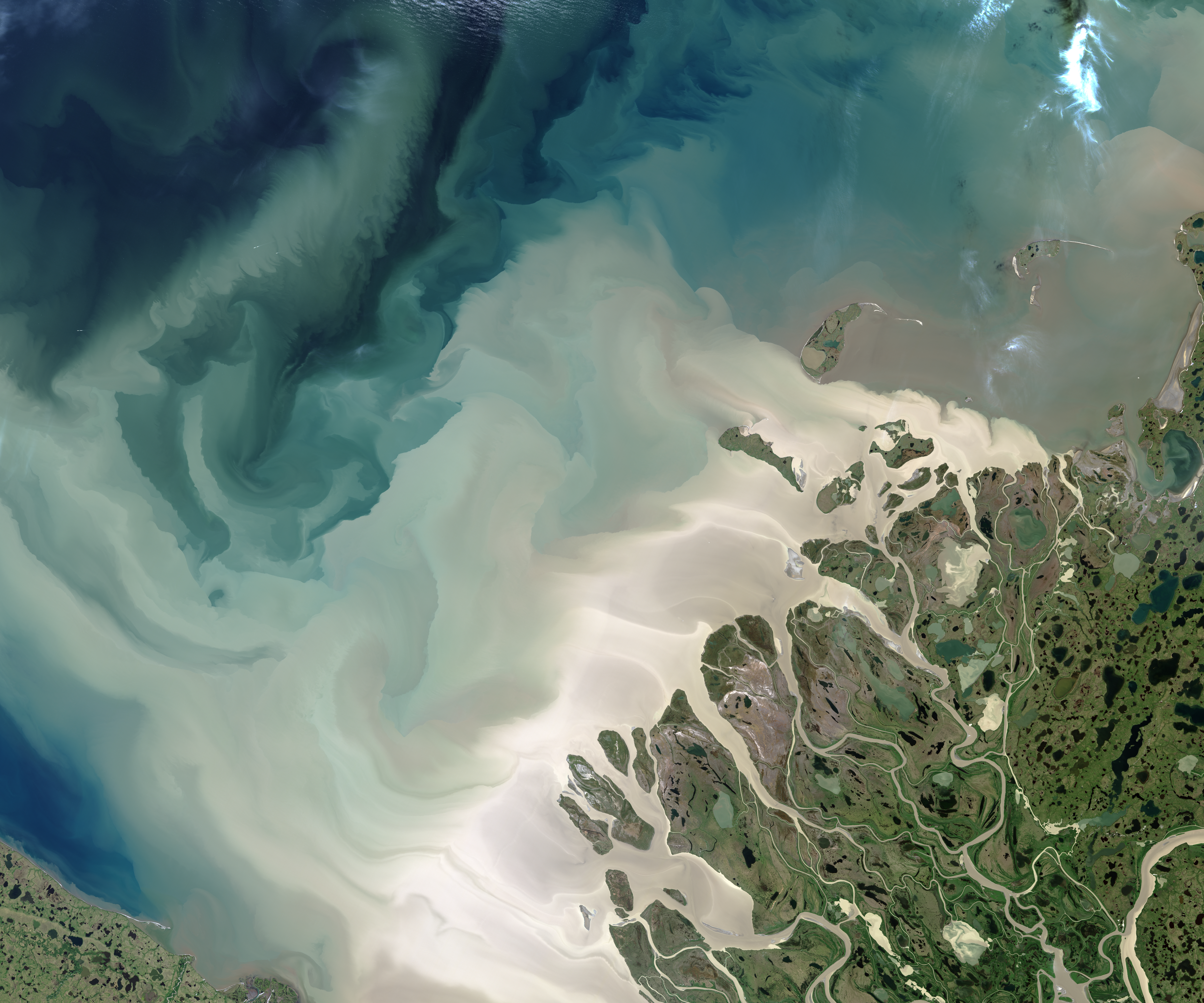
Mackenzie river enters Beaufort sea

== Hydrology and climate ==
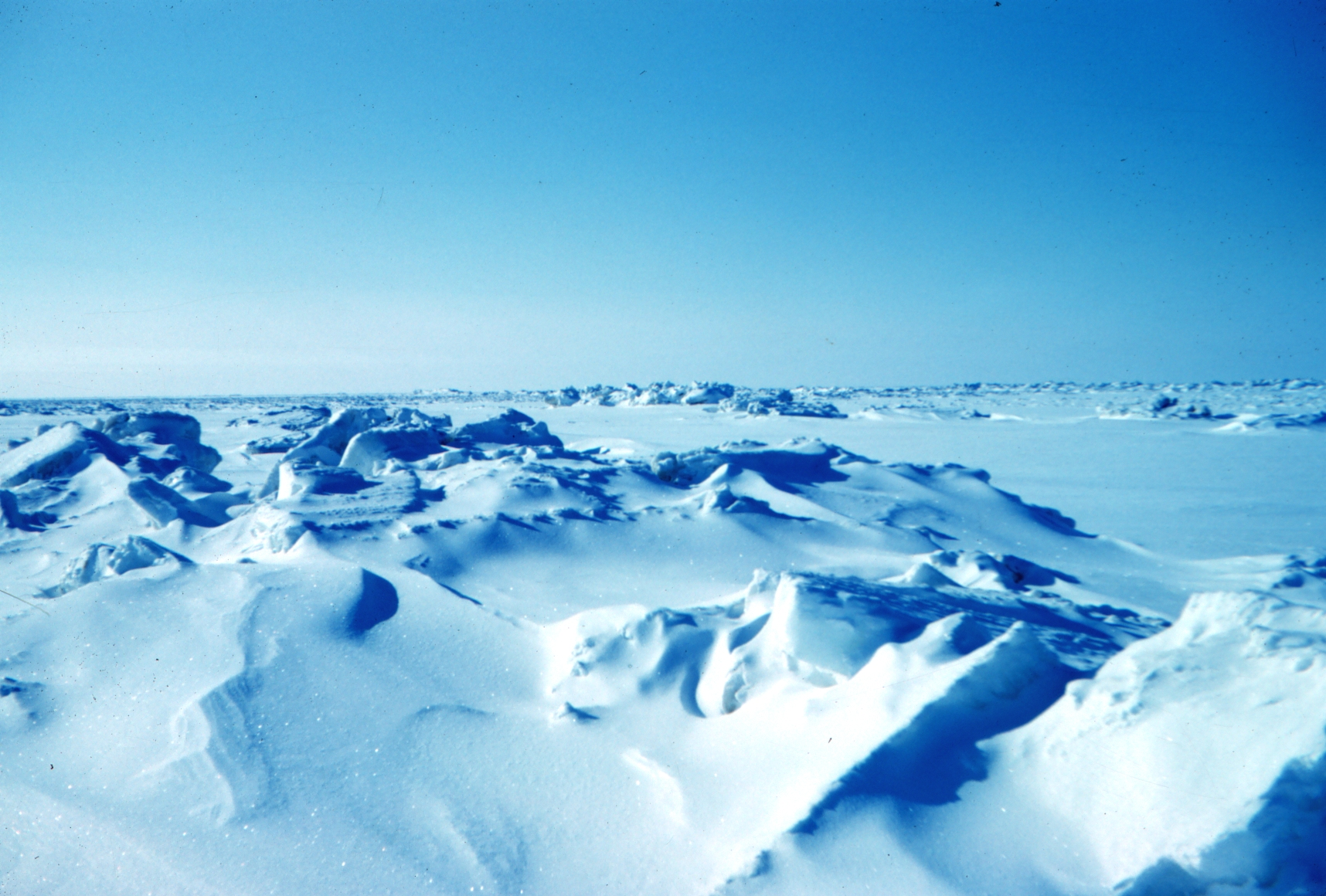
Sea ice pressure ridges in the Beaufort Sea off the northern coast of Alaska (spring 1949).

The Beaufort Sea is frozen over through the year, except for August and September when the ice breaks near the coast and opens what was once a 50–100 km (31–62 mi) wide strip of open water. During the 2000s, due to climate change in the Arctic, the ice-free area in late summer greatly enlarged. During the record minimum extent of Arctic sea ice in September, 2012, the sea ice boundary had retreated northward much farther than normal from the coast.

The channels of the Mackenzie River thaw earlier, in late May–early June. This thawing increases the average water discharge from about 150,000 to 250,000 m^{3}/s (5,300,000 to 8,800,000 cu ft/s).

Hidden changes in the ice cover of the Beaufort Sea were discovered in 2009. Whereas the ice area remain stable, as detected by the observation satellites, so as the associated water temperature and salinity, the ice structure has changed recently. The new ice, called rotten ice, is thinner and much weaker structurally.

The sea water has a stable temperature and is separated into four distinct layers as follows. The top 100 m (330 ft) are surface water which has a temperature of −1.4 °C (29.5 °F) in summer and −1.8 °C (28.8 °F) in winter. The next layer is formed by the inflows from the Pacific Ocean and Bering Sea coming through the Bering Strait; it extends up to the North Pole. The warmest, deep Atlantic layer has the temperatures between 0 and 1 °C (32 and 34 °F), and water at the bottom is a bit colder at −0.4 to −0.8 °C (31.3 to 30.6 °F). The average salinity varies between 28‰ and 32‰ (parts per thousand) from south to north. Typical air temperatures (at Tuktoyaktuk) are −27 °C (−17 °F) in January and 11 °C (52 °F) in July.

The water currents form the clockwise-directed Beaufort Gyre, that results in south-westerly and westerly currents near the shores. The Mackenzie River partly affects this circulation inducing minor eastwards streams near its mouth. The river annually brings about 15 million tonnes of sediments which are rich in dolomite and calcium carbonate. Those deposits are spread over the sea and mixed with mud and gravel.

== Flora and fauna ==
=== Terrestrial ecosystem ===
The shoreline of the Beaufort Sea is characterized by arctic tundra vegetation. The Mackenzie River delta contains numerous lakes and ponds which provide habitat for muskrat, whales and seabirds.

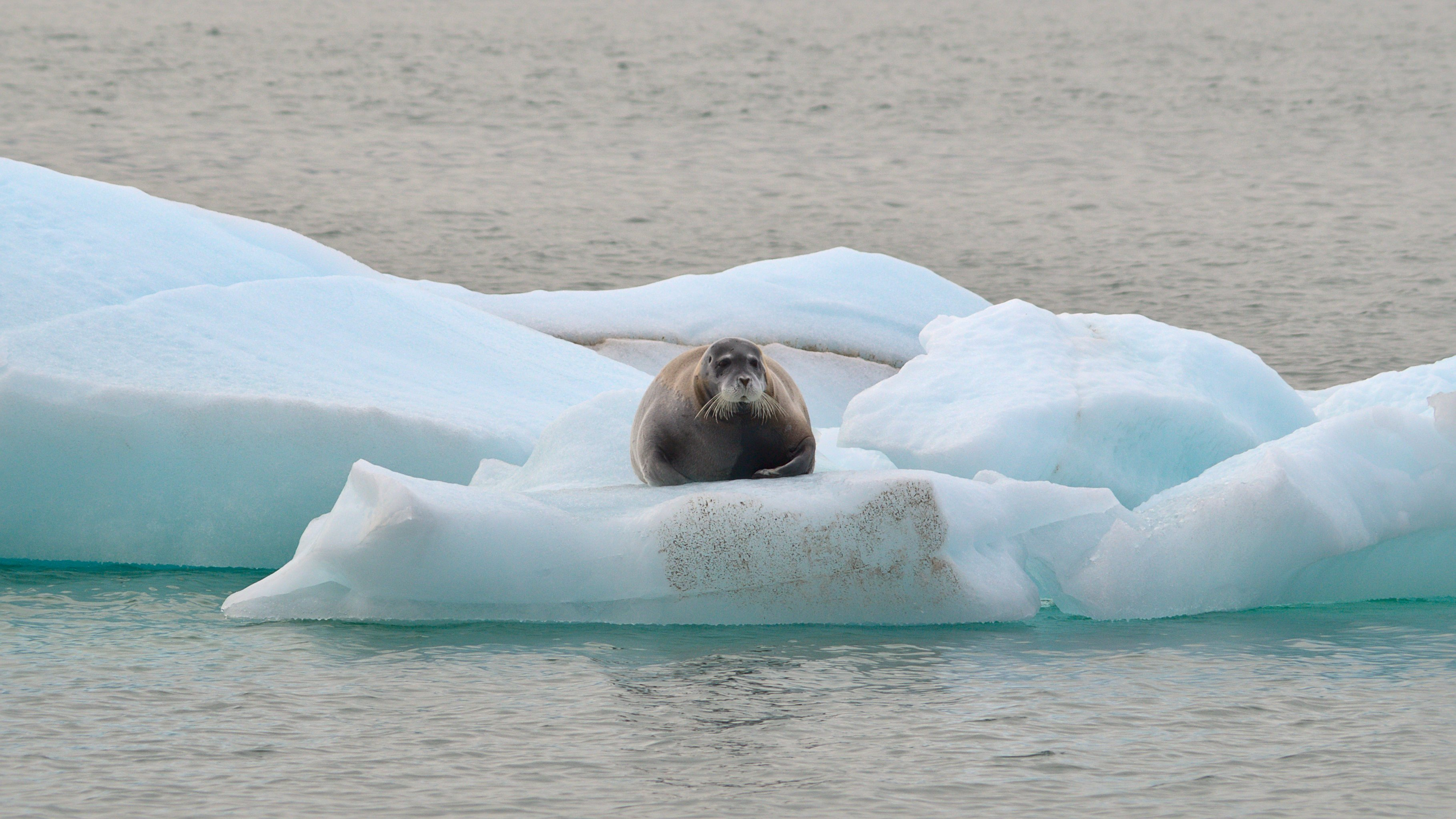
Bearded seal

=== Marine biodiversity ===
The Beaufort sea hosts about 80 species of zooplankton, more than 70 species of phytoplankton, and nearly 700 species of polychaetes, bryozoans, crustaceans and mollusks, but their total volume is relatively small owing to the cold climate. Major fish species include polar cod (Boreogadus saida), Arctic cod (Arctogadus glacialis), saffron cod (Eleginus gracilis), Arctic char (Salvelinus alpinus), chum salmon (Oncorhynchus keta), Arctic cisco (Coregonus autumnalis), least cisco (Coregonus sardinella), lake whitefish (Coregonus clupeaformis), broad whitefish (Coregonus nasus), Pacific herring (Clupea pallasii), fourhorn sculpin (Myoxocephalus quadricornis), inconnu (Stenodus leucichthys) and flatfish.

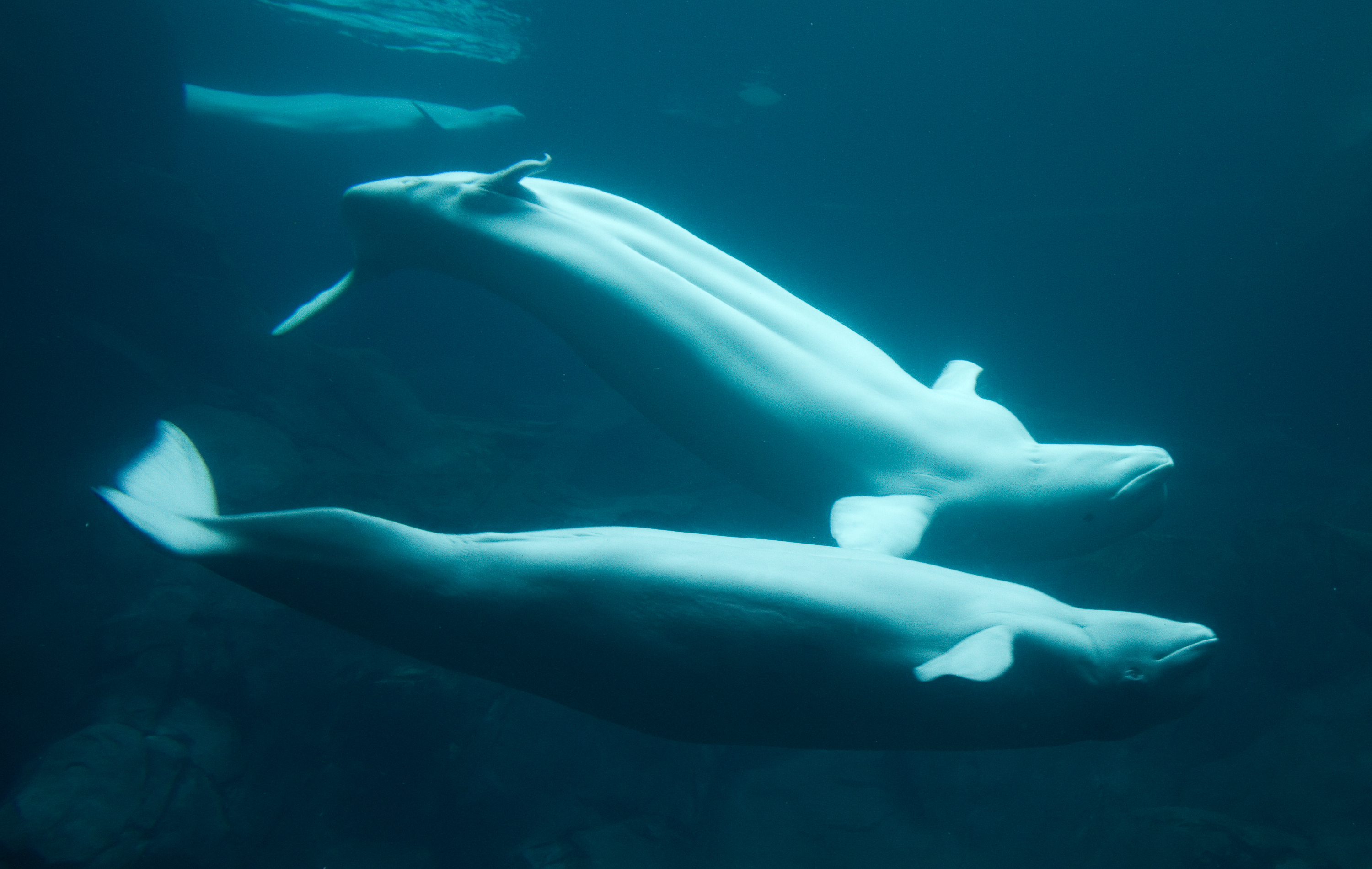
Beluga whales

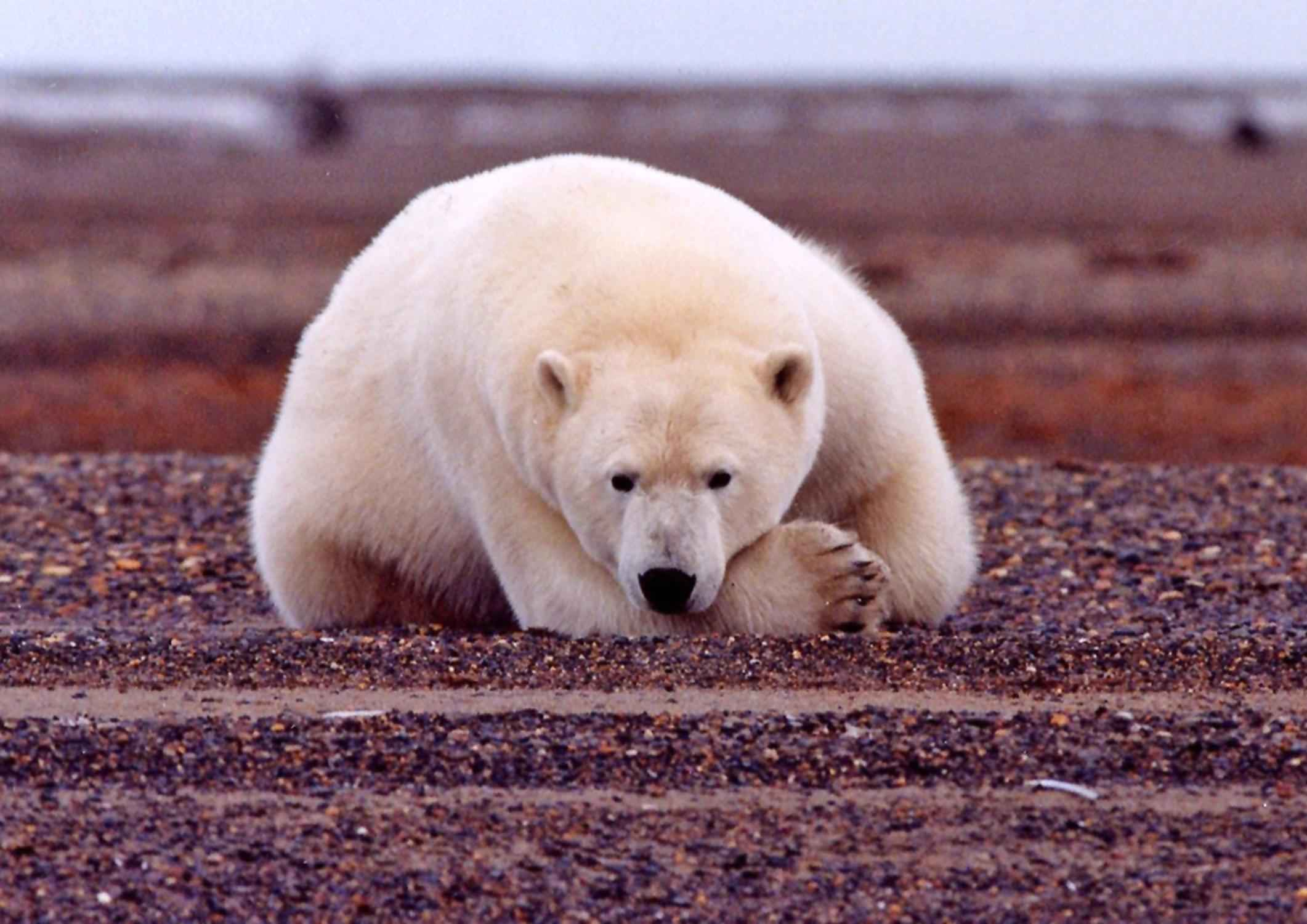
Polar bear at the coast of the Beaufort Sea

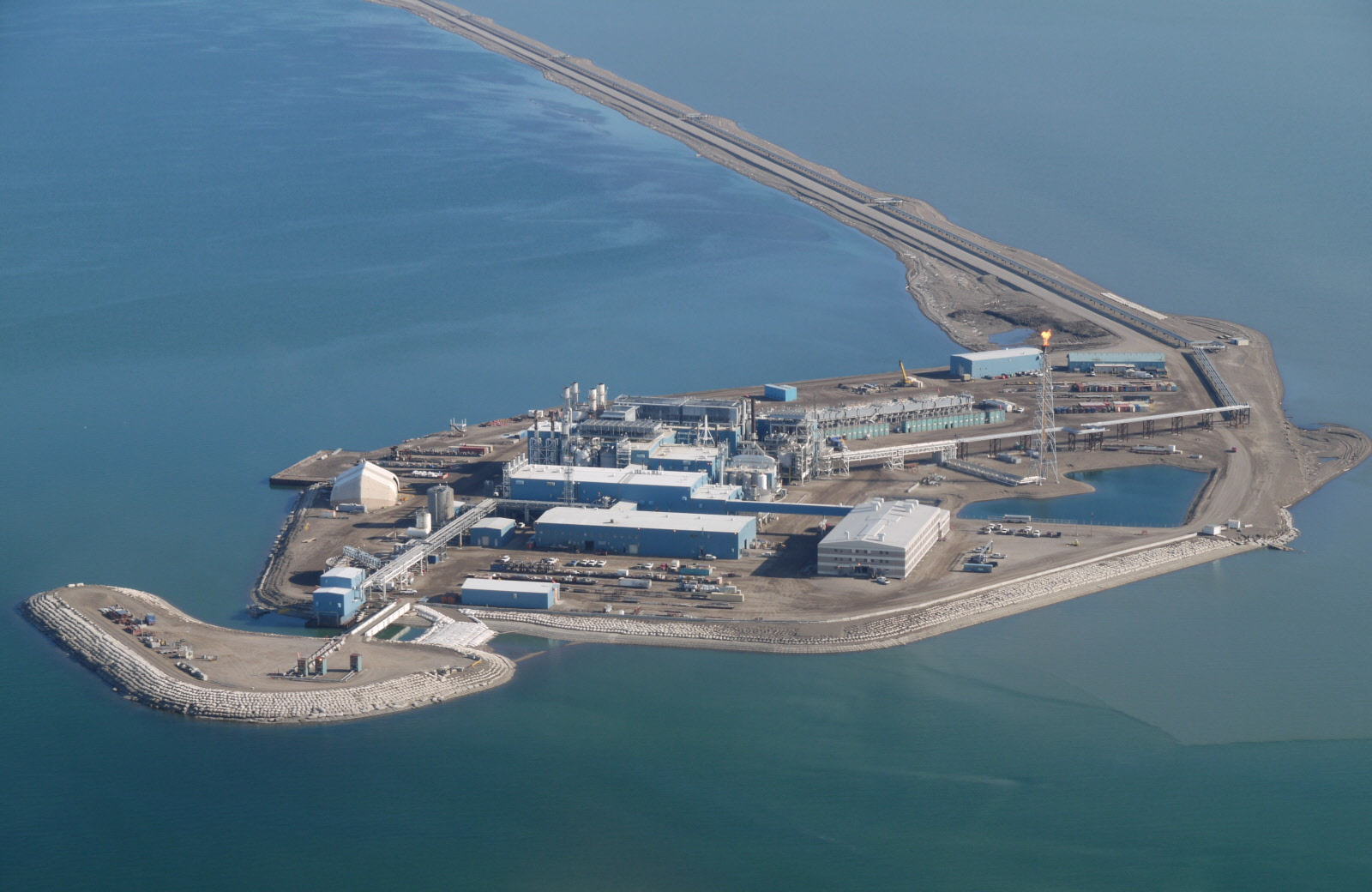
Endicott Island

=== Beluga whales ===
The eastern part of the Beaufort sea is a major habitat of beluga whales (Delphinapterus leucas) with an estimated population of 39,000. This population is stable and might even be increasing; it does not appear to be affected by the offshore oil exploration in the area. The Eastern Beaufort stock of belugas spends summer in the Mackenzie Estuary, Viscount Melville Sound, Amudsen Gulf, and beyond. Whales tend to occupy the Mackenzie Estuary only intermittently and for a few days at a time, spending much of their time offshore near or beyond the shelf break and in the polar pack ice. In winter, they migrate long distances to the Bering Sea. Genetic analyses have confirmed that belugas of the Beaufort Sea are clearly distinct from those of other Canadian and Alaskan waters, despite often sharing a common wintering habitat.

=== Polar bears ===
The Beaufort Sea provides essential habitat for two distinct polar bear (Ursus maritimus) subpopulations. The Northern Beaufort Sea population, estimated at 980 bears, inhabits areas adjacent to the northwestern islands of the Canadian Arctic Archipelago, including Banks Island and surrounding waters, where sea ice converges throughout most of the year. The Southern Beaufort Sea population, which declined by approximately 40% during the 2000s to roughly 900 bears, ranges from northern Alaska eastward along the Canadian coast.

Both populations strongly prefer sea ice over the shallow continental shelf (less than 300 meters depth), where biological productivity and seal densities are highest, providing critical hunting grounds particularly during spring and early summer when bearded seal (Erignatus barbatus) and ringed seal (Pusa hispida) are most accessible. The coastal regions of the Beaufort Sea serve as important maternal denning habitat, with pregnant females entering dens in October–November and emerging with cubs in March–April.

=== Food web structure ===
The food chain of the Beaufort Sea is relatively simple: It starts with phytoplankton and epontic algae (single-cell algae associated with the lower interface of sea ice), which provide energy to zooplankton, and epontic and coastal amphipods. The latter serve as a food for seabirds and fish, primarily as polar cod and Arctic char. Polar cod is a major food of Arctic char, beluga, narwhal, seabirds and seals, which are dominated by the bearded seal and ringed seal. Bearded seal and walrus also feed on benthic invertebrates. On top of the food pyramid stands the polar bear, which feeds primarily on seals, but also on any large marine mammals when it has a chance, such as carcasses and whales trapped in ice fields.

== Human activities ==
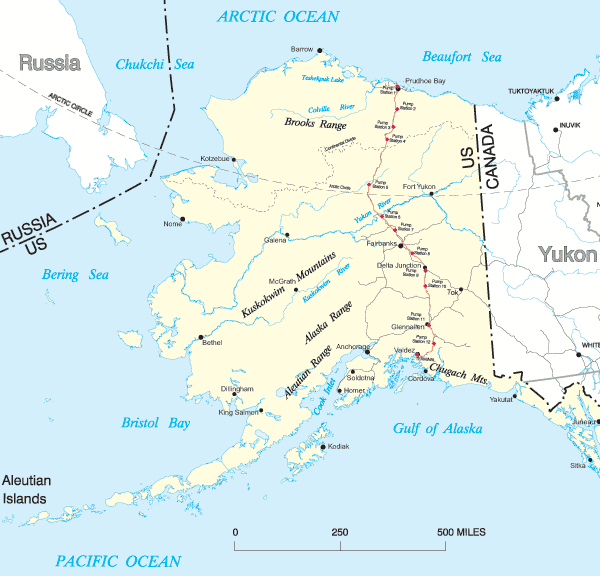
A map showing the Trans-Alaska Pipeline colored in red.

"There is only one proposed Early-Entry site in eastern Beringia that still has proponents, Bluefish Caves in the Porcupine River Basin, Yukon Territory, Canada. Claims of great antiquity in the area [e.g., 30kya] have a convoluted history. A caribou tibia flesher, the most diagnostic human implement from the Old Crow basin, had been dated at near 28 kya. When redated using accelerator mass spectrometry (AMS) of small amounts of remnant collagen the bone produced a 1.8 kya date (Yesner 1996b:255)". There is no evidence for anomalous occupation of Beaufort coasts in the context of Arctic cultures generally, including the arrival about 4,000 years ago by Paleo-Eskimos such as the Dorset culture, around 1,000 years ago by the Thule and finally by the modern Inuit. From early ages, they practiced fishing – bones of Arctic char were found at the 4,000 years old settlements. While originally they lived nomadic life, later, they started to form permanent settlements. Their population is increasing, but the unemployment rate is relatively high.

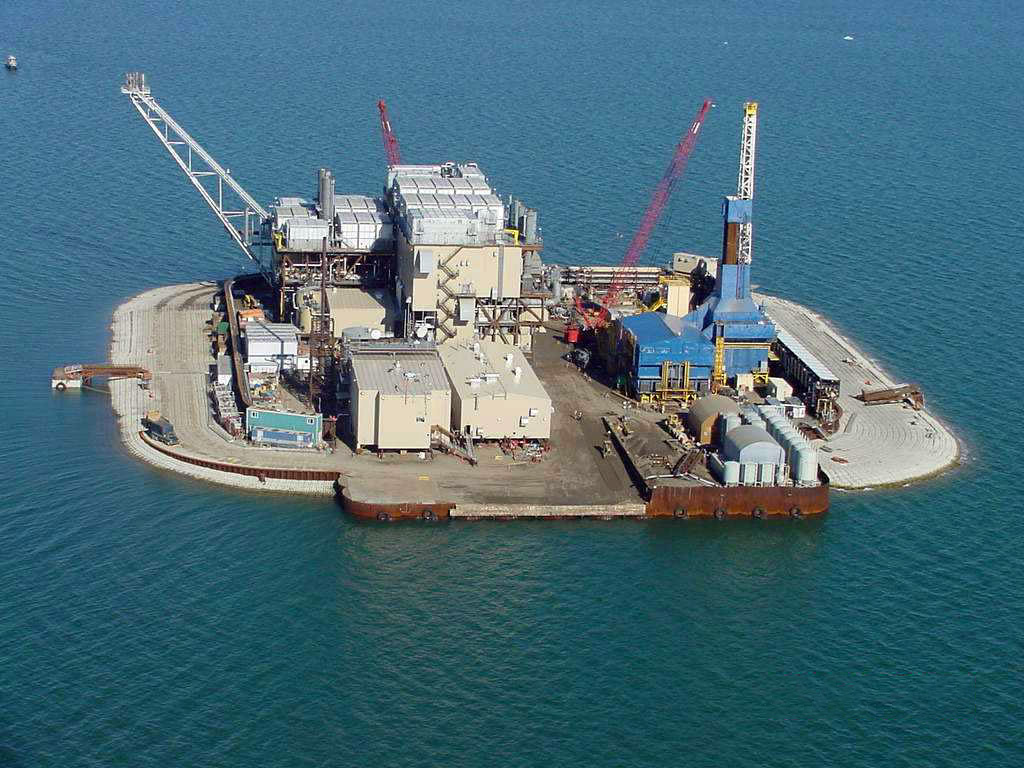
Northstar Island, an artificial island northwest of Prudhoe Bay, is a site of oil and gas drilling

Bowhead whales were hunted in the sea between 1888 and 1914. This practice stopped, first because of the decline in whale population and then because of government regulations, but resumed in the 1990s.

The major settlements along the Beaufort Sea are Tuktoyaktuk (population 930 in 2009) in Canada and Prudhoe Bay, Alaska. Although Prudhoe Bay is permanently populated by only a few people, there are thousands of contract workers in the area employed on petroleum production at the Prudhoe Bay Oil Field, which is on the coastal lowland known as the North Slope. Artificial islands, such as Endicott and Northstar, have been raised near the shores in 1987 and 2001, respectively. The crude oil is transported through the Trans-Alaska Pipeline System to the southern port of Valdez.

Fishing and sea hunting are practised by the local inhabitants and have no commercial value, especially after a US moratorium on commercial fishing of the Beaufort Sea, adopted in 2009. Trapping of muskrat at the Mackenzie River delta was the main source of income for the Athabaskan First Nations peoples and Inuit during 1920–1960, but has since declined.

== Oil and gas exploration ==
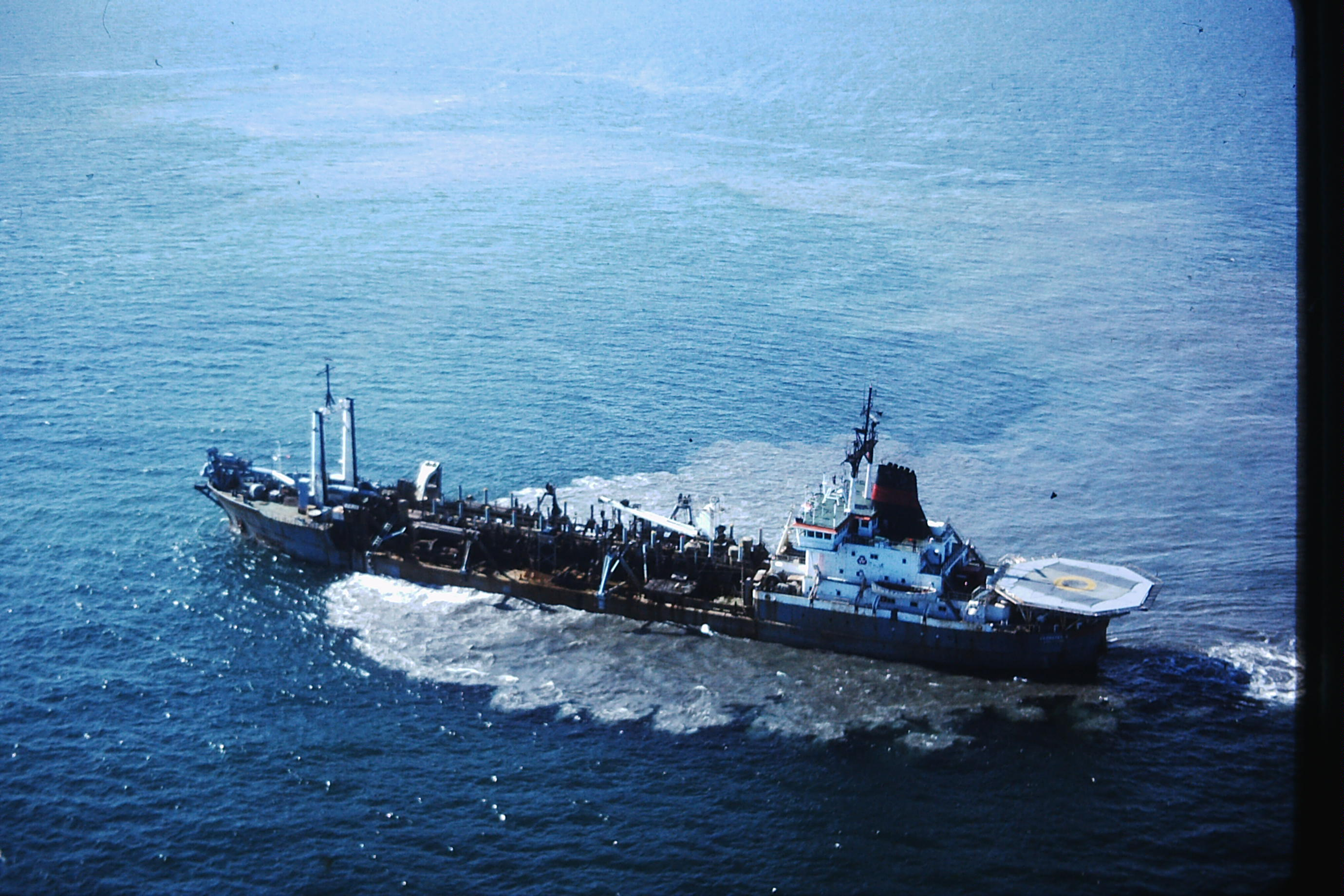
Dredger near Tuktoyaktuk on the Mackenzie River delta

The Beaufort Sea contains major gas and petroleum reserves beneath the seabed, a continuation of proven reserves in the nearby Mackenzie River and North Slope. The Beaufort Sea was first explored for sub-shelf hydrocarbons in the 1950s and estimated to contain about 250 km^{3} (60 cu mi) of oil and 300,000 km^{3} (72,000 cu mi) of natural gas under its coastal shelf. Offshore drilling began in 1972; about 70 wells were set up by the 1980s and 200 wells by 2000. These activities resulted in dredging of about 46.5 million m3 of sea bottom soil, as well as discharge of drilling muds which contained barite, clay, caustic soda, and heavy metals zinc, copper, lead, chromium, cobalt, nickel, cadmium and mercury. About 50,400 m^{3} (1,780,000 cu ft) of oil was produced in 1986.

A major gas field, named Taglu Gas Field, was discovered in the Mackenzie River delta in 1971, followed by the Parson Lake field and Niglintgak field. The estimated gas reserves of these fields are 58,600 km^{3} (14,100 cu mi), 35,400 and 13,600 km^{3} (8,500 and 3,300 cu mi), respectively. Moreover, further into the sea from the Mackenzie delta lies the Amauligak field. This, the largest known oil deposit of the Beaufort Sea, was discovered in 1984, and is estimated to contain 37.3 km^{3} (8.9 cu mi) of oil and 38,500 km^{3} (9,200 cu mi) of gas. The development of these fields is hindered by their remote location. This problem was alleviated for Prudhoe Bay by constructing the Trans-Alaska Pipeline, but is limiting regular commercial production at Mackenzie River deposits. For example, the Amauligak Project was started soon after the discovery of the field. In September 1985, the tanker Gulf Beaufort has transported 50,300,000 L (316,377 bbl) of crude oil to Japan, which was the first shipment of oil from the Arctic deposits. However, the project has stalled after that.

In July 2017, the U.S. Bureau of Ocean Energy Management approved a plan to allow Eni, an Italian multinational oil and gas company, to drill four oil exploration wells on Spy Island, one of four artificial islands in the Beaufort Sea.

== In popular culture ==
Stan Rogers references the Beaufort Sea in his popular Canadian Folk Song "Northwest Passage".

== See also ==
- Arctic policy of the United States
- Canadian Internal Waters
- List of areas disputed by Canada and the United States
- Northwest Passage
- Petroleum exploration in the Arctic

== Bibliography ==
- L. S. Parsons, William Henry Lear, National Research Council of Canada Perspectives on Canadian marine fisheries management, NRC Research Press, 1993 ISBN 0-660-15003-4
