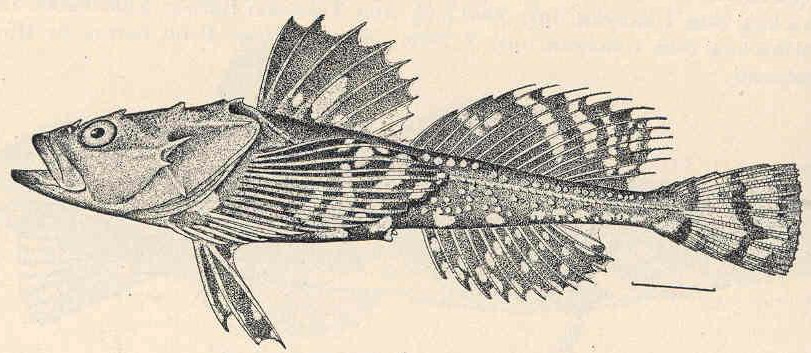
- Megalocottus platycephalus

Scientific classification
- Kingdom: Animalia
- Phylum: Chordata
- Class: Actinopterygii
- Order: Perciformes
- Suborder: Cottoidei
- Family: Psychrolutidae
- Genus: Megalocottus; T. N. Gill, 1861

Type species
- Cottus platycephalus Pallas, 1814

Species
- See text.

= Megalocottus =

Genus of fishes

Megalocottus is a small genus of marine ray-finned fishes belonging to the family Cottidae, the typical sculpins. These fishes are found in the western Pacific Ocean.

== Taxonomy ==
Megalocottus was first proposed as a monospecific genus in 1861 by the American biologist Theodore Gill with Cottus paltycephalus which had been described in 1814 by Peter Simon Pallas from Kamchatka and the Sea of Okhotsk as its only species. The 5th edition of Fishes of the World classifies this genus in the subfamily Cottinae of the family Cottidae but other authorities classify it in the subfamily Myoxocephalinae of the family Psychrolutidae, although others place the subfamily Myoxocephalinae within the Cottidae.

== Etymology ==
Megalocottus prefixes megalo meaning "great" or large" with Cottus, presumed to be a reference to the large size of the type species.

== Species ==
Megalocottus currently contains two recognized:

- Megalocottus platycephalus (Pallas, 1814) (Belligerent sculpin)
- Megalocottus taeniopterus Kner, 1868 (Southern flathead sculpin)

Fishbase retains these two species as valid, other authorities treat the Southern flathead sculpin as a subspecies of the belligerent sculpin while others treat it as a M. taeniopterus as a junior synonym of M. platycephalus. This taxon is a sister taxon to the genus Myoxocephalus.

In 2020 workers undertook a comparison of the Mitochondrial DNA of the fourhorn sculpin (Myoxocephalus quadricornis) and the belligerent sculpin and found that the fourhorn sculpin was more closely related to the belligerent sculpin than it was to the other species in the genus Myoxocephalus, they proposed that the fourhorn sculpin be reclassified as a member of the genus Megalocottus.
