= Zadock Thompson =

American historian (1796–1856)

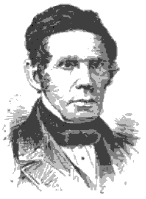

Personal details
- Born: May 23, 1796 Bridgewater, Vermont
- Died: January 19, 1856 (aged 59) Burlington, Vermont
- Spouse: Phebe Boyce
- Children: 3
- Occupation: Naturalist, professor, clergyman

Zadock Thompson (1796–1856), was a Vermont naturalist, professor, and Episcopal priest.

== Biography ==
Zadock Thompson was born in Bridgewater, Vermont on May 23, 1796. He graduated from the University of Vermont in 1823.

Thompson published numerous books on Vermont's history, the most notable being the History of the State of Vermont (1833) and History of the State of Vermont, Natural, Civil and Statistical (1842).

Thompson married Phebe Boyce and had three children: George Boyce Thompson, Harriet Towner Thompson, and Adeline Perry Thompson. Only his daughter, Adeline, survived childhood; she had four children before her death, at 30.

Zadock Thompson died in Burlington, Vermont on January 19, 1856.

== Taxon named after him ==
- The Deepwater Sculpin, Myoxocephalus thompsonii is a species of freshwater fish in the family Cottidae of order Scorpaeniformes.
