= Northstar Island =

Artificial island in the Beaufort Sea

Coordinates: 70°29′N 148°41′W

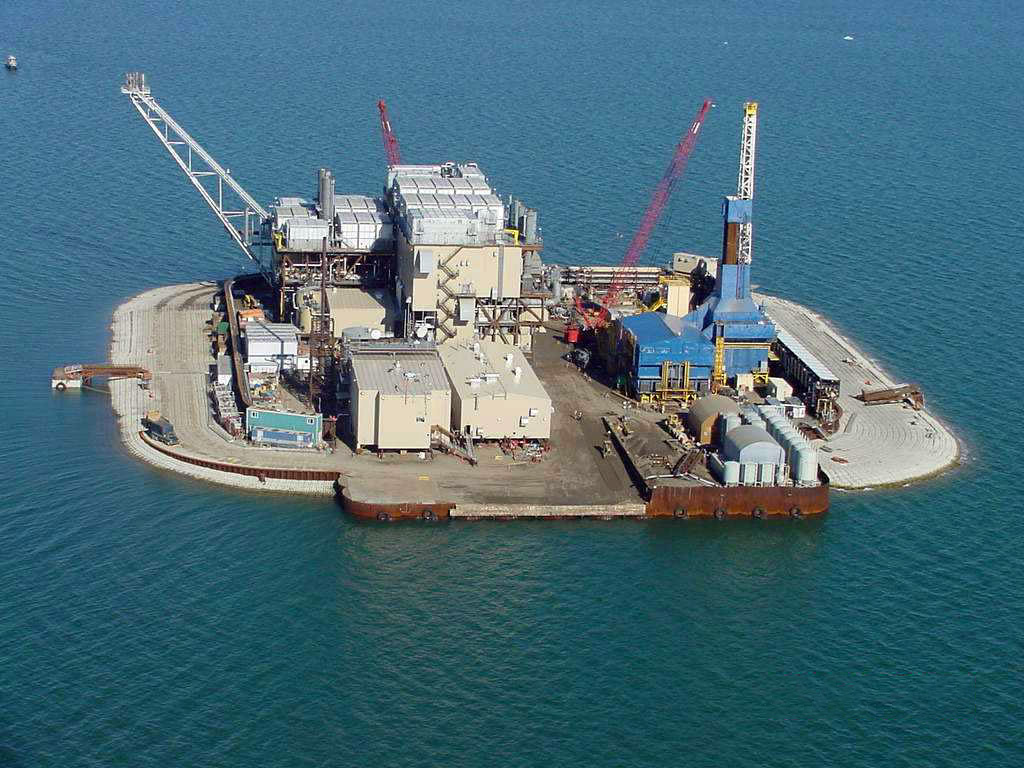
Northstar Island is almost entirely occupied by drilling equipment and structures.

Northstar Island is a 5-acre (20,000 m^{2}) artificial island in the Beaufort Sea, 12 miles (19 km) northwest of Prudhoe Bay, Alaska and 6 miles (9.7 km) north of the Alaska coast. The island was created to develop the Northstar Oil Pool, which is located approximately 12,500 feet (3,800 m) below the seabed. The oil pool was discovered on January 30, 1984 by Royal Dutch Shell.

A small artificial island was built at the site to house an exploration oil well. After additional exploration, Alaska International Construction began construction of the island in the winter of 1999–2000. A standard oil-drilling platform, such as those used in the Gulf of Mexico, was not feasible because of the annual formation of pack ice close to the northern Alaska coast. A stable, year-round artificial island was the only way to provide the permanent structures needed for a production oil well. To protect against the erosive force of masses of ice, the island's shores were covered in concrete mats that extend 4 feet (1.2 m) above the average waterline and 18 feet (5.5 m) below it.

Because of its distance from shore, no causeway could be built to the island, unlike with previous projects such as the creation of Endicott Island. Northstar Island thus became the first drilling operation in the Beaufort Sea to use a subsea pipeline to transport oil to shore and then into the Trans-Alaska Pipeline System. Through 2000 and 2001, construction continued. In the winter, an ice road was built across the frozen Beaufort Sea. In the summer, barges brought supplies.

During the first winter of construction, more than 700,000 cubic yards (540,000 m^{3}) of gravel was brought in from the Alaska mainland over ice roads to bring the island above sea level. To reach the seabed, workers had to cut blocks of frozen Beaufort Sea ice and remove them with cranes. Similar techniques had to be used as workers trenched the seafloor for the three pipelines connecting the island to the shore. The pipes were welded and placed in the trenches more than 7 feet (2.1 m) below the seabed. The trenches were then filled by the special floating backhoes that dug them. Because the Northstar Oil Pool is under high pressure, two pipelines were required: one to take oil away from Northstar, and the other to take natural gas to it to provide pressurization as oil is extracted. By the time the winter ice melted, the island was above sea level, and both pipelines were in place and tested.

In the summer of 2000, an equipment barge arrived at the island with the first modular buildings for the site, but not until a short delay was caused by Greenpeace activists who occupied the barge for 39 hours in Barrow. In October 2000, the first natural gas began to flow to the island to power equipment brought on the barge. The winter of 2000–2001 brought a new ice road and new construction, including the beginning of drilling on the island. The final two barges of modular equipment arrived in summer 2001.

When construction was completed, the entire Northstar Island project—including pipelines—cost $686 million. It immediately began to pay off, however. Production began on October 31, 2001, and it exceeded 50,000 bbl (7,900 m^{3}) per day by June 2002 and 70,000 bbl (11,000 m^{3}) per day by June 2003. By mid-2006, Northstar had pumped more than 100 million barrels (16,000,000 m^{3}) of oil. By mid-2007, that figure was more than 120 million. Today, the project is 98.08 percent owned by Hilcorp Alaska, LLC. The remaining 1.92 percent is controlled by Murphy Oil Co.

Production at Northstar has not always been smooth. In 2003, a transformer failed and shut down operations for more than a month until a heavy-duty helicopter flew in a new one. Specialized leak-detection equipment and sensors had to be developed to prevent problems with the unique undersea pipeline employed by the project in the Beaufort Sea.
