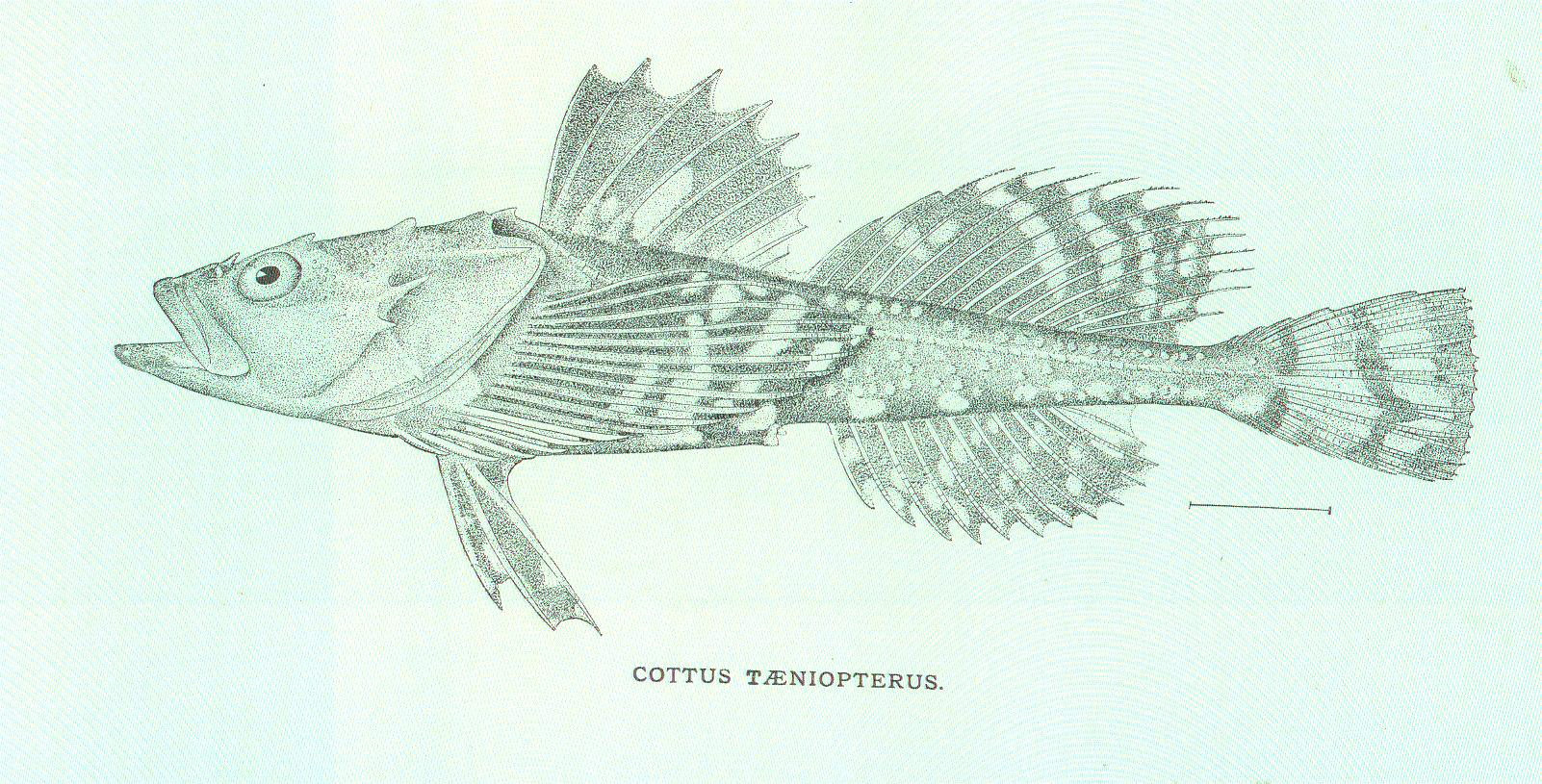

Conservation status
- Least Concern (IUCN 3.1)

Scientific classification
- Kingdom: Animalia
- Phylum: Chordata
- Class: Actinopterygii
- Order: Perciformes
- Suborder: Cottoidei
- Family: Psychrolutidae
- Genus: Megalocottus
- Species: M. taeniopterus

Binomial name
- Megalocottus taeniopterus (Kner, 1868)

Synonyms
- Cottus taeniopterus Kner, 1868; Megalocottus platycephalus taeniopterus (Kner, 1868); Myoxocephalus platycephalus taeniopterus (Kner, 1868)

= Southern flathead sculpin =

Species of fish

The southern flathead sculpin (Megalocottus taeniopterus) is a species of marine ray-finned fish belonging to the family Cottidae, the typical sculpins. This species occurs in the northern Pacific Ocean.

== Taxonomy ==
The southern flathead sculpin was first formally described as Cottus taeniopterus by the Austrian ichthyologist Rudolf Kner with its type locality given as Decastris Bay near the mouth of the Amur River in Russia. Some authorities consider that this species as a subspecies or junior synonym of M. platycephalus. FishBase still recognises two species within the genus Megalocottus.

== Distribution ==
The southern flathead sculpin is found in the northwestern Pacific Ocean in Amur Liman, Peter the Great Gulf and around southern Sakhalin.
