= Endicott Island =

Artificial island in North Slope Borough, Alaska, United States

Coordinates: 70°21′N 147°57.5′W

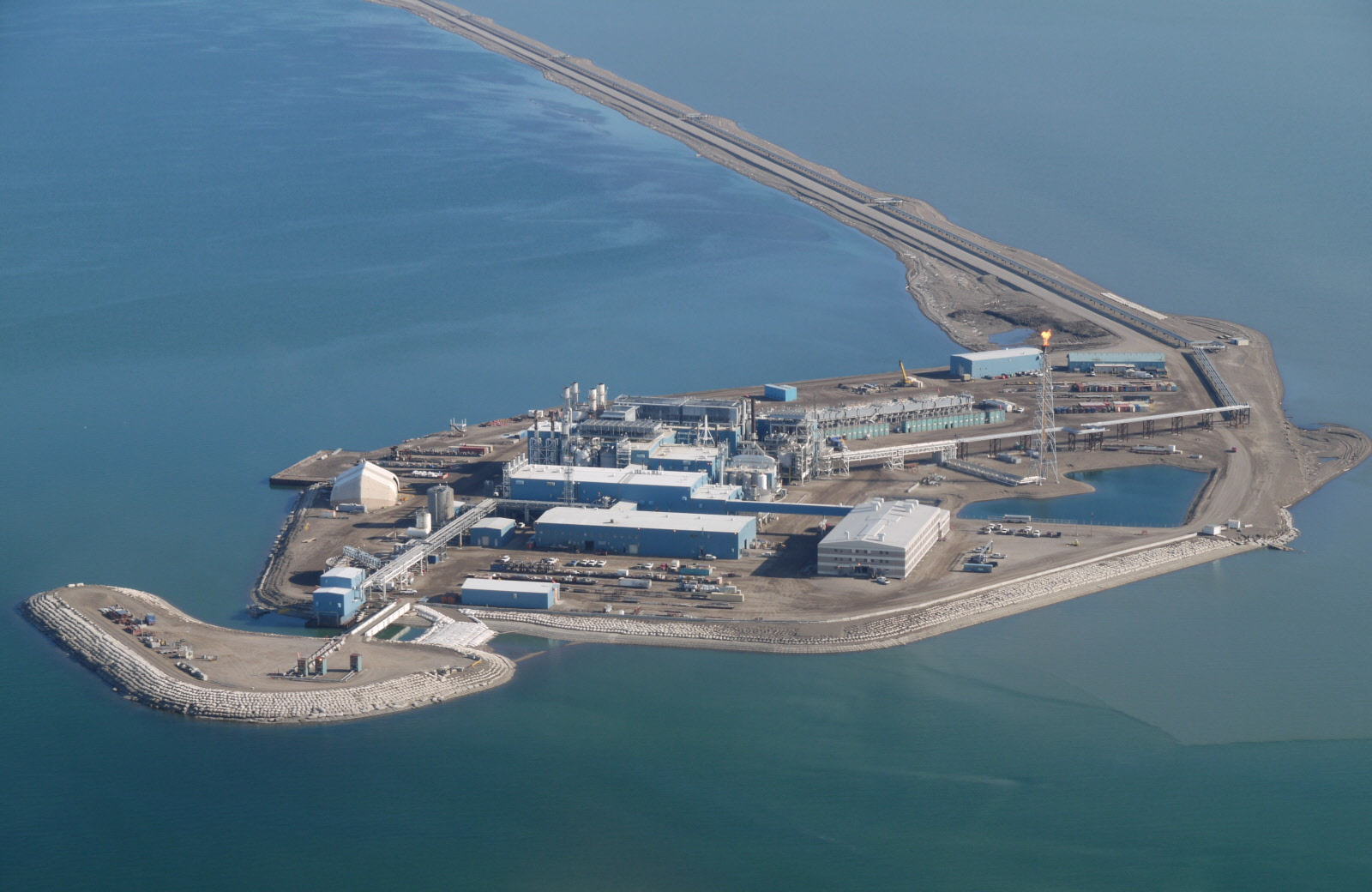
Endicott Island, August 2010

Endicott Island is a 45-acre (18 ha) artificial island located in the U.S. state of Alaska, 2.5 miles (4 km) offshore and 15 miles (24 km) from Prudhoe Bay of the Beaufort Sea. Endicott Island was built in 1987 by Alaska Interstate Construction and is used by BP and Hilcorp Alaska for petroleum production.

Endicott Island has a permanent causeway connecting it to the mainland, unlike Northstar Island which is too far out for any kind of causeway to be built.

Endicott Island was the first continuously producing offshore oil field in the Arctic, producing around 20,000 barrels (3,200 m^{3}) of oil per day. Approximately 423 million barrels (67,300,000 m^{3}) had been produced as of March 2003. Processed oil is sent from Endicott Island through a 24-mile (39 km) pipeline to the Trans-Alaska Pipeline, and thence to Valdez, Alaska.

In 1998 and 1999, illegal waste dumping at Endicott Island resulted in combined fines of US$1,500,000 against BP and Doyon Drilling, with further settlements of $24,000,000. In September 1999, one of BP’s US subsidiaries, BP Exploration Alaska (BPXA), agreed to resolve charges related to the illegal dumping of hazardous wastes on the Alaska North Slope, for $22 million. The settlement included the maximum $500,000 criminal fine, $6.5 million in civil penalties, and BP’s establishment of a $15 million environmental management system at all of BP facilities in the US and Gulf of Mexico that are engaged in oil exploration, drilling or production.

The charges stemmed from the 1993 to 1995 dumping of hazardous wastes on Endicott Island by BP’s contractor Doyon Drilling. The firm illegally discharged waste oil, paint thinner and other toxic and hazardous substances by injecting them down the outer rim, or annuli, of the oil wells. BPXA failed to report the illegal injections when it learned of the conduct, in violation of the Comprehensive Environmental Response, Compensation and Liability Act.
