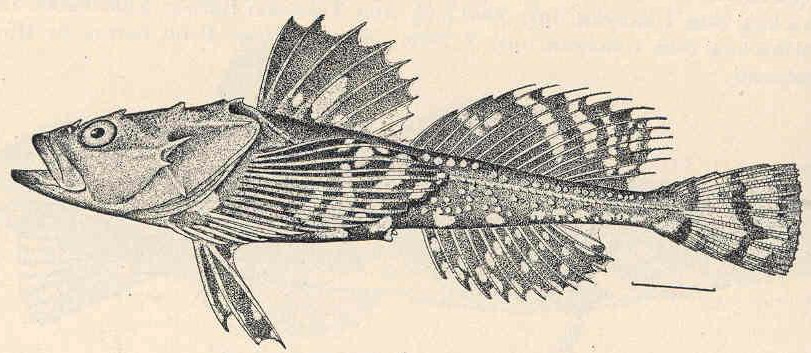

Scientific classification
- Kingdom: Animalia
- Phylum: Chordata
- Class: Actinopterygii
- Order: Perciformes
- Suborder: Cottoidei
- Family: Psychrolutidae
- Genus: Megalocottus
- Species: M. platycephalus

Binomial name
- Megalocottus platycephalus (Pallas, 1814)

Synonyms
- Cottus platycephalus Pallas, 1814; Megalocottus platycephalus platycephalus (Pallas, 1814); Myoxocephalus platycephalus (Pallas, 1814); Acanthocottus laticeps Gilbert, 1896; Megalocottus laticeps (Gilbert, 1896)

= Belligerent sculpin =

Species of fish

The belligerent sculpin (Megalocottus platycephalus), or flathead sculpin, is a species of marine ray-finned fish belonging to the family Cottidae, the typical sculpins. This species occurs in the northern Pacific Ocean.

== Taxonomy ==
The belligerent sculpin was first formally described in 1814 as Cottus platycephalus by the German zoologist Peter Simon Pallas with its type locality given as Kamchatka and the Sea of Okhotsk. In 1861 the American biologist Theodore Gill classified this species in the monospecific genus Megalocottus. Some authorities consider the belligerent sculpin to be the still the only species in its genus, either recognising the Southern flathead sculpin (M. taeniopterus) as a subspecies or junior synonym of M. platycephalus. Fishbase still recognises two species within the genus Megalocottus. The specific name playcephalus means "flat head", a reference to the wide, flat head with a projecting lower jaw.

== Description ==
The belligerent sculpin has a broad, strongly flattened head, much wider than it is deep with a projecting lower jaw. The top and the sides of the head are very warty and there are large spines or bumps behind the eye and on the nape, these may have short cirri on them. The first and second spines on the preoperculum are curved, the third and fourth are poorly developed. There are irregular rows of spiny plates over and under the lateral line. The colour is grey-brown marked with yellow or white spotting and blotching. The fins have spots and bars. This species reaches a maximum published total length of 42 cm (17 in).

== Distribution and habitat ==
The belligerent sculpin is found in the northern Pacific Ocean. Its range extends from the Sea of Japan, through the Sea of Okhotsk and the northern Kuril Islands and the southeastern Kamchatka Peninsula east to the Alaska Peninsula and north along the Bering Sea coasts of Alaska and Russia to the Chukchi Sea. It is a demersal fish, typically found in the subtidal zone down to depths of 40 m (130 ft), although 120 m (390 ft) has been claimed. It is found on substrates of sand, mud and gravel, especially where there are beds of Fucus and Zostera. It is generally found in brackish water close to river mouths, near to the shore and in shallow water.

== Biology ==
The belligerent sculpin's biology is not well known. They are oviparous. In the Spring they move closer inshore and into estuaries, even into the lower reaches of rivers. The juveniles feed on algae, and crustaceans such as copepods, cumaceans, amphipods, and mysids while the adults have a similar diet but they also eat small fishes.
