= Diporeia =

Scientific classification
- Kingdom: Animalia
- Phylum: Arthropoda
- Clade: Pancrustacea
- Class: Malacostraca
- Order: Amphipoda
- Family: Pontoporeiidae
- Genus: Diporeia; Bousfield, 1989

Type species
- Diporeia hoyi (S.I. Smith, 1874)

Species
- Diporeia brevicornis (Segerstråle, 1937); Diporeia erythophthalma (Waldron, 1953); Diporeia filicornis (S.I. Smith, 1874); Diporeia hoyi (S.I. Smith, 1874); Diporeia intermedia (Segerstråle, 1977); Diporeia kendalli (Norton, 1909)

Genus of amphipod

Diporeia is a North American genus of freshwater amphipod that was formerly a dominant form of zooplankton in the Great Lakes. Their loss in numbers is believed to be due to the presence of invasive species.

== Habitat ==
Diporeia are most common is areas of the Great Lakes with a water depth between 30 m (98 ft) and 125 m (410 ft) deep. They remain present throughout the Great Lakes, especially in Lake Superior.

== Decline ==
The population of Diporeia began to fall rapidly in the 1990s, a decline which has continued. The genus has seen major losses in all Great Lakes, with the exception of Lake Superior. The decline of the genus, believed to be due to invasive species of mussels, has negatively impacted the fishing industry in the Great Lakes.
