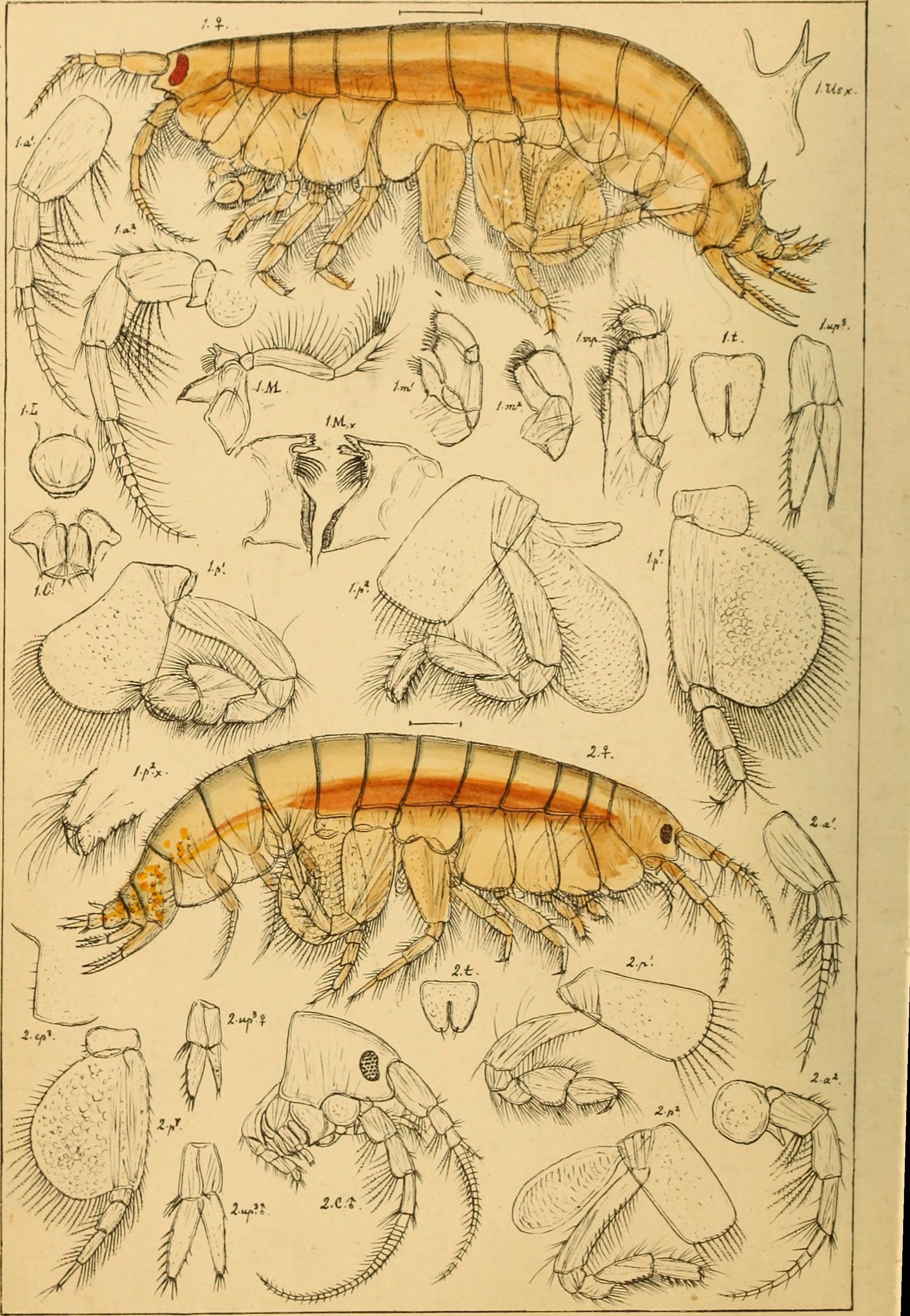
- Pontoporeia femorata (above) and Monoporeia affinis (below)

Scientific classification
- Kingdom: Animalia
- Phylum: Arthropoda
- Clade: Pancrustacea
- Class: Malacostraca
- Order: Amphipoda
- Parvorder: Haustoriidira
- Superfamily: Haustorioidea
- Family: Pontoporeiidae; Dana, 1853

Genera
- See text.

= Pontoporeiidae =

Family of crustaceans

Pontoporeiidae is a family of amphipods, containing the following genera:

- Diporeia Bousfield, 1989
- Monoporeia Bousfield, 1989
- Pontoporeia Krøyer, 1842
