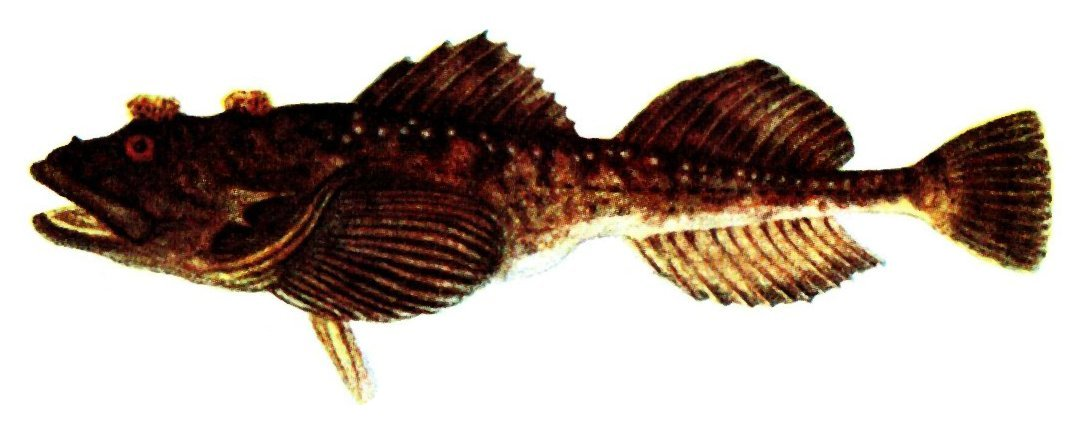

Conservation status
- Least Concern (IUCN 3.1)

Scientific classification
- Kingdom: Animalia
- Phylum: Chordata
- Class: Actinopterygii
- Division: Teleostei
- Order: Perciformes
- Suborder: Cottoidei
- Family: Psychrolutidae
- Genus: Myoxocephalus
- Species: M. quadricornis

Binomial name
- Myoxocephalus quadricornis (Linnaeus, 1758)

Synonyms
- Cottus quadricornis Linnaeus, 1758; Myoxocephalus quadricornis quadricornis (Linnaeus, 1758); Oncocottus quadricornis (Linnaeus, 1758); Triglops quadricornis (Linnaeus, 1758); Triglopsis quadricornis (Linnaeus, 1758); Triglopsis quadricornis quadricorniis (Linnaeus, 1758); Cottus hexacornis Richardson, 1823; Myoxocephalus quadricornis hexacornis (Richardson, 1823); Oncocottus hexacornis (Richardson, 1823); Cottus quadricornis relicta Lilljeborg, 1891; Myoxocephalus quadricornis relicta (Lilljeborg, 1891); Cottus latifrons Gratzianov, 1904; Myoxocephalus quadricornis lonnbergi Berg, 1916; Cottus quadricornis lonnbergi Lönnberg, 1919; Myoxocephalus quadricornis onegensis Berg & Popov, 1932; Cottus quadricornis vaenernensis Lönnberg, 1932; Cottus quadricornis frykenensis Lönnberg, 1932; Cottus quadricornis oernensis Lönnberg, 1932; Cottus quadricornis asundensis Lönnberg, 1932; Cottus quadricornis kallavesensis Lönnberg, 1933; Cottus quadricornis pygmaeus Lönnberg, 1933; Cottus quadricornis borkensis Lönnberg, 1939; Cottus quadricornis vermelnensis Nybelin

= Fourhorn sculpin =

Species of fish

The fourhorn sculpin (Myoxocephalus quadricornis) is a species of ray-finned fish belonging to the family Cottidae, the typical sculpins. This species has a Holarctic distribution and can be found in marine, brackish and fresh waters.

== Taxonomy ==
The fourhorn sculpin was first formally described as Cottus quadricornus in the 10th edition of Linnaeus's Systema Naturae with its type locality given as the Baltic Sea. In 2020 workers undertook a comparison of the Mitochondrial DNA of the fourhorn sculpin and the belligerent sculpin (Megalcottus platycephalus) and found that the fourhorn sculpin was more closely related to the belligerent sculpin than it was to the other species in the genus Myoxocephalus, they proposed that the fourhorn sculpin be reclassified as a member of the genus Megalocottus.

The deepwater sculpin Myoxocephalus thompsonii of continental North American freshwater lakes (e.g., the Great Lakes) is closely related to the fourhorn sculpin and alternatively considered as a subspecies of the latter, Myoxocephalus quadricornis thompsonii.

== Description ==
The fourhorn sculpin has a large knobbly head with protruding lips and four bony protuberances, though the latter are not present in freshwater, lake forms of this fish. The pectoral fins are large and rounded. Freshwater forms resemble the Alpine bullhead and European bullhead but can be distinguished from them by the fact that the dorsal and anal fins terminate further forward giving a greater length to the caudal peduncle. The head, body and fins are brownish, mottled and barred with darker colour. The belly of the male is yellowish-brown while that of the female is whitish. In the sea this fish reaches 20 to 30 cm (8 to 12 in) but in lakes it seldom exceeds 15 cm (6 in).

== Distribution and habitat ==
The fourhorn sculpin is a demersal fish distributed mainly in brackish arctic coastal waters in Canada, Greenland, Russia, and Alaska, and also as a relict in the boreal Baltic Sea. There are also freshwater populations in the lakes of Norway, Sweden, Finland and Karelia and in Arctic Canada (Nunavut and Northwest Territories).

== Biology ==
The fourhorn sculpin feeds on bottom-dwelling invertebrates and fish eggs. It breeds in winter between November and March and the male tends the eggs. He digs a hollow in the substrate into which the female lays a batch of eggs. He then remains on guard, fanning the eggs with his fins throughout the hundred-day incubation period.
