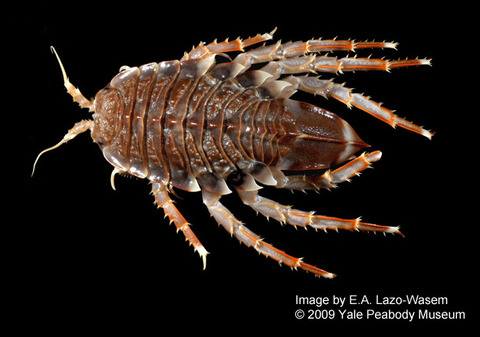

Scientific classification
- Kingdom: Animalia
- Phylum: Arthropoda
- Class: Malacostraca
- Order: Isopoda
- Family: Chaetiliidae
- Genus: Glyptonotus
- Species: G. antarcticus

Binomial name
- Glyptonotus antarcticus Eights, 1852

= Glyptonotus antarcticus =

Species of crustacean

Glyptonotus antarcticus is a benthic marine isopod crustacean in the suborder Valvifera. This relatively large isopod is found in the Southern Ocean around Antarctica. It was first described by James Eights in 1852 and the type locality is the South Shetland Islands.

== Description ==
Glyptonotus antarcticus has a typical maximum length of 9 cm (3.5 in), though may reach 20 cm (8 in) in rare cases; this is large for an isopod, most of which are between 0.5 and 1.5 cm (0.2–0.6 in) in length. Glyptonotus antarcticus has only five ommatidia, which is unusual for crustaceans and insects. These are clustered into two pairs of compound eyes, a large pair on the dorsal surface and a smaller pair on the ventral surface. It is thought that the latter are useful when the animal is swimming, which it does in an upside-down position. The whole surface of the animal is covered in minute cuticular outgrowths of feathery "hairs" and knobbly "scales", with the exception of the eyes, certain mouthparts, and feet. It is thought that these may help to prevent attachment of Foraminifera, larval organisms, and other encrusting epibionts on their body surface.

A 2005 genetic study suggested that Glyptonotus antarcticus may in fact represent several distinct species, otherwise known as a species complex.

== Distribution and habitat ==
Glyptonotus antarcticus is native to the Southern Ocean around Antarctica, where it occurs in large numbers. It lives on the seabed at depths ranging from the intertidal zone down to more than 600 m (2,000 ft).

== Biology ==
Glyptonotus antarcticus is a carnivore and scavenger and is often caught in baited traps on the seabed. It is an opportunistic predator with a mixed diet which includes a high proportion of echinoderms, but it is also cannibalistic. Food supply is likely to be fairly constant as the species breeds at any time of year. Females can breed when at least 7.5 cm (3 in) long. The eggs and young are brooded for an extended period —more than 1½ years— in the female's marsupium where they are nourished by a maternal secretion. As typical of Antarctic isopods, there is no pelagic larval stage.

== Research ==
Given its abundance and the fact that it is relatively easy to keep in aquaria, Glyptonotus antarcticus has become an important model organism used as a research object in ecological, biochemical and physiological studies.
