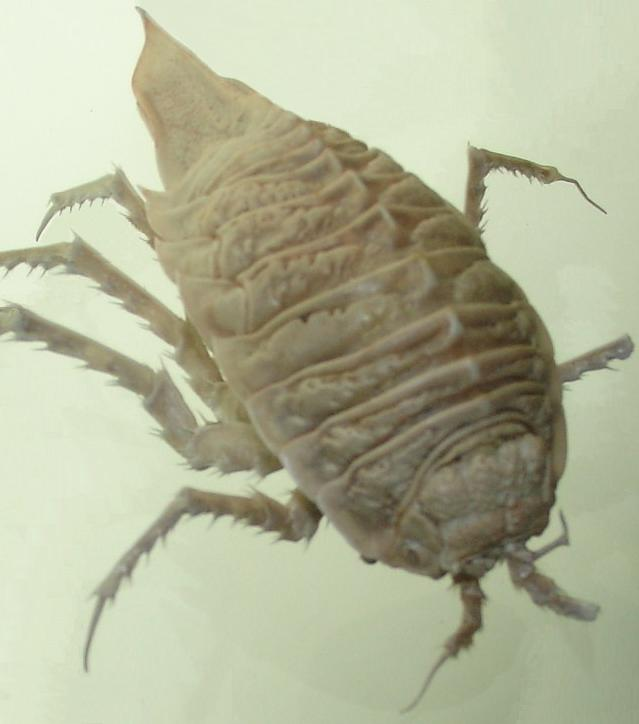
- Glyptonotus antarcticus, the type species

Scientific classification
- Kingdom: Animalia
- Phylum: Arthropoda
- Class: Malacostraca
- Order: Isopoda
- Family: Chaetiliidae
- Genus: Glyptonotus; Eights, 1852

= Glyptonotus =

Genus of crustaceans

Glyptonotus is a genus of marine isopod crustaceans found in the Antarctic Sea.

== Species ==
There are two recognized species:

- Glyptonotus acutus Richardson, 1906
- Glyptonotus antarcticus Eights, 1852
