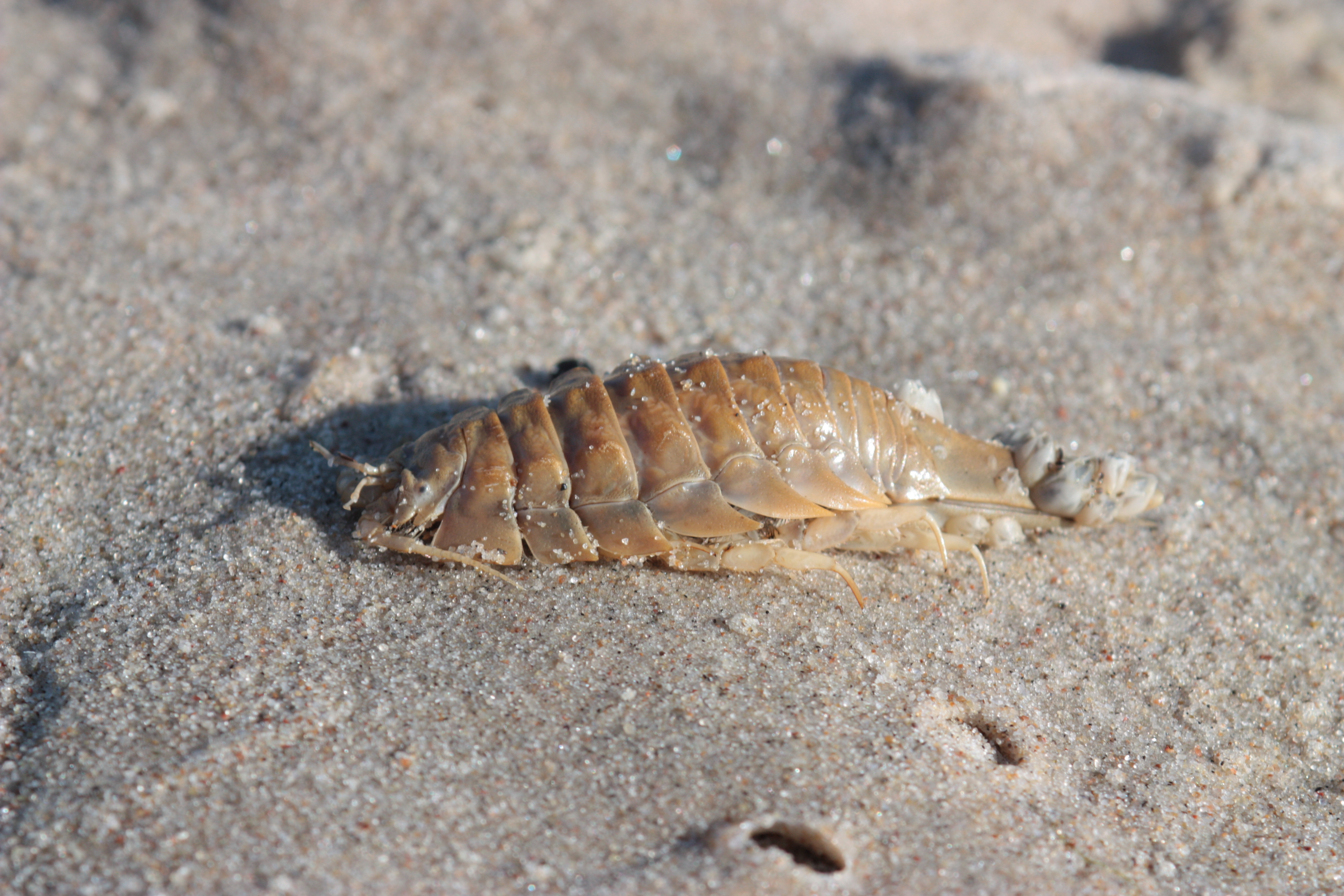
- Dead Saduria entomon washed up on the beach

Conservation status
- Least Concern (IUCN 3.1)

Scientific classification
- Kingdom: Animalia
- Phylum: Arthropoda
- Class: Malacostraca
- Order: Isopoda
- Family: Chaetiliidae
- Genus: Saduria
- Species: S. entomon

Binomial name
- Saduria entomon (Linnaeus, 1758)

Synonyms
- Oniscus entomon Linnaeus, 1758; Mesidotea entomon (Linnaeus, 1758)

= Saduria entomon =

Species of crustacean

Saduria entomon is a benthic isopod crustacean of the family Chaetiliidae. It is distributed along the coasts of the Arctic Ocean and of the northern Pacific Ocean. It is also found in the brackish Baltic Sea, where it is considered a glacial relict. Moreover, it is present in a number of North European lakes, including Ladoga, Vänern and Vättern. It has been introduced into the Black Sea.

== Biology ==
Saduria entomon is one of the largest crustaceans in the Baltic Sea. The largest ones are found in the depths of the Gulf of Bothnia, reaching a maximum length of nearly 9 cm (4 in). S. entomon are sexually dimorphic, with males growing larger and maturing at larger sizes than females. Most individuals die after reproduction, and the species might be functionally semelparous, but it is probably capable of iteroparity. Its lifespan is 3 years, possibly much longer.

Saduria entomon is a predator that feeds on other benthic animals, such as Monoporeia affinis. It is also a scavenger and a cannibal.
