= Saduria sibirica =

Scientific classification
- Kingdom: Animalia
- Phylum: Arthropoda
- Class: Malacostraca
- Order: Isopoda
- Family: Chaetiliidae
- Genus: Saduria
- Species: S. sibirica

Binomial name
- Saduria sibirica Birula, 1896

Species of crustacean

Saduria sibirica is a benthic isopod crustacean of the family Chaetiliidae. It is widespread in Arctic marine water near the coasts of Siberia.
