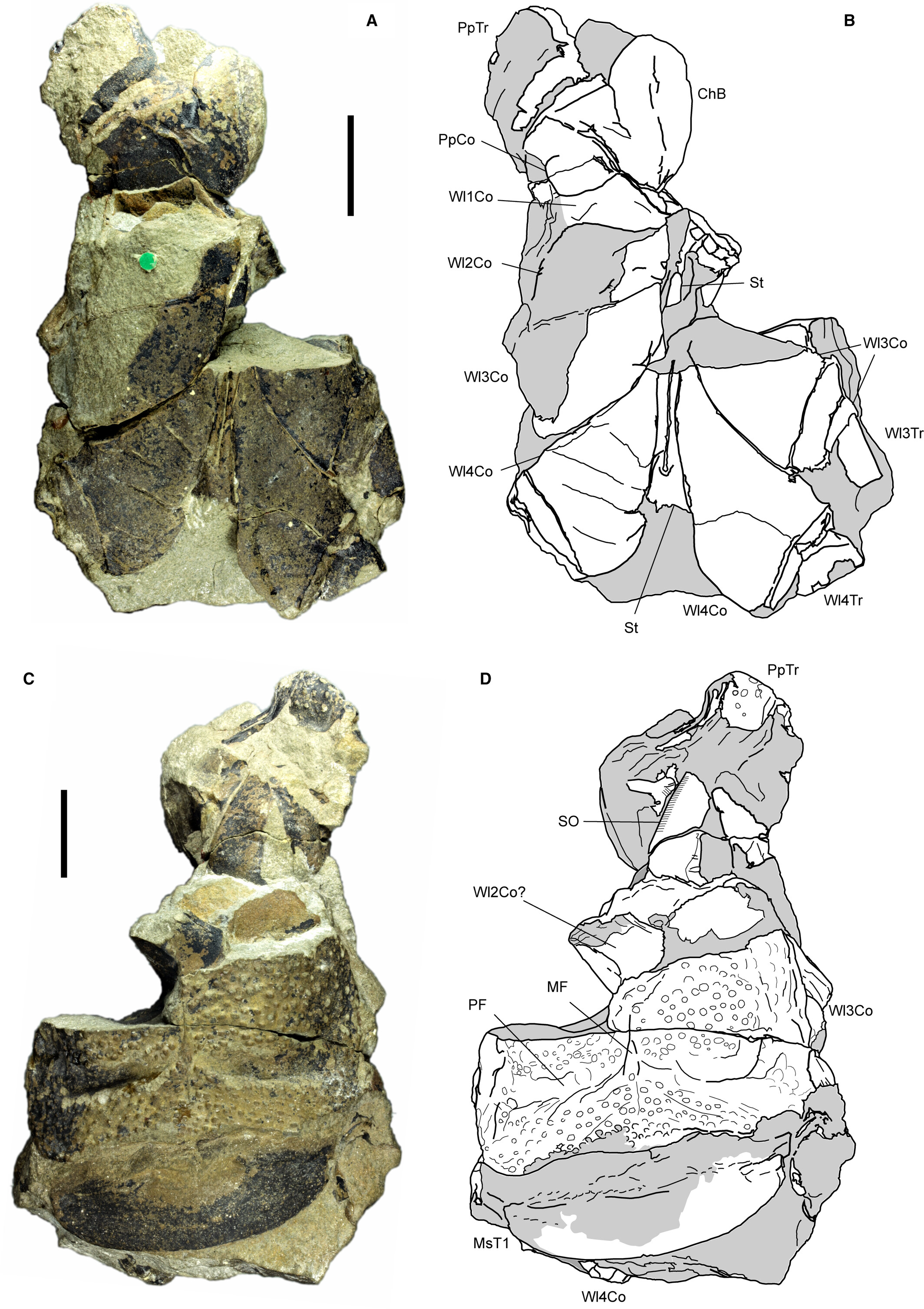
- Lectotype specimen of P. gigas
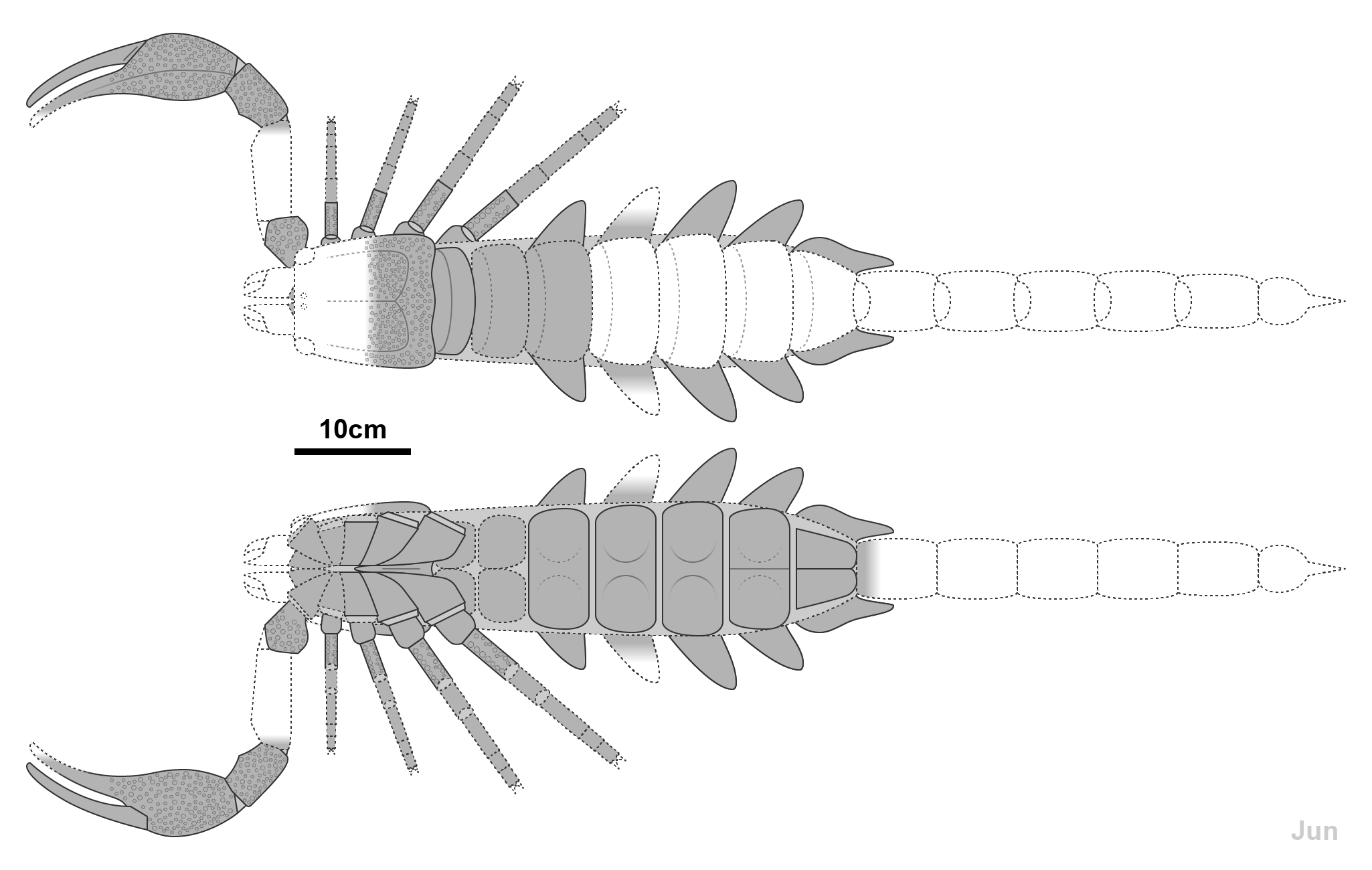
- Diagrammatic reconstruction of P. gigas

Scientific classification
- Kingdom: Animalia
- Phylum: Arthropoda
- Subphylum: Chelicerata
- Class: Arachnida
- Order: Scorpiones
- Family: †Praearcturidae; Kjellesvig-Waering, 1986
- Genus: †Praearcturus; Woodward, 1870
- Species: †P. gigas

Binomial name
- †Praearcturus gigas Woodward, 1870

Synonyms
- Bennettarthra annwnensis Fayers, Trewin & Morrissey, 2010; Brontoscorpio anglicus Kjellesvig-Waering, 1972; Prearcturus gigas (Woodward, 1870) lapsus calami

= Praearcturus =

Praearcturus Temporal range: Lochkovian (Possible Famennian record)

Extinct genus of scorpion

Praearcturus (lit. 'before Arcturus') is an extinct genus of large scorpion known from the Devonian period of what is now Britain. The genus contains a single species, Praearcturus gigas, the sole member of the family Praearcturidae. The definitive identity of Praearcturus was historically considered enigmatic, first described as a giant isopod and subsequently argued as a myriapod or eurypterid. None of the proposed identifications were agreed by various researchers, until the scorpion interpretation was suggested in 1980. While some researchers have expressed uncertainty regarding the authenticity of this interpretation, a first hand redescription of the lectotype and other assigned fossil remains using photographs and CT scans thoroughly supported that Praearcturus is most likely a scorpion. Proposed junior synonyms include Bennettarthra and Brontoscorpio, the latter of which has been also previously argued to be a member of the same family.

== Discovery and naming ==
The type specimen of P. gigas, which is a portion of body segments from a large fossil arthropod, was discovered from the Lower Devonian St. Maughan's Formation of the Old Red Sandstone in Rowlestone, England, and was described as a giant isopod in 1870 by the English paleontologist Henry Woodward. The generic name combines the Latin word "prae" meaning "before" and the isopod genus Arcturus, while the specific epithet is derived from the Ancient Greek word γίγας (gigas, "giant"). In 1885, the German paleontologist Karl Alfred von Zittel classified Praearcturus as a member of the myriapod family Arthropleuridae, closely related to the genus Arthropleura. In the appendix of his 1934 publication, the English geologist William Wickham King listed the taxon (misspelled as Prearcturus gigas) within Eurypterida without rationale. In 1969, the American paleonotologist Robert R. Hessler listed various arthropod genera including Praearcturus under Peracarida incertae sedis, stating that such taxa either certainly do not represent this superorder or are too fragmentary for a definitive classification; in the same publication, the English paleontologist William David Ian Rolfe disagreed with both the isopod and arthropleurid interpretation.

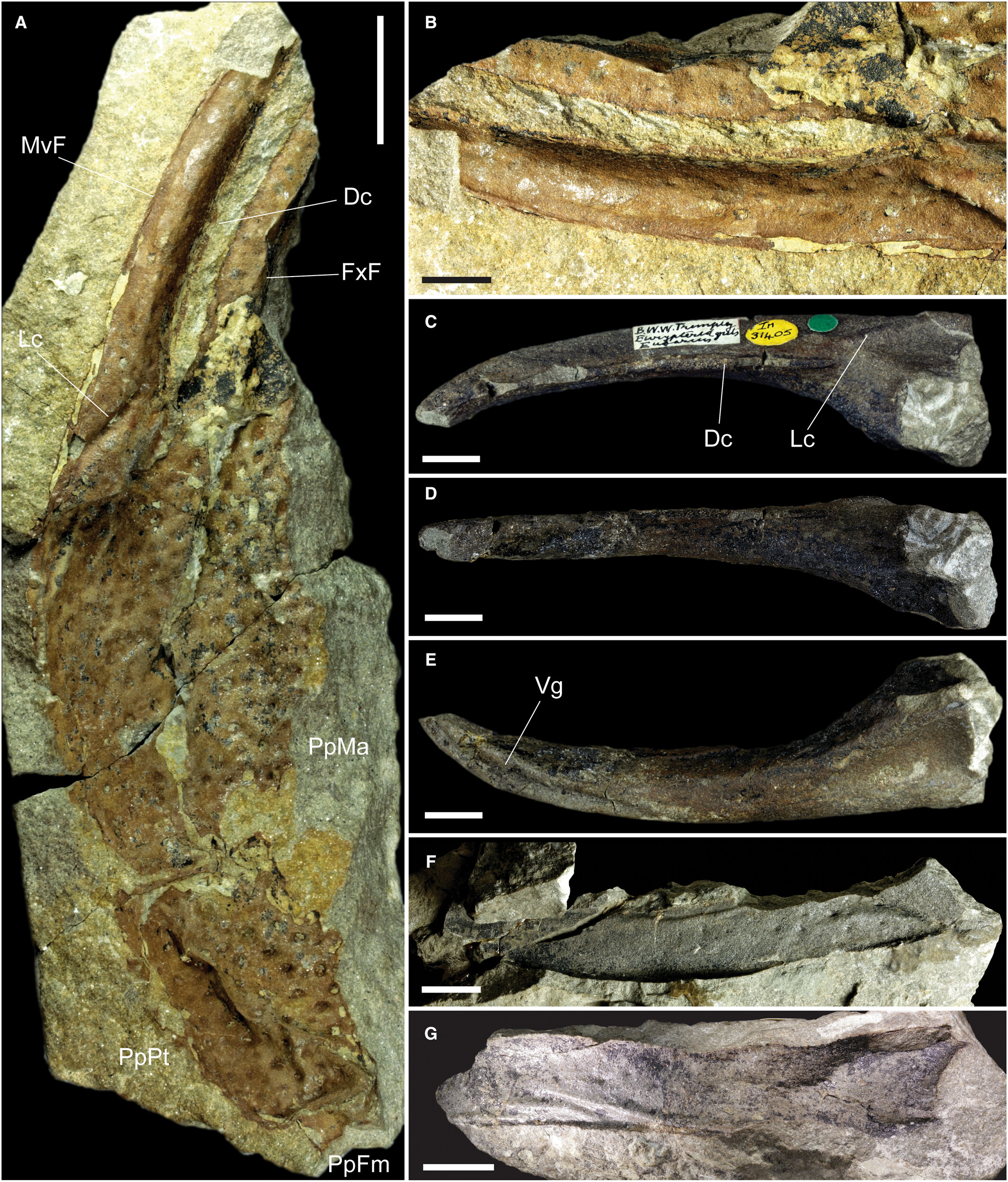
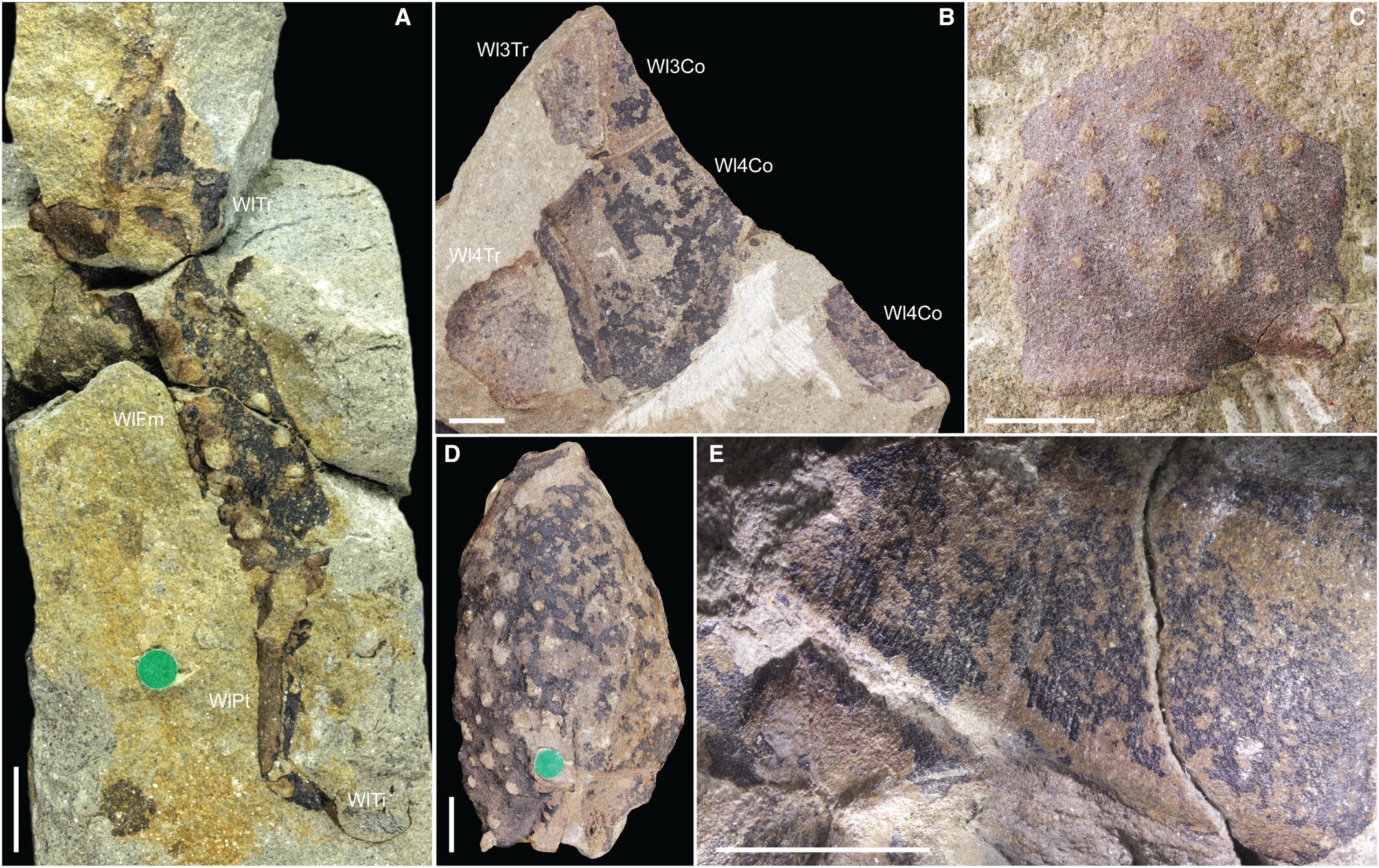
Appendicular remains of Praearcturus gigas, with C-G (top image) representing the syntypes of Brontoscorpio anglicus

In 1972, Erik N. Kjellesvig-Waering described a new genus and species of scorpion, Brontoscorpio anglicus, on the basis of an incomplete, nearly 10 cm (3.9 in) long single free finger of a right pedipalp (specimens NHMUK PI In 31 403-405), alongside the impressions made by the finger on its surrounding matrix from the St. Maughan's Formation, the age of which was then considered as late Silurian. Kjellesvig-Waering estimated its total length up to 77.2–86.2 cm (30.4–33.9 in) and 91.5–94 cm (36.0–37.0 in) based on modern scorpion genera Tityus and Vaejovis respectively, though noted that the former estimation based on Tityus should be taken with caution due to Brontoscorpio having a stouter free finger.

In 1980, Rolfe interpreted Praearcturus as a scorpion, and claimed that it was based on the personal communications by Leif Størmer (1974) and Erik N. Kjellesvig-Waering (1978) and the figures from his 1969 publication. In 1986, Kjellesvig-Waering agreed with the scorpion interpretation and assigned a single tergite (plate-like upper portion of the arthropod body segment) fossil from the Lower Devonian of Wyoming to this genus. He also named the new family Praearcturidae to contain Praearcturus and Brontoscorpio, specifically placed within the new superfamily Spongiophonoidea and new infraorder Holosternina. Fragmentary cuticles possibly belonging to this genus are also known from the Upper Devonian (Famennian) of Portishead. The scorpion interpretation has been held without question until 2024, when Jason A. Dunlop and Russell J. Garwood expressed uncertainty, for the fragmentary type material seemed to lack definitive features of scorpions and arachnids. In the same year, Simon J. Braddy also considered that the original interpretation as a crustacean is more likely, with the supposed pedipalp (2nd pair of chelicerate appendages near the mouth) of a scorpion more likely being a cheliped (modified pincer-like legs) of a crustacean. He further suggested that the type specimen of the other giant scorpion Brontoscorpio might represent a dactylus (terminal segment) of a crustacean, and that Bennettarthra is related to or synonymous with Praearcturus as both taxa show similar morphology.

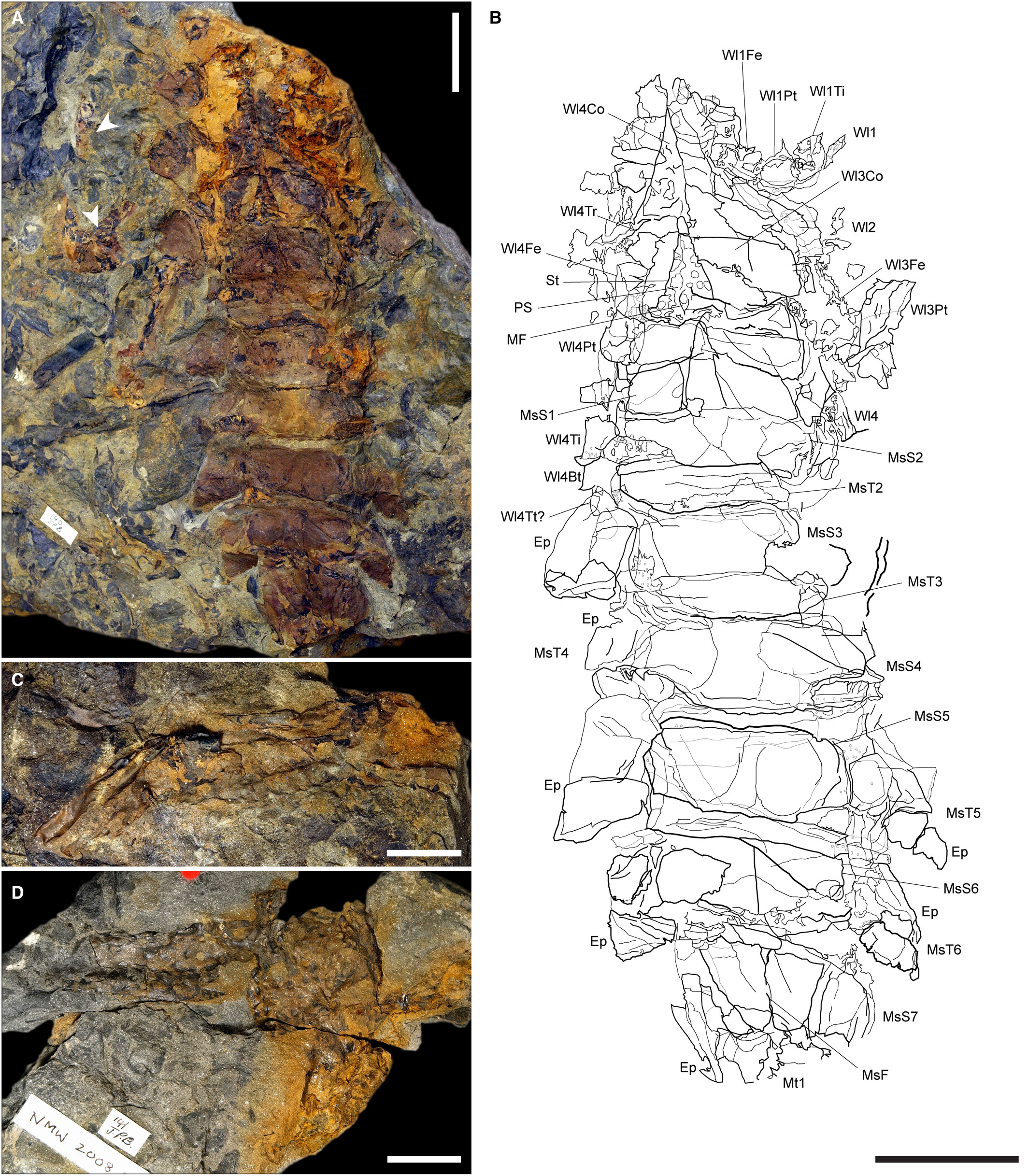
Holotype and associated material of Bennettarthra annwnensis

In 2026, Richard J. Howard and colleagues recorded photographs and CT scans of the lectotype and other assigned remains of Praearcturus, and argued that the taxon most likely represents a scorpion. Howard et al. (2026) suggested that the shape of its sternum (lower portion of the arthropod body segment) most closely resembles that of Eramoscorpius, and that its carapace (upper shell) and chelae are similar to those of other scorpions. They noted that its large size and opisthosoma with epimera (triangular lateral extensions of tergite) may possibly indicate an aquatic or semi-aquatic lifestyle which is consistent with the fact that the fossils are discovered in fluvial sediments. Additionally, they argued that Bennettarthra and Brontoscorpio represent junior synonyms of Praearcturus based on direct comparison, as the original materials of both species are considered indistinguishable from Praearcturus. They also commented that the taxon cannot be confidently classified as either Spongiophonoidea or Holosternina, as their examination of the specimens did not concur with the questionable diagnosis by Kjellesvig-Waering (1986), but the shape of the sternum suggests that it is more basal (early-diverging) than the modern crown-group scorpions (Orthosterni), similar to Eramoscorpius.

== Description ==
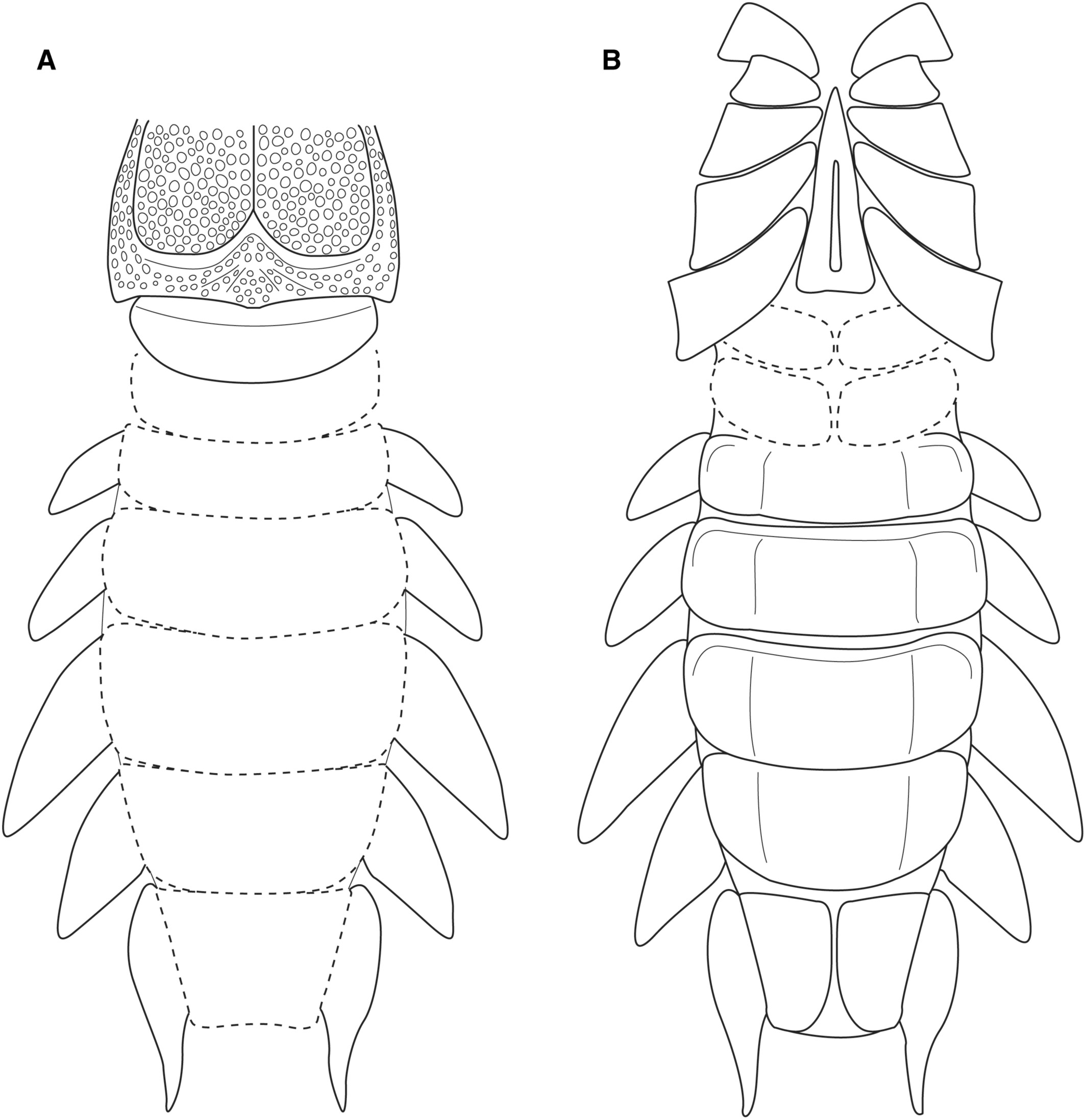
Restoration of the main body region, with epimera based on Bennettarthra

Based on the aforementioned redescription, Praearcturus is the largest scorpion ever known, with a pedipalp chela measured up to 16 cm (6.3 in), and an estimated total body length of possibly 1 m (3.3 ft). The genus is known only from fragmentary specimens, including the main body and remains of appendages.

The prosoma (head) was dorsally covered by a carapace with tubercles and a M-shaped groove, but the anterior half is unknown. underneath the prosoma are coxae (basal segments) of the pedipalps and four pairs of walking legs, as wells as a triangular sternum. Chelicerae (anterior feeding appendages) are mostly unknown, but a section previously though to be part of the leg coxae might represent its basal segment. The pedipalp coxae have evenly spaced ridges, which may represent stridulatory organs. The pedipalp terminated by an inward-curving chela with lateroventral movable finger, just like other scorpions. Remains of walking legs are scarce, but the trochanter (second segment) seems to be smoother than the remaining segments. The sternum is very similar to those of Eramoscorpius, featuring an anterior tip reaching beyond the second leg coxae and a distinctive median sulcus.

The opisthosoma (trunk) was mostly known by a specimen originally referred to as "Bennettarthra", although only the mesosoma (seven-segmented frontal half) was preserved. At least the last five segments have epimera, a feature which is so far unknown from other scorpions. Underneath the mesosoma are seven plates, with the first two bilobated and might represent its genital opercula and pectines (comb-like sensory appendages) respectively. The third through sixth plates are relatively large and simple, but the last plate was laterally divided into two pieces. The metasoma (five-segmented tail-like sections and stinger) is nearly unknown, but the remain of its first segment suggest it does not have epimera.

== Paleoecology ==
Praearcturus was speculated to be an aquatic or semi-aquatic predator, living along the braided river zone and mainly feeding on aquatic prey, as terrestrial animals were not abundant at that time and were possibly unable to support the dietary needs of an animal as large as Praearcturus. They coexisted with eurypterids such as Pagea, and pterygotids might have been among its prey as well as its competitors. Vertebrates like ostracoderms and gnathostomes may have also been possible prey of Praearcturus. Various trackway fossils are known from the Tredomen Quarry, where evidence of Bennettarthra, Pteraspis, and Zenaspis have also been found.
