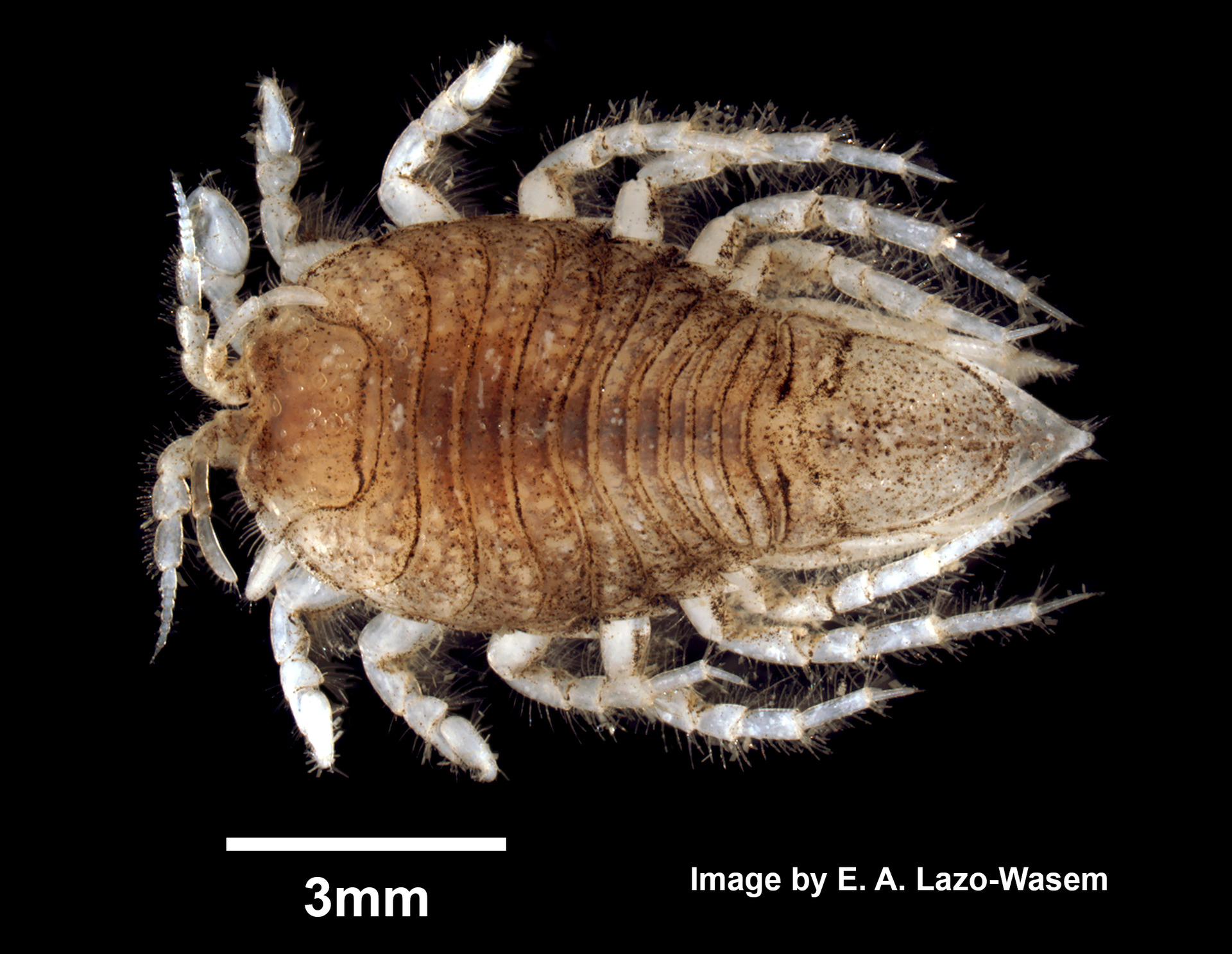
- Chiridotea coeca 1818

Scientific classification
- Kingdom: Animalia
- Phylum: Arthropoda
- Class: Malacostraca
- Order: Isopoda
- Family: Chaetiliidae
- Genus: Chiridotea
- Species: C. coeca

Binomial name
- Chiridotea coeca (Say, 1818)

Synonyms
- Idotea coeca Say, 1818; Chiridotea nigrescens Wigley, 1961

= Chiridotea coeca =

Species of crustacean

Chiridotea coeca, the sand isopod, is a species of isopod crustacean found in the western Atlantic Ocean, from Nova Scotia to Florida.

== Characteristics ==
Adult sand isopods are horizontally flattened. The thorax is almost round from above and the long, robust legs with large setae. The abdomen is short and pointed. Sand isopods reach 15 mm (0.59 in) in length and 7 mm (0.28 in) in width. They use the last pair of legs to dig tunnels in sand. When removed from the tunnels (for instance, by wave action), sand isopods swim down to the substrate, where they dig underground again.

== Ecology ==
Chiridotea coeca feeds on carrion, which it holds with its gnathopods while chewing pieces off with its mandibles.
