= Holognathidae =

Scientific classification
- Kingdom: Animalia
- Phylum: Arthropoda
- Class: Malacostraca
- Order: Isopoda
- Suborder: Valvifera
- Family: Holognathidae

Family of crustaceans

Holognathidae is a family of crustaceans belonging to the order Isopoda.

== Genera ==
The family contains the following genera:

- Chongxidotea
- Cleantioides Kensley & Kaufman, 1978
- Cleantis Dana, 1849
- Holognathus Thomson, 1904
- Zenobianopsis Hale, 1946
