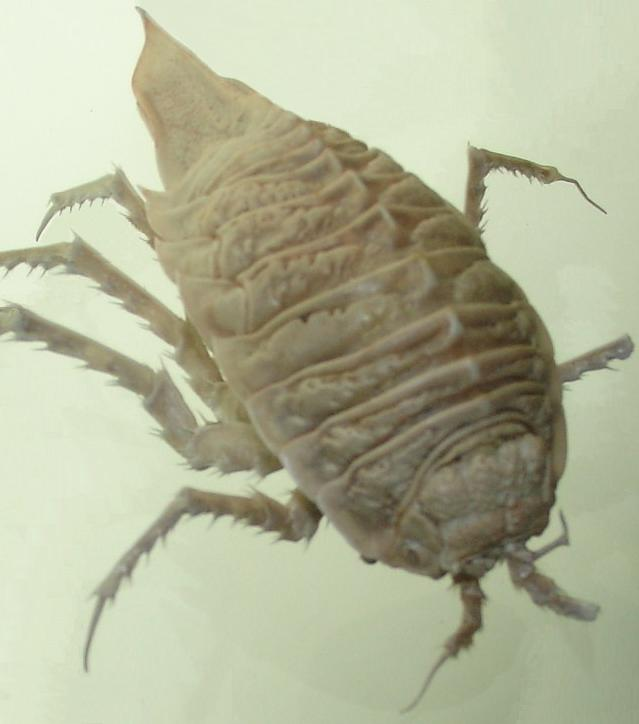
- Glyptonotus antarcticus (Chaetiliidae)

Scientific classification
- Kingdom: Animalia
- Phylum: Arthropoda
- Clade: Pancrustacea
- Class: Malacostraca
- Order: Isopoda
- Suborder: Valvifera; Sars, 1882

= Valvifera =

Suborder of crustaceans

The Valvifera are marine isopod crustaceans. Valviferans are distinguished by the flat, valve-like uropods which hinge laterally and fold inward beneath the rear part of their bodies, covering the pleopods. Some species are omnivorous, and serve as effective scavengers.

== Families ==
Twelve families are recognised:

- Antarcturidae Poore, 2001 (17 genera)
- Arcturidae Dana, 1849 (14 genera)
- Arcturididae Poore, 2001 (one genus)
- Austrarcturellidae Poore & Bardsley, 1992 (five genera)
- Chaetiliidae Dana, 1849 (13 genera)
- Holidoteidae Wägele, 1989 (four genera)
- Holognathidae Thomson, 1904 (five genera)
- Idoteidae Samouelle, 1819 (24 genera)
- Pseudidotheidae Ohlin, 1901 (one genus)
- Rectarcturidae Poore, 2001 (four genera)
- Thermoarcturidae Poore, 2015 (three genera)
- Xenarcturidae Sheppard, 1957 (one genus)
