= Rectarcturidae =

Scientific classification
- Kingdom: Animalia
- Phylum: Arthropoda
- Clade: Pancrustacea
- Class: Malacostraca
- Order: Isopoda
- Suborder: Valvifera
- Family: Rectarcturidae; Poore, 2001

Family of crustaceans

Rectarcturidae is a family of marine isopods belonging to the suborder Valvifera.

== Genera ==
There are four genera:

- Galathearcturus Poore, 2013
- Nowrarcturus Poore, 2013
- Rectarcturus Schultz, 1981
- Tasmarcturus Poore, 2013
