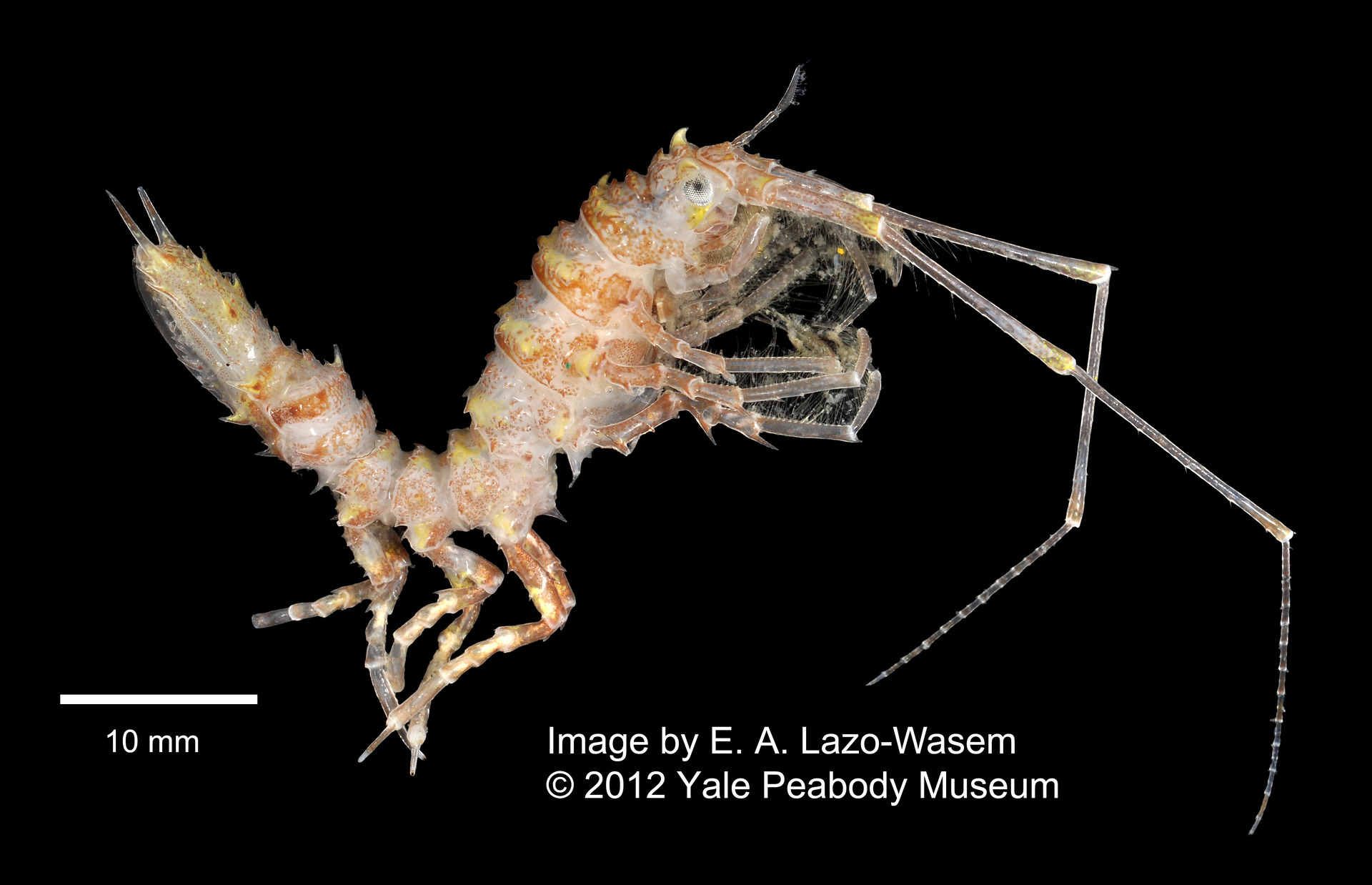
- Antarcturidae

Scientific classification
- Kingdom: Animalia
- Phylum: Arthropoda
- Clade: Pancrustacea
- Class: Malacostraca
- Order: Isopoda
- Suborder: Valvifera
- Family: Antarcturidae; Poore, 2001

= Antarcturidae =

Family of crustaceans

Antarcturidae is a family of marine isopods belonging to the suborder Valvifera.

== Genera ==
There are 17 genera:

- Abyssarcturus Kussakin & Vasina, 1995
  - Abyssarcturus averincevi Kussakin & Vasina, 1995
- Acantharcturus Schultz, 1981
  - Acantharcturus brevipleon Kussakin & Vasina, 1997
  - Acantharcturus acutipleon Schultz, 1981
  - Acantharcturus longipleon Kussakin & Vasina, 1997
- Antarcturus zur Strassen, 1902
  - Antarcturus hempeli Wägele, 1988
  - Antarcturus breidensis Nunomura, 2005
  - Antarcturus signiensis White, 1979
  - Antarcturus hodgsoni Richardson, 1913
  - Antarcturus kilepoae Kussakin, 1971
  - Antarcturus schmidti Brandt, 1990
  - Antarcturus polaris (Hodgson, 1902)
  - Antarcturus alimus Schultz, 1978
  - Antarcturus glacialis (Beddard, 1886)
  - Antarcturus andriashevi Kussakin & Vasina, 1995
  - Antarcturus nonatoi Pires & Sumida, 1997
  - Antarcturus kamtschaticus Kussakin, 1971
  - Antarcturus weddelli Brandt, 1990
  - Antarcturus hirsutus (Richardson, 1904)
  - Antarcturus strasseni Brandt, 1990
  - Antarcturus multispinis (Benedict, 1898)
  - Antarcturus horridus Tattersall, 1921
  - Antarcturus giganteus Brandt, 1990
  - Antarcturus johnstoni Hale, 1946
  - Antarcturus caecus (Kussakin & Vasina, 1995)
  - Antarcturus spinacoronatus Schultz, 1978
  - Antarcturus usitatus Schultz, 1978
  - Antarcturus kladophoros Stebbing. 1908
  - Antarcturus zenkevitchi Kussakin, 1971
  - Antarcturus furcatus (Studer, 1882)
  - Antarcturus tenuispinis (Benedict, 1898A)
  - Antarcturus annaoides Menzies 1956B
  - Antarcturus oryx zur Strassen, 1902
- Caecarcturus Schultz, 1981
  - Caecarcturus quadraspinosus Schultz, 1981
- Chaetarcturus Brandt, 1990
  - Chaetarcturus abyssicolus (Beddard, 1886)
  - Chaetarcturus bathybialis (Birstein, 1963)
  - Chaetarcturus crosnieri Poore, 1998
  - Chaetarcturus globicaudis (Kussakin, 1982)
  - Chaetarcturus oligospinis (Kussakin, 1971)
  - Chaetarcturus taniae Poore, 1998
  - Chaetarcturus bovinus (Brandt & Wägele, 1988)
  - Chaetarcturus abyssalis (Birstein, 1963)
  - Chaetarcturus aculeatus (Kussakin, 1967)
  - Chaetarcturus beddardi (Gurjanova, 1935)
  - Chaetarcturus cryophilus Hille, Held & Wägele, 2002
  - Chaetarcturus adareanus (Hodgson, 1902)
  - Chaetarcturus praecipius (Menzies & George, 1972)
  - Chaetarcturus tenuispinatus Kussakin & Vasina, 1998
  - Chaetarcturus franklini (Hodgson, 1902)
  - Chaetarcturus acutispinis (Kussakin, 1982)
  - Chaetarcturus brunneus (Beddard, 1886)
  - Chaetarcturus echinatus (Kussakin, 1982)
  - Chaetarcturus myops (Beddard, 1886)
  - Chaetarcturus spinifrons (Beddard, 1886)
  - Chaetarcturus ultraabyssalis (Birstein, 1963)
  - Chaetarcturus longispinosus Brandt, 1990
  - Chaetarcturus pacificus (Gurjanova, 1955)
  - Chaetarcturus cervicornis Noli, Brandt, Di Franco & Schiaparelli, 2022
- Cylindrarcturus Schultz, 1981
  - Cylindrarcturus elongatus Schultz, 1981
  - Cylindrarcturus leucophthalmus Kussakin & Vasina, 1995
  - Cylindrarcturus longitelson Brandt, 2002
- Fissarcturus Brandt, 1990
  - Fissarcturus bathyweddellensis Brandt, 2007
  - Fissarcturus mawsoni Hale, 1946
  - Fissarcturus paxillaris Kussakin & Vasina, 1998
  - Fissarcturus hirticornis Monod, 1926
  - Fissarcturus elongatus Brandt, 1990
  - Fissarcturus minutus Brandt, 1990
  - Fissarcturus robustus Brandt, 1990
  - Fissarcturus sandwichi Brandt, 2007
  - Fissarcturus stephenseni Wägele, 1991
  - Fissarcturus rossi Brandt, 2007
  - Fissarcturus granulosus Nordenstam, 1933
  - Fissarcturus sclerosus Brandt, 1990
  - Fissarcturus emarginatus Brandt, 1990
  - Fissarcturus patagonicus Ohlin, 1901
  - Fissarcturus poorei Kussakin & Vasina, 1998
  - Fissarcturus rugosus Nordenstam, 1933
  - Fissarcturus stebbingnordenstami Brandt, 1990
  - Fissarcturus walteri Brandt, 2013
  - Fissarcturus argentinensis Pereira, Roccatagliata & Doti, 2020
- Furcarcturus Baltzer, Held & Wägele, 2000
  - Furcarcturus polarsterni Baltzer, Held & Wägele, 2000
- Glaberarcturus Kussakin & Vasina, 1998
  - Glaberarcturus stellae Kussakin & Vasina, 1998
- Globarcturus Kussakin & Vasina, 1994
  - Globarcturus angelika Kussakin & Vasina, 1994
- Halearcturus Poore, 2015
  - Halearcturus serrulatus (Whitelegge, 1904)
- Litarcturus Brandt, 1990
  - Litarcturus americanus Beddard, 1886
  - Litarcturus lillei Tattersall, 1921
  - Litarcturus coppingeri Miers, 1881
  - Litarcturus bicornis Kensley, 1984
  - Litarcturus antarcticus Bouvier, 1910
  - Litarcturus stebbingi Beddard, 1886
  - Litarcturus kexueiae Liu & Sha, 2015
- Marmachius Poore, 2012
  - Marmachius princeps (Kussakin & Vasina, 1998)
  - Marmachius fortunae Poore, 2012
- Mixarcturus Brandt, 1990
  - Mixarcturus acanthurus Monod, 1925
  - Mixarcturus abnormis Kussakin, 1967
  - Mixarcturus digitatus Nordenstam, 1933
- Oxyarcturus Brandt, 1990
  - Oxyarcturus dubius (Kussakin, 1967)
  - Oxyarcturus beliaevei (Kussakin, 1967)
  - Oxyarcturus spinosus (Beddard, 1886)
  - Oxyarcturus holoacanthus Pereira, Roccatagliata & Doti, 2023
- Tuberarcturus Brandt, 1990
  - Tuberarcturus pallidoculus Kussakin & Vasina, 1998
  - Tuberarcturus fungifer Kussakin & Vasina, 1998
  - Tuberarcturus drygalskii Vanhöffen, 1914
  - Tuberarcturus belgicae Monod, 1925
  - Tuberarcturus cactiformis Kussakin, 1967
- Xiphoarcturus Pereira, Roccatagliata & Doti, 2019
  - Xiphoarcturus carinatus Pereira, Roccatagliata & Doti, 2019
  - Xiphoarcturus kussakini Pereira, Roccatagliata & Doti, 2019
