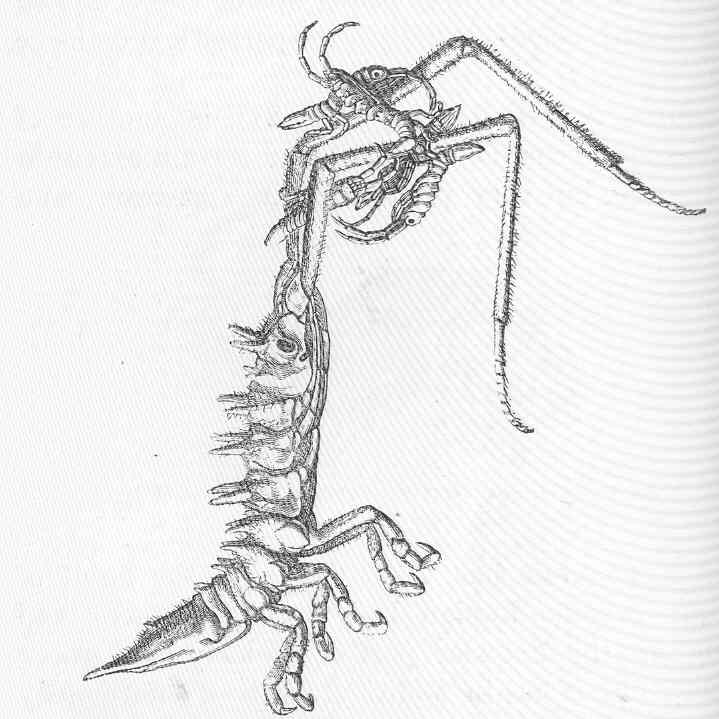

Scientific classification
- Kingdom: Animalia
- Phylum: Arthropoda
- Clade: Pancrustacea
- Class: Malacostraca
- Order: Isopoda
- Suborder: Valvifera
- Family: Arcturidae; Dana, 1849

Synonyms
- Amesopodidae; Astacillidae

= Arcturidae =

Family of crustaceans

The Arcturidae are a family of marine isopod crustaceans in the suborder Valvifera. Members of the family resemble woodlice and are found globally in cooler areas in shallow seas.

== Description ==
The head is incapable of rotating laterally. Two pairs of antennae are set at the front of the head. The eyes are usually well developed and the mouthparts do not form a suctorial cone or proboscis. The thorax or pereon is smooth or slightly sculptured and sometimes spinose or rugose. A flexion occurs between it and the abdomen or pleon, so from a lateral view, the front part of the animal is arched up. The pereiopods are held close to the head, while the pleopods are attached to the pleon, making it appear no appendages on the pereon.

== Genera ==
The World Register of Marine Species includes these genera in the family:

- Agularcturus Kensley, 1984
- Amesopous Stebbing, 1905
- Arctopsis Barnard, 1920
- Arcturina Koehler, 1911
- Arcturinella Poisson & Maury, 1931
- Arcturinoides Kensley, 1977
- Arcturopsis Koehler, 1911
- Arcturus Latreille, 1829
- Astacilla Cordiner, 1793
- Edwinjoycea Menzies & Kruczynski, 1983
- Idarcturus Barnard, 1914
- Neastacilla Tattersall, 1921
- Parastacilla Hale, 1924
- Spectarcturus Schultz, 1981
