= Chiridotea =

Scientific classification
- Kingdom: Animalia
- Phylum: Arthropoda
- Class: Malacostraca
- Order: Isopoda
- Family: Chaetiliidae
- Genus: Chiridotea; Harger, 1878

Species
- See text

Genus of crustaceans

Chiridotea is a genus of isopod crustaceans in the family Chaetiliidae, containing the following species:

- Chiridotea almyra Bowman, 1955
- Chiridotea arenicola Wigley, 1960
- Chiridotea coeca (Say, 1818)
- Chiridotea excavata Harper, 1974
- Chiridotea tuftsii (Stimpson, 1853)
