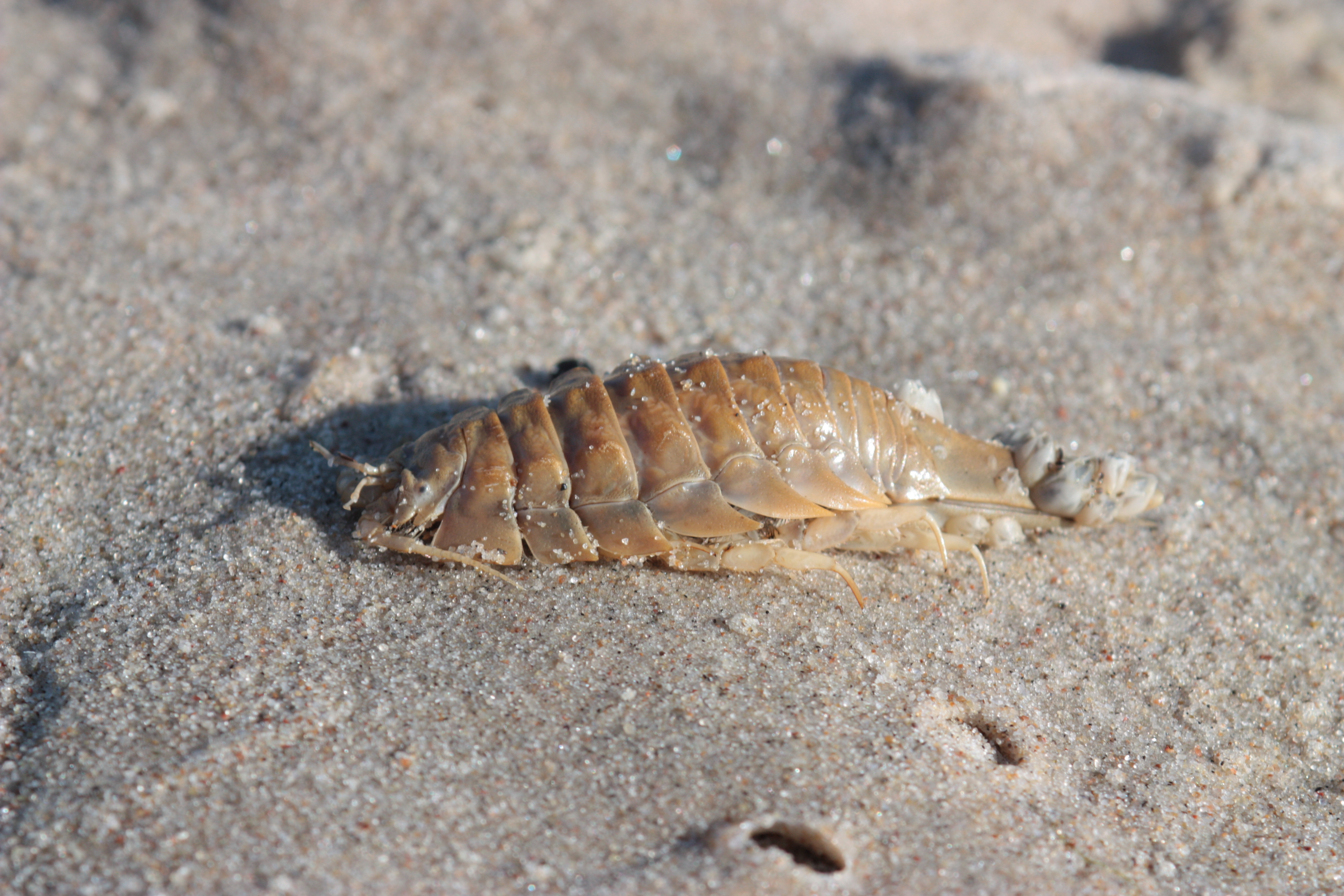
- Dead Saduria entomon washed up on a beach

Scientific classification
- Kingdom: Animalia
- Phylum: Arthropoda
- Class: Malacostraca
- Order: Isopoda
- Family: Chaetiliidae
- Genus: Saduria; Adams, 1852

= Saduria =

Genus of crustaceans

Saduria is a genus of benthic isopod crustaceans in the family Chaetiliidae, containing the following species:

- Saduria entomon (Linnaeus, 1758)
- Saduria megalura (G. O. Sars, 1879)
- Saduria sabini (Krøyer, 1849)
- Saduria sibirica (Birula, 1896)
