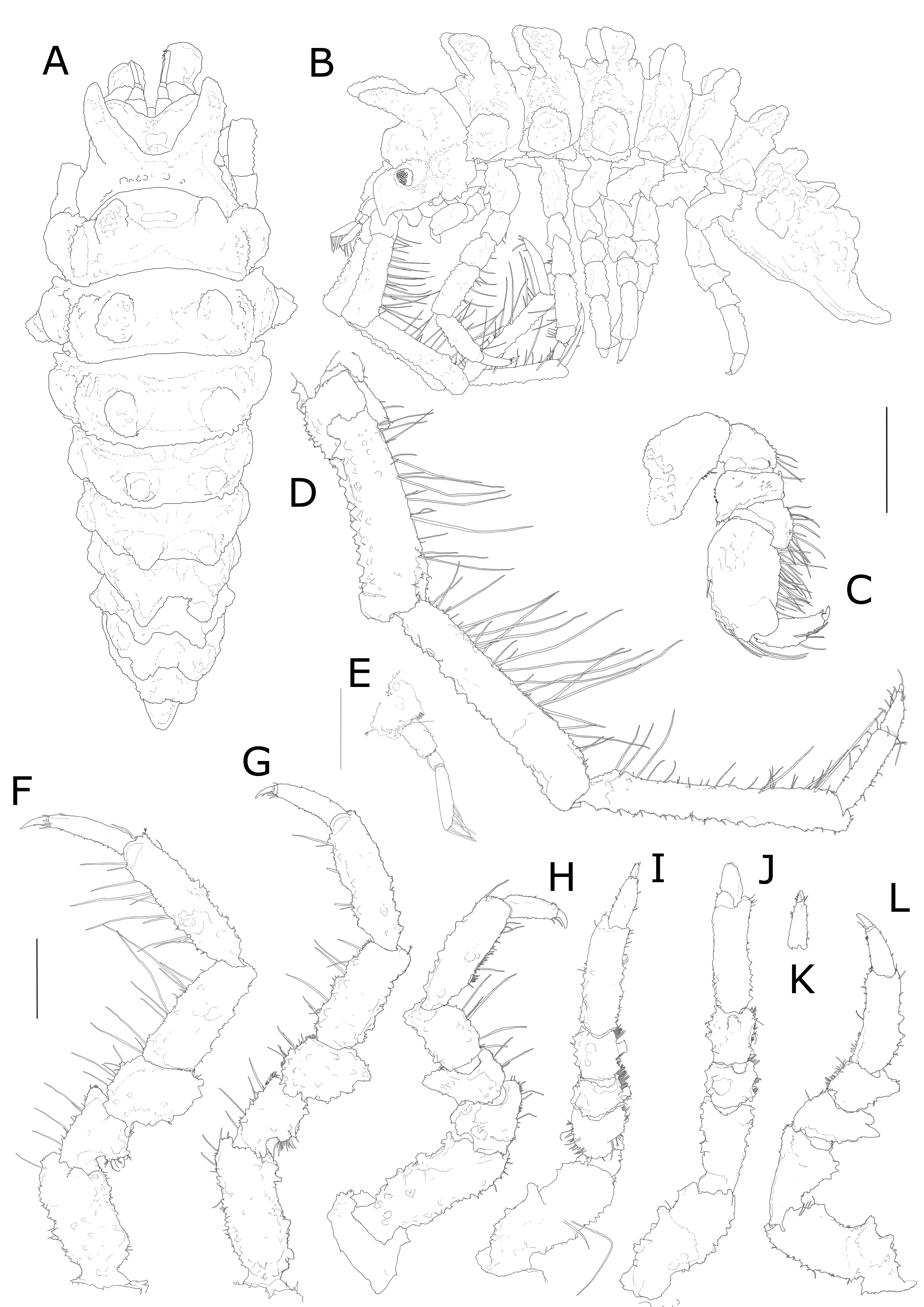
- Pseudidothea armata

Scientific classification
- Kingdom: Animalia
- Phylum: Arthropoda
- Clade: Pancrustacea
- Class: Malacostraca
- Order: Isopoda
- Suborder: Valvifera
- Family: Pseudidotheidae
- Genus: Pseudidothea; Ohlin, 1901

= Pseudidothea =

Genus of crustaceans

Pseudidothea is a genus of crustaceans belonging to the monotypic family Pseudidotheidae.

The species of this genus are found in southernmost South Hemisphere.

Species:

- Pseudidothea hoplites Poore & Bardsley, 2004
- Pseudidothea miersi (Studer, 1884)
- Pseudidothea richardsoni Hurley, 1957
- Pseudidothea scutata (Stephensen, 1947)
