= Austrarcturellidae =

Scientific classification
- Kingdom: Animalia
- Phylum: Arthropoda
- Class: Malacostraca
- Order: Isopoda
- Suborder: Valvifera
- Family: Austrarcturellidae

Family of crustaceans

Austrarcturellidae is a family of crustaceans belonging to the order Isopoda.

== Genera ==
Austrarcturellidae contains the following genera:

- Abyssarcturella Poore & Bardsley, 1992
- Austrarcturella Poore & Bardsley, 1992
- Dolichiscus Richardson, 1913
- Pseudarcturella Tattersall, 1921
- Scyllarcturella Poore & Bardsley, 1992
