= Xenarcturus =

Scientific classification
- Kingdom: Animalia
- Phylum: Arthropoda
- Class: Malacostraca
- Order: Isopoda
- Suborder: Valvifera
- Family: Xenarcturidae
- Genus: Xenarcturus; Sheppard, 1957
- Species: X. spinulosus

Binomial name
- Xenarcturus spinulosus Sheppard, 1957

Genus of crustaceans

Xenarcturus is a monotypic genus of crustaceans belonging to the monotypic family Xenarcturidae. The only species is Xenarcturus spinulosus.

The species is found in Southern America.
