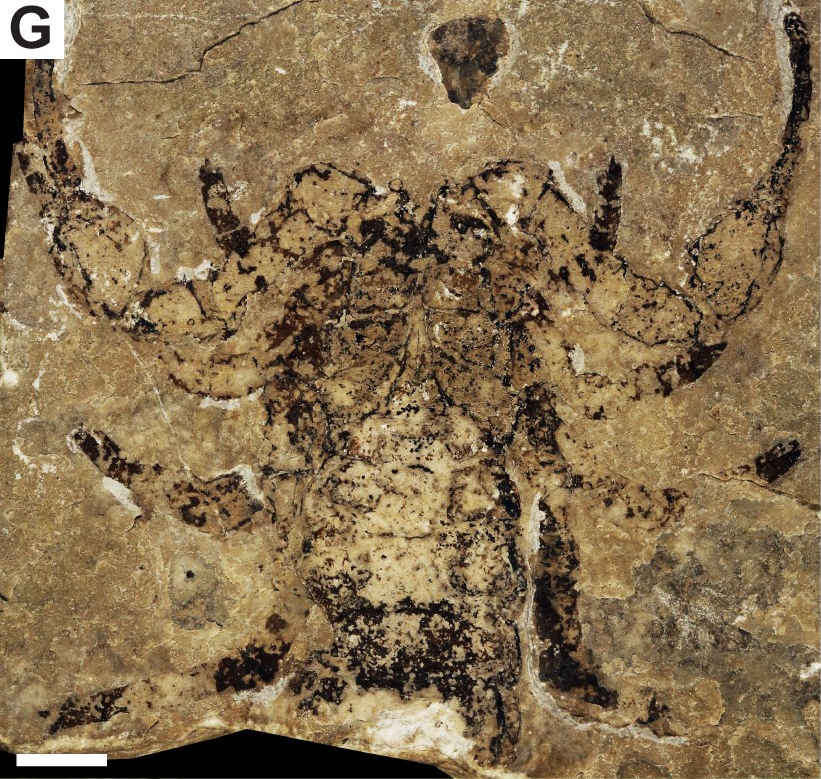
- A fossil of Eramoscorpius (ROM 5324)
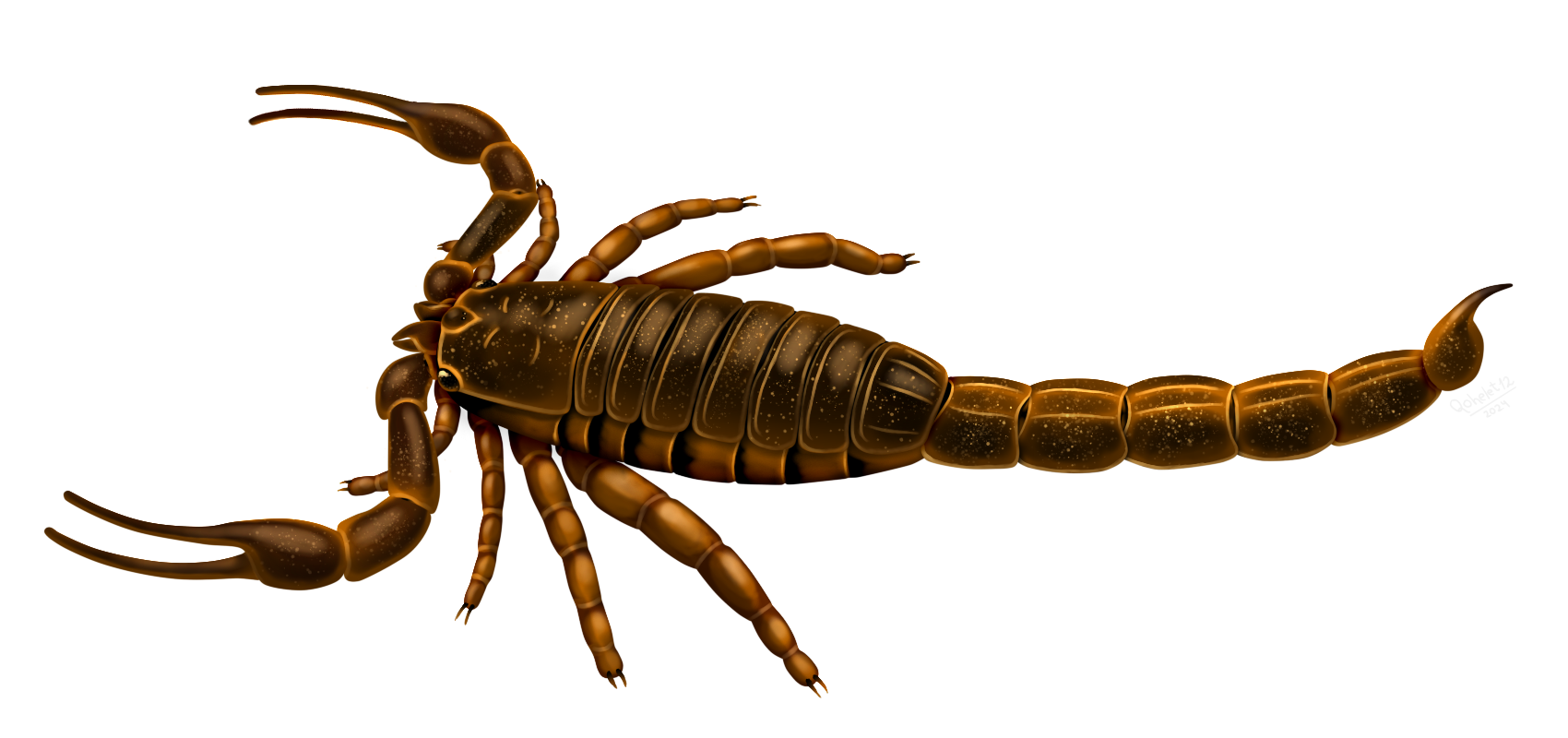
- Reconstruction of Eramoscorpius

Scientific classification
- Kingdom: Animalia
- Phylum: Arthropoda
- Subphylum: Chelicerata
- Class: Arachnida
- Order: Scorpiones
- Genus: †Eramoscorpius; Waddington, Rudkin & Dunlop, 2015
- Species: †E. brucensis

Binomial name
- †Eramoscorpius brucensis Waddington, Rudkin & Dunlop, 2015

= Eramoscorpius =

Eramoscorpius Temporal range: Wenlock

Extinct genus of scorpion

Eramoscorpius is an extinct genus of Silurian scorpions from the Eramosa Member in Ontario. It was likely one of the first semi-terrestrial scorpions. The genus contains a single species, Eramoscorpius brucensis.

== Description ==
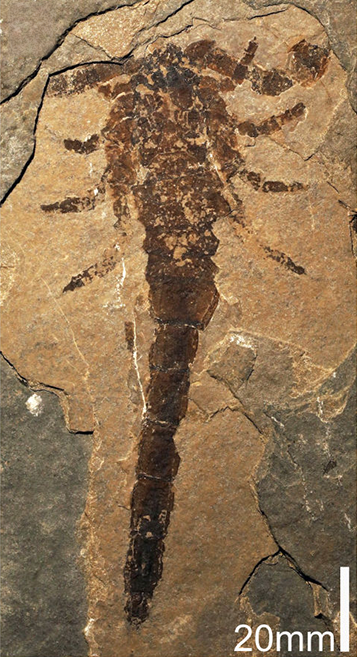
Specimen ROM 58778

Eramoscorpius was roughly 17 cm long at largest, with individuals in various size classes. Unusually for most Silurian scorpions, its tarsi resembled those of modern scorpions, suggesting the ability to walk on land. Most other Silurian scorpions, on the other hand, had tarsi much longer than basitarsi, or pointed crab-like legs, meaning they would have likely walked on their "toes" and therefore would have been rather slow on land. However, the morphology of the coxosternae still suggests Eramoscorpius was mainly aquatic. While its sternal morphology resembles the "giant" scorpion Praearcturus, appendages are unknown from that genus, alongside the two differing in the absence of coxapophyses. Eramoscorpius likely moulted on land or in very shallow water, thereby avoiding larger predators such as eurypterids, alongside explaining why seemingly all fossils are likely exuviae. 2019 study confirmed that Eramoscorpius had book lungs.

== Etymology ==
Eramoscorpius derives from the Eramosa Member where it was found, alongside "-scorpius", a common suffix for scorpions. The specific name brucensis derives from its fossils being found on the Bruce Peninsula.
