= Holidoteidae =

Scientific classification
- Domain: Eukaryota
- Kingdom: Animalia
- Phylum: Arthropoda
- Class: Malacostraca
- Order: Isopoda
- Suborder: Valvifera
- Family: Holidoteidae; Wägele, 1989

Family of crustaceans

Holidoteidae is a family of marine isopods belonging to the suborder Valvifera.

== Genera ==
There are four genera:

- Austroarcturus Kensley, 1975
- Holidotea Barnard, 1920
- Neoarcturus Barnard, 1914
- Pleuroprion zur Strassen, 1903
