= Arcturides =

Scientific classification
- Kingdom: Animalia
- Phylum: Arthropoda
- Class: Malacostraca
- Order: Isopoda
- Suborder: Valvifera
- Family: Arcturididae
- Genus: Arcturides; Studer, 1882

Genus of crustaceans

Arcturides is a genus of crustaceans belonging to the monotypic family Arcturididae.

Species:

- Arcturides acuminatus Sheppard, 1957
- Arcturides cornutus (Studer, 1882)
- Arcturides miersi (Studer, 1884)
- Arcturides richardsoni (Hurley, 1957)
- Arcturides scutatas (Stephensen, 1947)
