= Thermoarcturidae =

Scientific classification
- Kingdom: Animalia
- Phylum: Arthropoda
- Clade: Pancrustacea
- Class: Malacostraca
- Order: Isopoda
- Suborder: Valvifera
- Family: Thermoarcturidae; Poore, 2015

Family of crustacean

Thermoarcturidae is a family of marine isopods in the suborder Valvifera. It was originally described by Poore in 2015.

== Genera ==
The family contains the following three genera:

- Califarcturus Poore, 2015
- Spinarcturus Kensley, 1978
- Thermoarcturus Paul & Menzies, 1971
