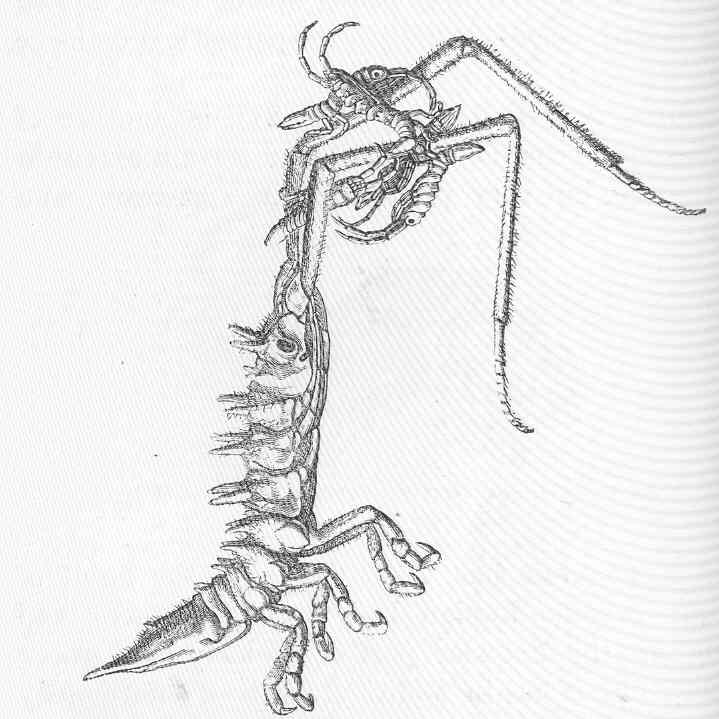
- Arcturus baffini (Sabine, 1824) in Wyville (1873) "Depths of the Sea"

Scientific classification
- Kingdom: Animalia
- Phylum: Arthropoda
- Clade: Pancrustacea
- Class: Malacostraca
- Order: Isopoda
- Family: Arcturidae
- Genus: Arcturus; Latreille, 1829

= Arcturus (crustacean) =

Genus of crustaceans

Arcturus is a genus of crustaceans belonging to the family Arcturidae.

Species of the genus include:

- Arcturus acuticaudalis Gurjanova, 1933
- Arcturus asper Kussakin, 1972
- Arcturus baffini (Sabine, 1824)
- Arcturus beringanus Benedict, 1898
- Arcturus caribbaeus Richardson, 1901
- Arcturus crassispinis Richardson, 1909
- Arcturus crenulatus Gurjanova, 1933
- Arcturus diversispinis Richardson, 1909
- Arcturus granulatus Richardson, 1909
- Arcturus hastatus Nunomura, 2006
- Arcturus hastiger Richardson, 1909
- Arcturus longispinis Benedict, 1898
- Arcturus macrurus Kussakin, 1982
- Arcturus magnispinis Richardson, 1909
- Arcturus ochotensis Kussakin, 1982
- Arcturus parvus Richardson, 1910
- Arcturus pawneeanus Boone, 1927
- Arcturus primus Mezhov, 1980
- Arcturus scabrosus Norman, 1904
- Arcturus seminudus Gurjanova, 1933
- Arcturus setosus Gurjanova, 1933
- Arcturus subtilis Kussakin, 1971
- Arcturus tarasovi (Gurjanova, 1935)
- Arcturus ulbani Gurjanova, 1933
- Arcturus verrucosus Kussakin, 1982

Furthermore, as taxon inquirendum in some schemes:

- Arcturus brevicornis Haswell, 1882

Or of doubtful inclusion:

- Arcturus kilepoae Kussakin, 1971 [Synonym?]
