= James Eights =

American physician, scientist and artist

James Eights (1798–1882) was an American medical doctor, scientist, and artist. He was born in Albany, New York, the son of medical doctor Jonathan Eights and Alida Wynkoop. James also became a medical doctor and was appointed an examiner at a local engineering school which is now known as Rensselaer Polytechnic Institute.

Eights became an assistant to Amos Eaton and helped complete the surveys along the Erie Canal.

Upon the recommendation of Amos Eaton, who called Eights "one of the most competent geologists in North America", Eights obtained the position of naturalist on the first voyage of discovery made outside the United States. He was a member of the "South Sea Fur Company and Exploring Expedition" of 1829. This was a private enterprise organized by Jeremiah N. Reynolds. The expedition included two brigs, Annawan and Seraph, commanded by Benjamin Pendleton and Nathaniel B. Palmer respectively, plus the schooner Penguin commanded by Alexander Palmer. Eights made observations of the flora and fauna in the lands reached by the expedition, which included Patagonia and Staten Island. He was the first to describe a trilobite fossil found on the South Shetland Islands in the Antarctic, a pycnogonid, and the presence of glacial erratics.

Upon his return, James Eights published some of his materials in journals, but failed to obtain any further positions on exploratory voyages. He held himself out to be a geologist, mineralogist, and surveyor, obtaining some work away from Albany. Later he produced the watercolors and sketches of the Albany of his youth, by which he is now better known. He is believed to have never practiced medicine after the Antarctic expedition. Eights never married and lived his last years in the home of a sister.

Eights died in Ballston, New York. The Eights Coast of Antarctica and the short lived Eights Station exploration base were named in his honor.
