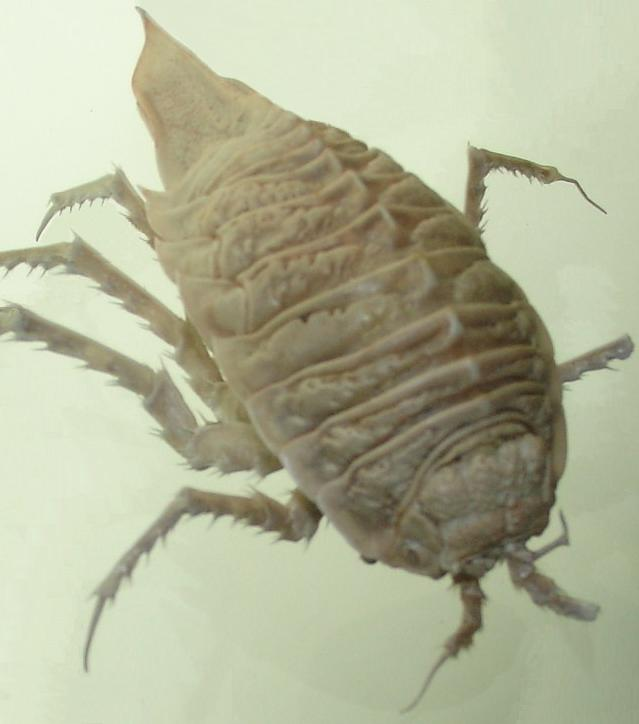
- Glyptonotus antarcticus

Scientific classification
- Kingdom: Animalia
- Phylum: Arthropoda
- Class: Malacostraca
- Order: Isopoda
- Suborder: Valvifera
- Family: Chaetiliidae; Dana, 1849

Genera
- See text

= Chaetiliidae =

Family of crustaceans

The Chaetiliidae are a family of isopod crustaceans in the suborder Valvifera, comprising these genera:

- Austrochaetilia Poore, 1978
- Chaetilia Dana, 1849
- Chiridotea Harger, 1878
- Chiriscus Richardson, 1911
- Glyptonotus Eights, 1852
- Macrochiridothea Ohlin, 1901
- Maoridotea Jones & Fenwick, 1978
- Parachiridotea Daguerre de Hureaux & Elkaïm, 1972
- † Proidotea Racovitza & Sevastos, 1910
- Saduria Adams, 1852
- Saduriella Holthuis, 1964
- Stegidotea Poore, 1985
- Symmius Richardson, 1904
